= Mule (disambiguation) =

A mule is the offspring of a female horse and a male donkey.

Mule, MULE or The Mule can also refer to:

== Animals ==
- Mule (sheep), in British sheep farming, a cross between a meat ram and a hardy mountain ewe
- Mule deer (Odocoileus hemionus), a North American species of deer (not a hybrid) with large mule-like ears
- Mules, hybrid British finches, such as of a goldfinch and a canary

== Arts, entertainment, and media ==
=== Fictional entities ===
- The Mule (Foundation), a character in Isaac Asimov's Foundation series

=== Films ===
- Francis (The Talking Mule) a 1950 film, launching a series of seven films featuring the character.
- The Mule, also known as Border Run, a 2012 film starring Sharon Stone
- The Mule (2014 film), a 2014 Australian film starring Hugo Weaving, Angus Sampson, and John Noble
- The Mule (2018 film), a 2018 American film starring and directed by Clint Eastwood

=== Music ===
- Mule (album), a 1990 album by Alice Donut
- Mule (band), an American punk blues band fronted by P. Long
- "Mule", a song by Agoraphobic Nosebleed from the 7" single Agoraphobic Nosebleed
- "Mule", a song by Gov't Mule from the album Gov't Mule
- "The Mule" (song), a song by Deep Purple from the album Fireball
- "The Mule", a song by The Magic Numbers from the album The Magic Numbers

=== Other uses in arts, entertainment, and media ===
- Mule (newspaper), a non-profit, Manchester-based independent media project
- M.U.L.E., a 1983 multiplayer video game
- The Mule (dance), a 1960s dance fad
- "The Mule" (novella), a 1945 novella by Isaac Asimov, republished as the second half of the 1952 novel Foundation and Empire

== People ==
- Mule (nickname), a list of people
- Mule (surname), a list of people with the last name Mule or Mules

== Places ==
- Mule, Norway, a village in Levanger municipality in Trøndelag county, Norway
- Mule Island, Princess Elizabeth Land, Antarctica
- Mule Keys, a group of scattered islets in the Florida Keys
  - Mule Key, easternmost of the islets
- Mule Lake, a lake in Minnesota
- Mule Mountains (California), Riverside County, California
- Mule Mountains, Cochise County, Arizona
- Mule Peninsula, Princess Elizabeth Land, Antarctica
- Mule Point, Kemp Land, Antarctica
- Mule Town, Ohio, an unincorporated community
- The Mule (river), a river in Wales

== Software ==
- Mule (software), an open source Java-based Enterprise Service Bus
- MULE, the MUltiLingual Extension to Emacs allowing editing text written in multiple languages

== Transport ==
- Mule, the NATO reporting name of the Polikarpov Po-2 Soviet biplane
- Mule, a type of locomotive
- Mule, a light utility vehicle produced by Kawasaki and by extension any similar vehicle
- Mule, the U.S. Military M274 Truck, Platform, Utility 1/2 Ton, 4X4, a 4-wheel drive military vehicle
- Mules (Amtrak), two passenger trains which ran between St. Louis and Kansas City, Missouri
- Development mule (typically simply "mule"), a vehicle equipped with experimental or prototype components for testing
- Maultier ("Mule"), a series of German World War II half-tracks
- Multifunctional utility/logistics and equipment vehicle (MULE), an unmanned six-wheeled vehicle

== Other uses ==
- Mule (cocktail), a cocktail made of a spirit, ginger beer and lime juice
- Mule (coin), a coin or medal minted with obverse and reverse designs not normally seen on the same piece
- Mule (shoe), a type of shoe or slipper without a back
- Mule (smuggling), a smuggler of contraband
  - Money mule, a transferrer of laundered money
- Spinning mule or Crompton's mule, a textile spinning technology created by Samuel Crompton in 1779

== See also ==
- eMule, a peer-to-peer file sharing application for Microsoft Windows
- Mul (disambiguation)
- Muel (disambiguation)
- Mules (disambiguation)
- Mulesing, a controversial Australian procedure which aims to reduce fly-strike in sheep by removing folds of skin around the tail
- Mulé
