= Bird hybrid =

Bird with two different species as parents

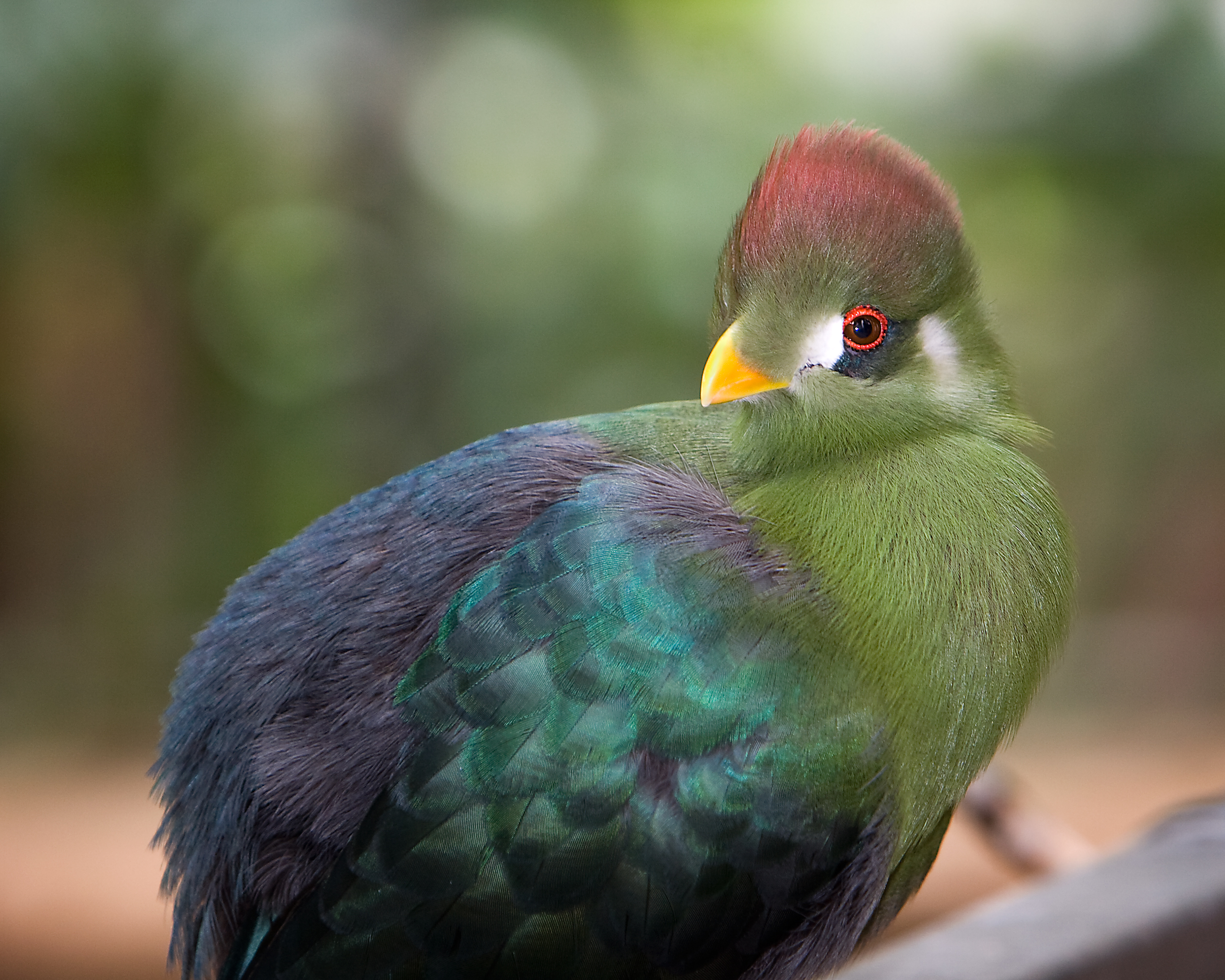
Hybrid turaco

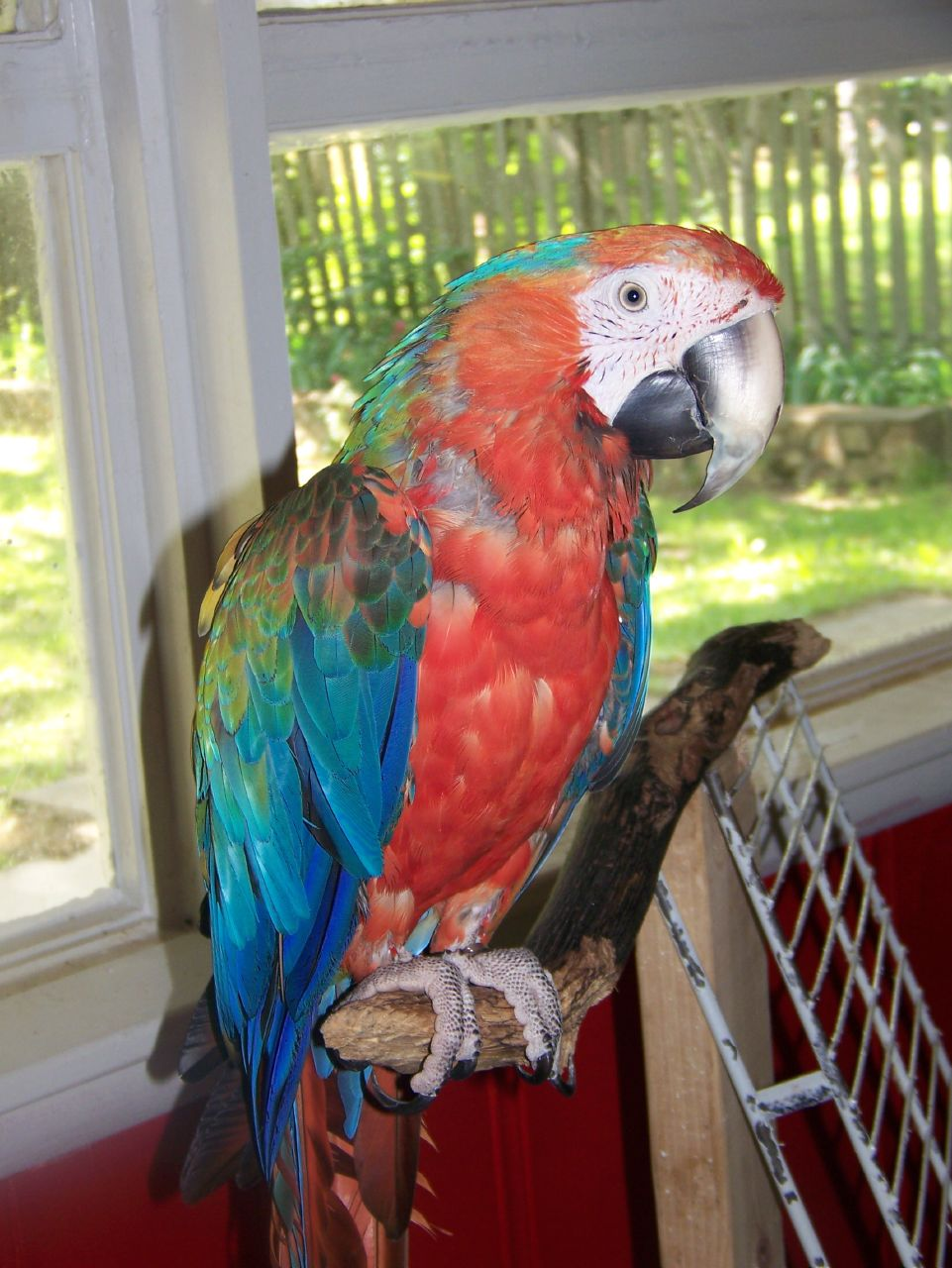
A Catalina macaw - a blue-and-yellow macaw × scarlet macaw hybrid

A bird hybrid is a bird that has two different species as parents. The resulting bird can present with any combination of characteristics from the parent species, from totally identical to completely different. Usually, the bird hybrid shows intermediate characteristics between the two species. A "successful" hybrid is one demonstrated to produce fertile offspring. According to the most recent estimates, about 16% of all wild bird species have been known to hybridize with one another; this number increases to 22% when captive hybrids are taken into account. Several bird species hybridize with multiple other species. For example, the mallard (Anas platyrhynchos) is known to interbreed with at least 40 different species. The ecological and evolutionary consequences of multispecies hybridization remain to be determined.

In the wild, some of the most frequently reported hybrids are waterfowl, gulls, hummingbirds, and birds-of-paradise. Mallards, whether of wild or domestic origin, hybridize with other ducks so often that multiple duck species are at risk of extinction because of it. In gulls, Western × Glaucous-winged Gulls (known as "Olympic Gulls") are particularly common; these hybrids are fertile and may be more evolutionarily fit than either parent species. At least twenty different hummingbird hybrid combinations have been reported, and intergeneric hybrids are not uncommon within the family. At least two hybrids (Eudyptes chrysolophus × E. chrysocome; Spheniscus humboldti × S. magellanicus) are known in penguins.

New World warblers are known to hybridize as well, and an unusual three-species warbler hybrid was discovered in May 2018. Hybridisation in shorebirds is unusual but reliably recorded.

Numerous gamebird, domestic fowl and duck hybrids are known. Captive songbird hybrids are sometimes called mules. Numerous hybrid macaws exist in aviculture and occasionally occur in the wild. Some of these hybrid parrots are fertile with both the parent species and other hybrids.

The scientific literature on hybridization in birds has been collected at the Avian Hybrids Project.

The reality of bird hybrids also calls into question modern definitions of the word "species". Throughout literature, there tends to be a general vagueness regarding the word "species" and how it should be defined. Birds serve as an excellent example of this fluidity due to the remarkable cross-breeding opportunities.

== Examples of hybrid birds ==
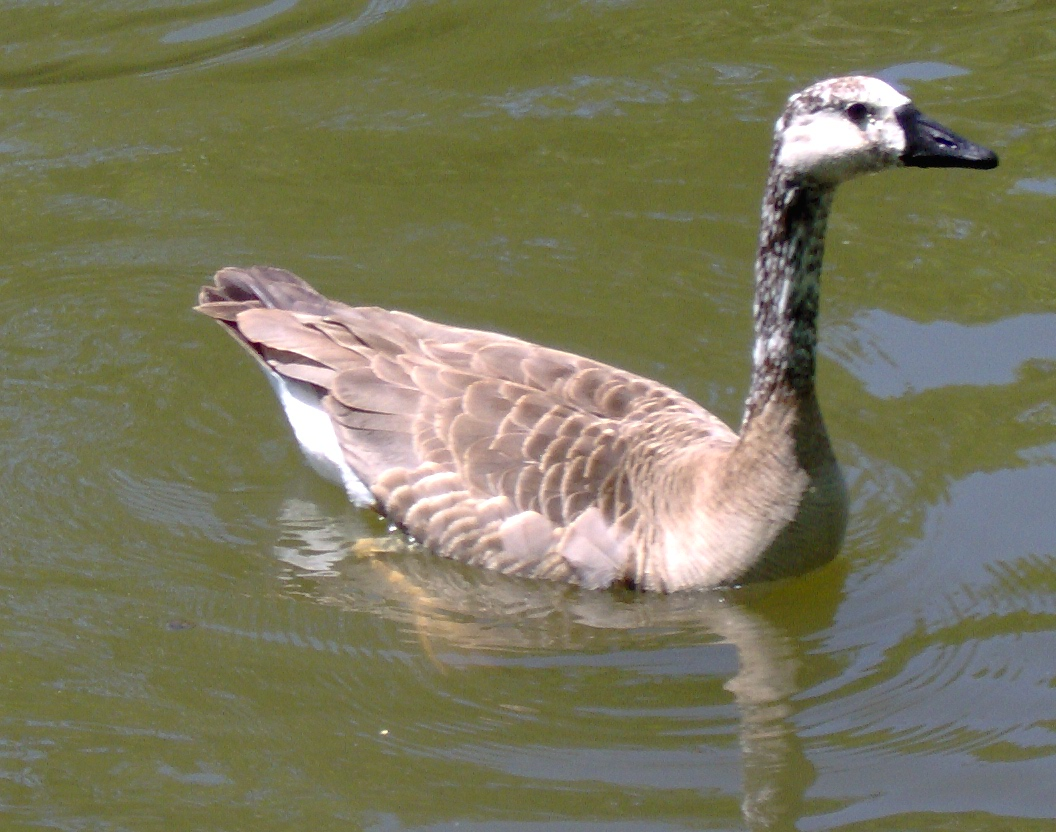
An intergeneric hybrid between Canada goose (Branta canadensis) and domestic goose (Anser anser domesticus)

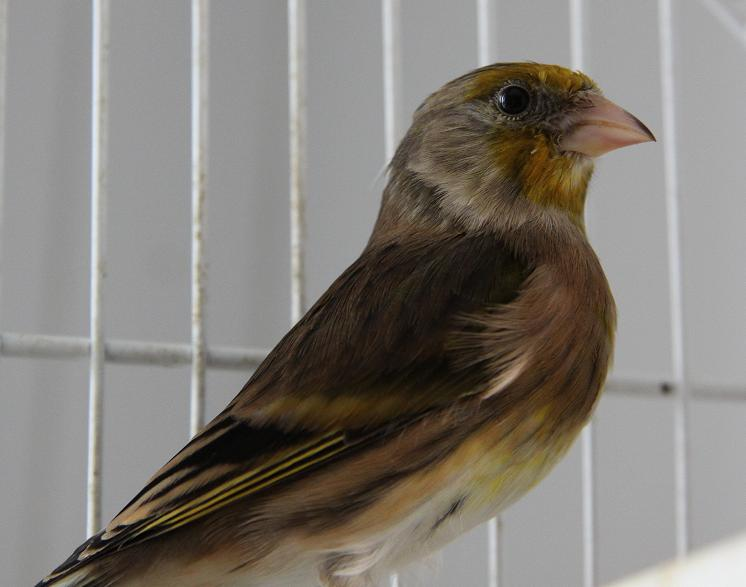
A mule, a hybrid between domestic canary and goldfinch

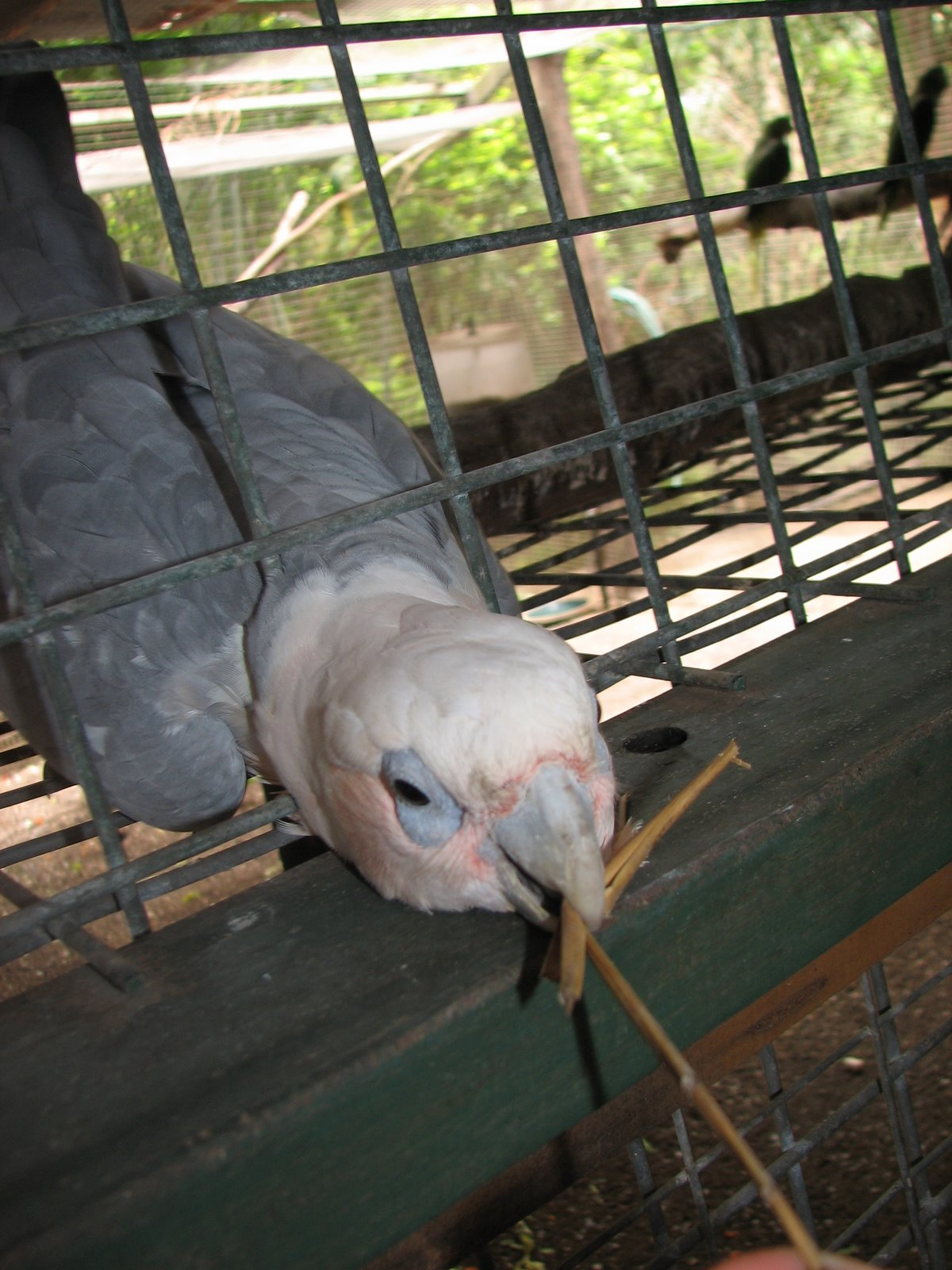
A probable galah × little corella intergeneric hybrid

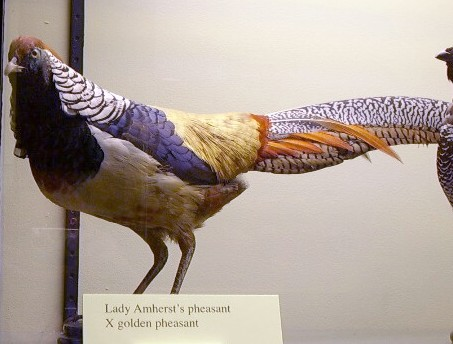
Lady Amherst's pheasant × golden pheasant

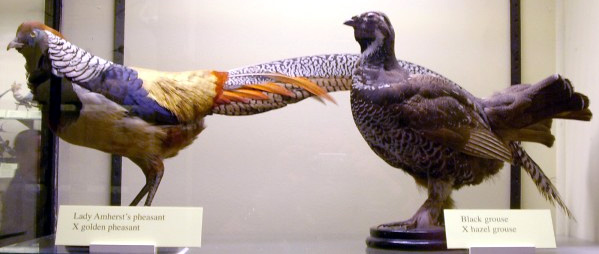
Hybrid pheasant (left) and hybrid of black grouse × hazel grouse (right)

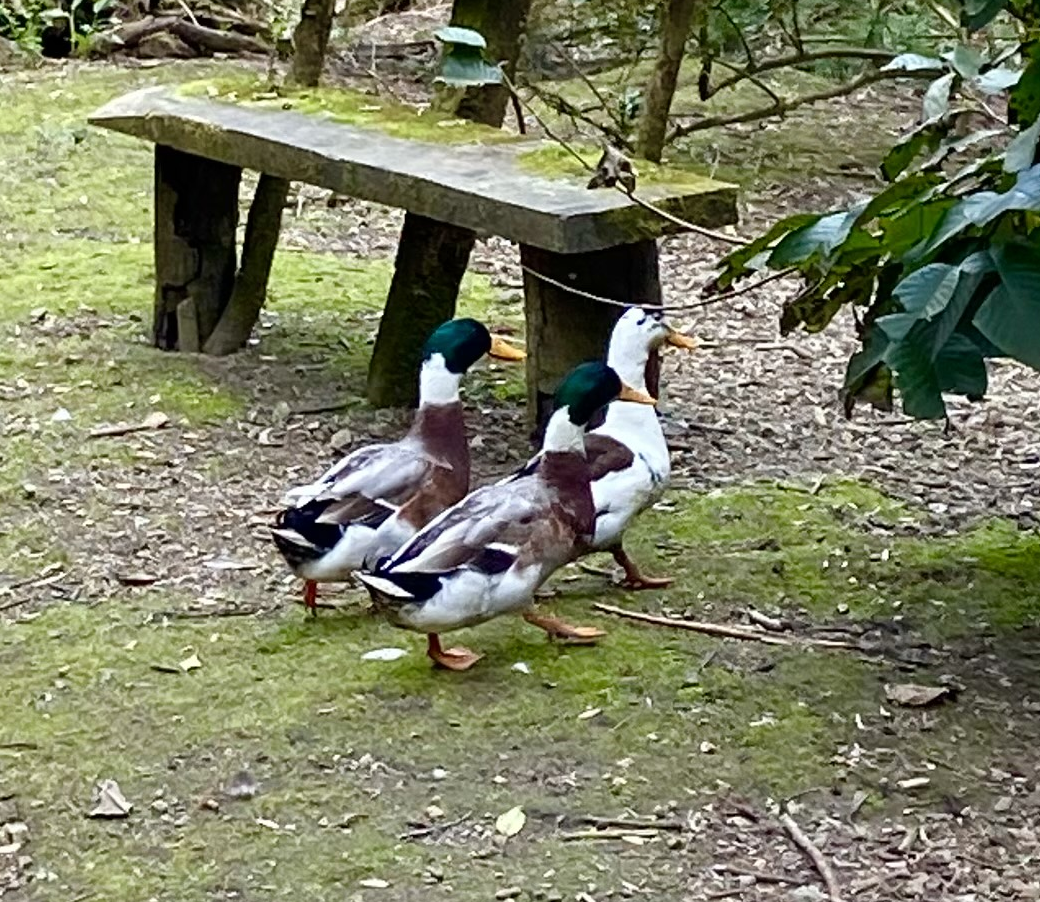
Mulards, hybrids between a domestic Muscovy duck and a wild-type mallard

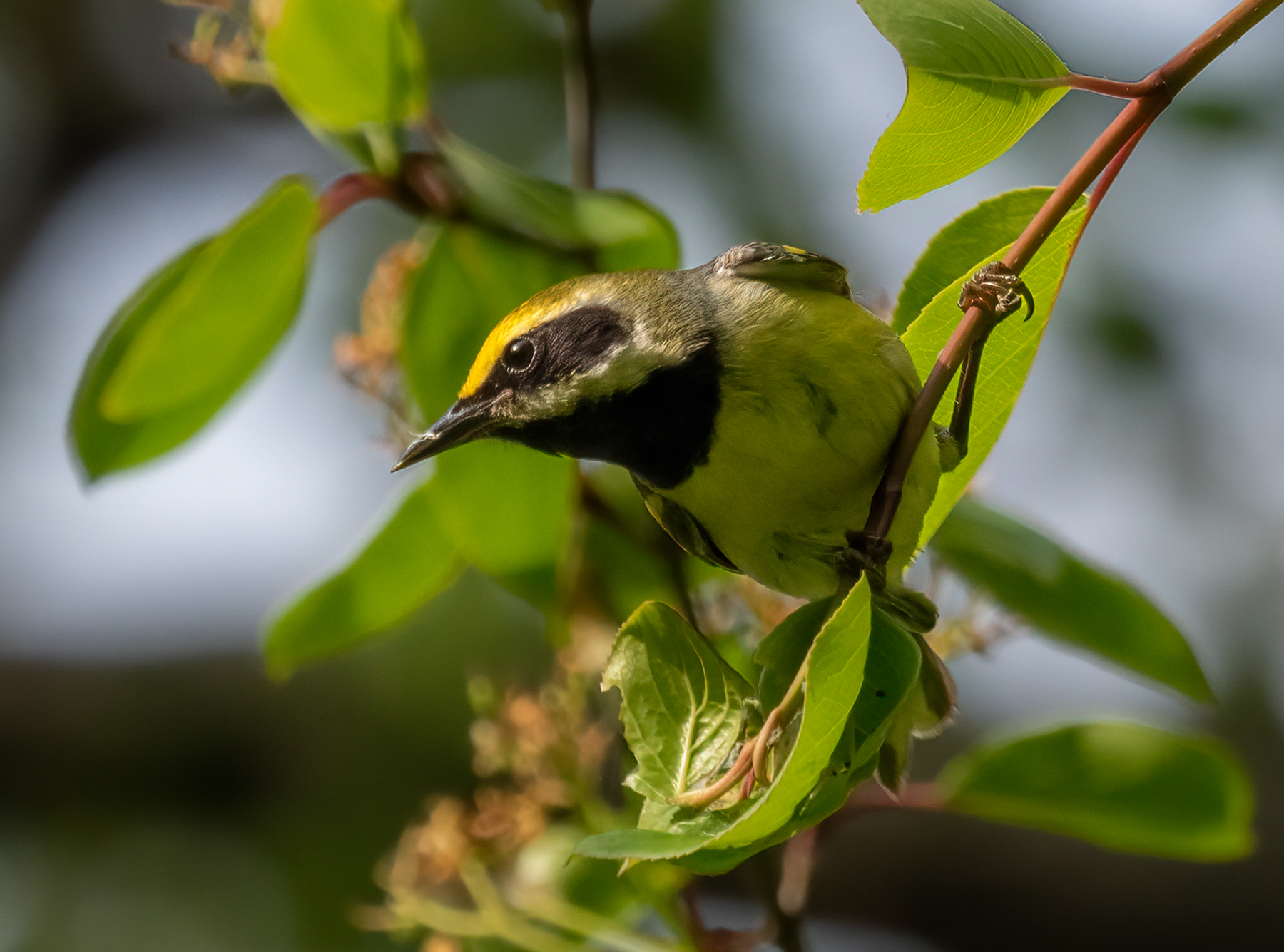
Lawrence's warbler, a hybrid between golden-winged warbler and blue-winged warbler

== See also ==
- Haldane's rule
- Polyploidy
- Punctuated equilibrium
- Speciation
- Species concepts
- Species problem
- Hybridisation in gulls
- Hybridisation in terns
- Hybridisation in shorebirds
- Gamebird hybrids
