= Zolotov =

Zolotov (feminine: Zolotova) (Cyrillic: Золотов) is a Slavic surname based on the word gold (Золото). Notable people with the surname include:

- Andrej Andreevich Zolotov (born 1937), Russian screenwriter and art and music critic who authored 30 documentaries
- Irina Zolotova (1947–2025), Armenian musicologist and composer
- Marina Zolotova (born 1977), Belarusian journalist
- Nahum Zolotov (1926–2014), Israeli architect
- Roman Zolotov (born 1974), Russian ice hockey player
- Viktor Zolotov (born 1954), the head of Russian President Vladimir Putin's personal security service

== See also ==
- 8142 Zolotov, a main-belt asteroid
- Zolotov Island, Antarctica
