= Hybridisation in gulls =

Cross-species reproduction in birds

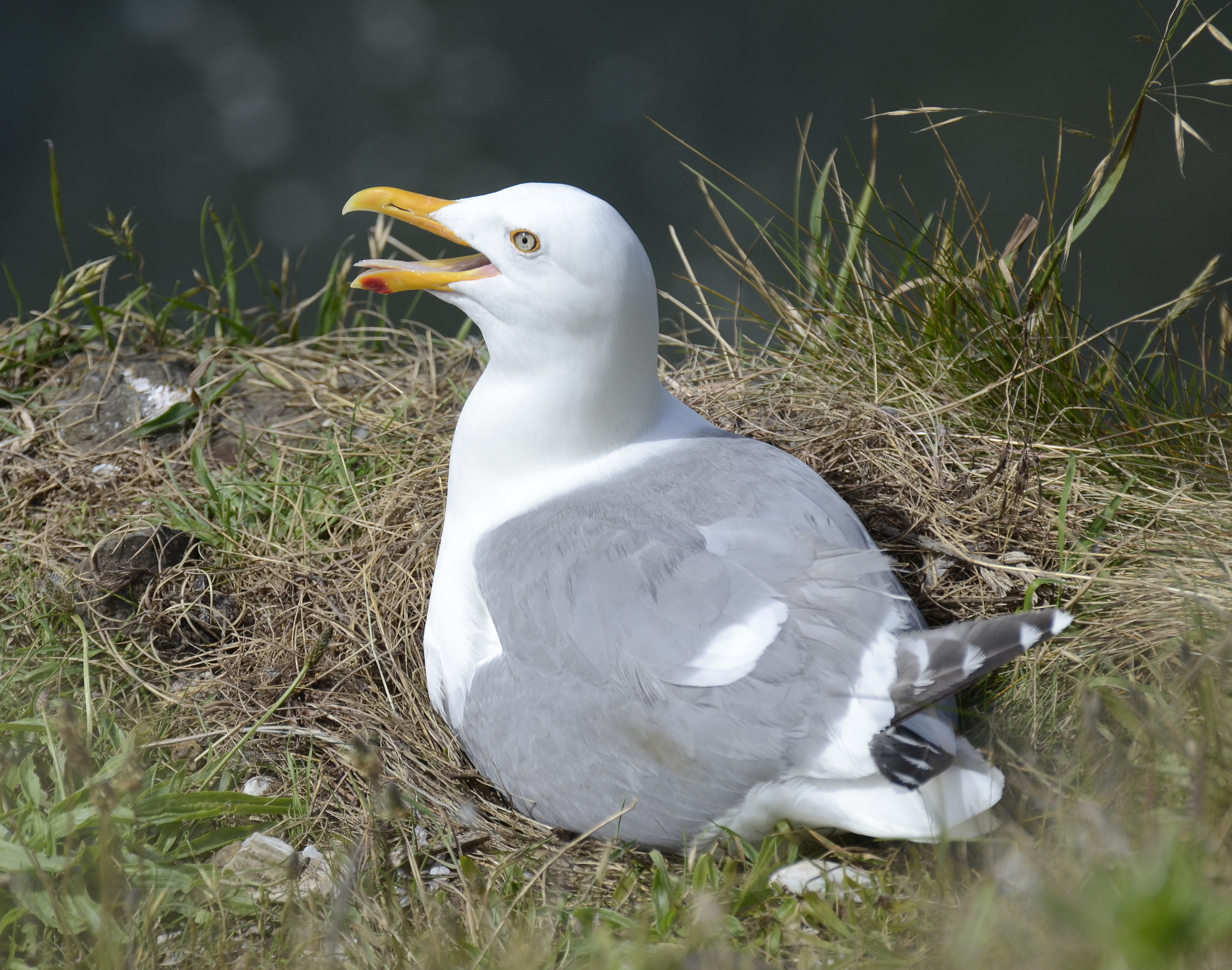
Nesting Western x Glaucous-winged gull hybrid, colloquially known as the "Olympic Gull".

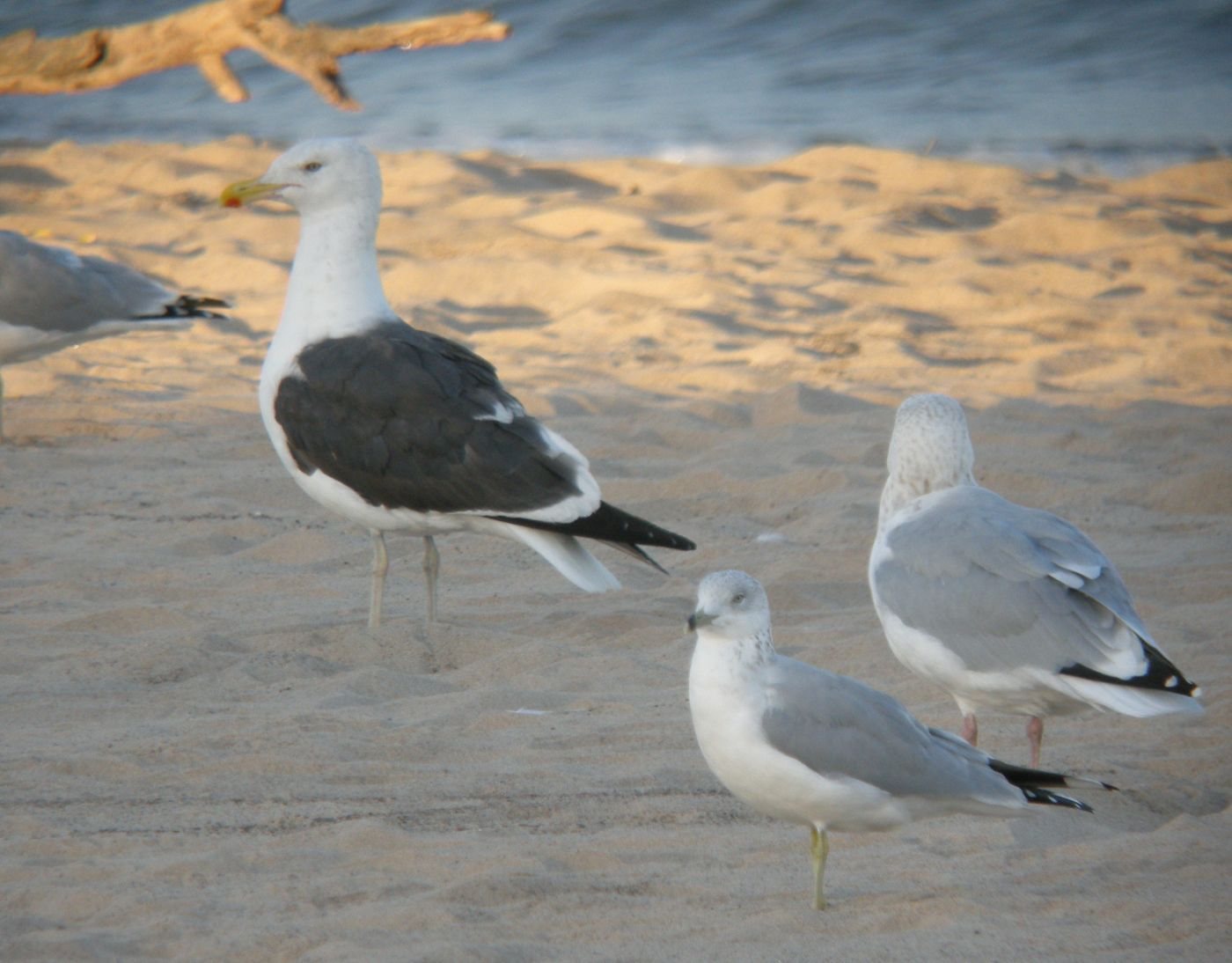
Kelp × American herring gull hybrid, or "Chandeleur gull" (left)

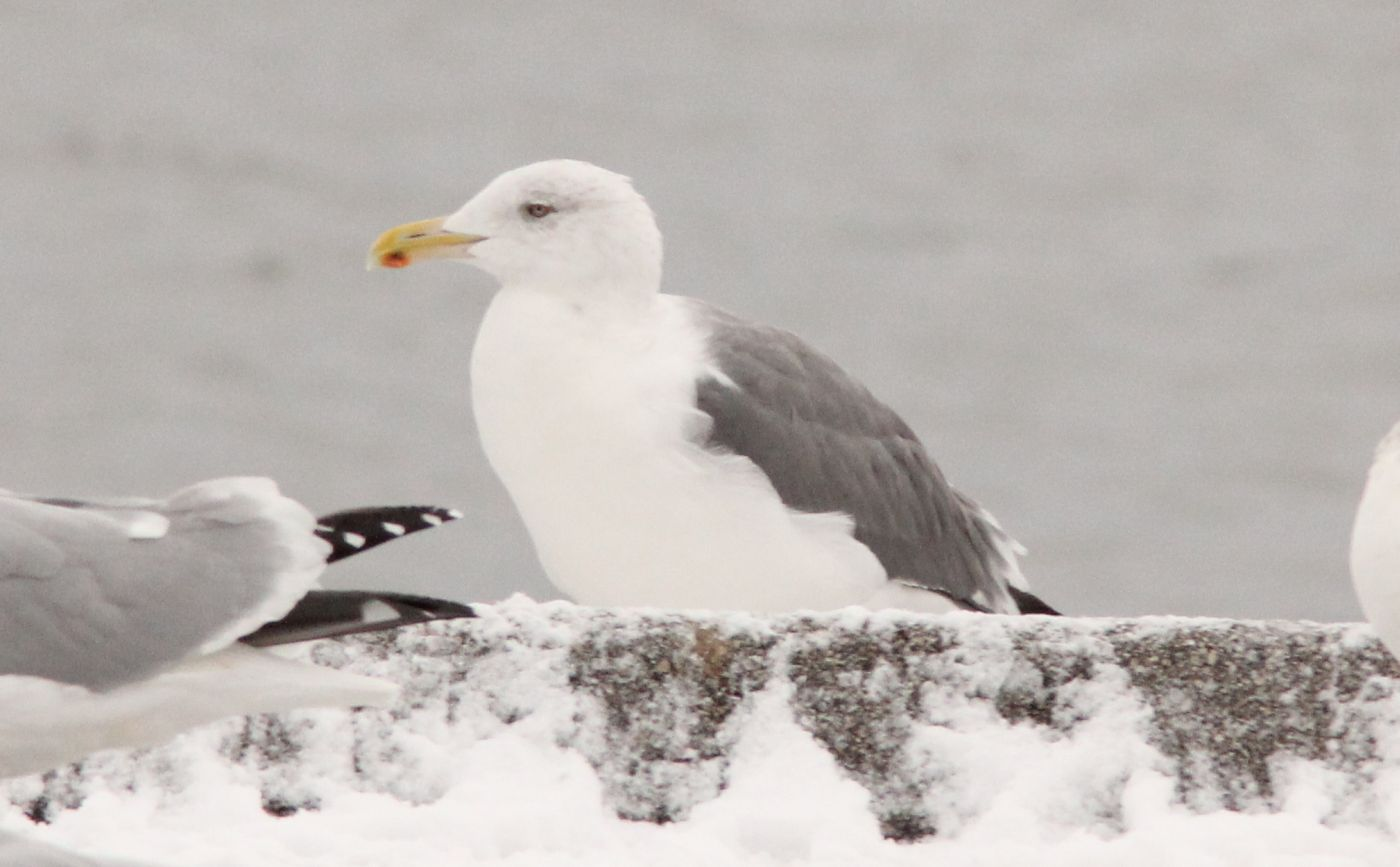
Great black-backed × American herring gull hybrid

Hybridisation in gulls occurs quite frequently, although to varying degrees depending on the species involved.

== Hybrid large white-headed gulls ==
- European herring gulls and lesser black-backed gulls interbreed to a limited degree in their wide area of range overlap, producing birds of intermediate appearance, which can be confused with yellow-legged gull.
- Lesser black-backed gull has interbred with yellow-legged gull on a few occasions in England, Germany, and the Netherlands.
- European herring gulls and glaucous gulls hybridise in Iceland and Greenland. The offspring have been termed "Viking gull".
- Western gulls and glaucous-winged gulls hybridise extensively in western North America between Washington and Oregon. This particular hybrid is sometimes known as the "Olympic gull", or "Puget Sound gull". The persistence and backcrossing of hybrids is believed to be due to hybrid superiority, where hybrids exhibit higher evolutionary fitness than parent species in the hybrid zone.
- Great black-backed gulls and American herring gulls share an extensive amount of mtDNA, likely resulting from both ancestral and modern hybridisation.
- American herring gulls and glaucous gulls hybridise in Alaska. The offspring have been termed "Nelson's gull".
- American herring gulls and glaucous-winged gulls hybridise extensively in southern Alaska. The offspring are sometimes termed "Cook Inlet gull".
- Glaucous-winged gulls and glaucous gulls hybridise in western Alaska. These hybrids are sometimes called "Seward gull".
- American herring gulls and kelp gulls have hybridised in Louisiana's Chandeleur Islands. This combination has been termed "Chandeleur gull". This hybrid is interesting as Louisiana is outside of the normal breeding range of both parent species.
- Glaucous-winged Gull and Slaty-backed Gull hybridise in western Alaska and possibly eastern Siberia. A name for this combination has been emerging as "Commander" Gull, after the Commander Islands off of eastern Russia. Some speculate most Glaucous-winged Gulls wintering in Asia have hybrid origins.
- A hybrid between lesser black-backed gull and ring-billed gull has been seen over a period of several years from 2012 to 2025 in the English Midlands; a similar bird has also been seen in Spain during the same period.

== Hybrids among the smaller gulls ==
- The most common hybrid found among smaller gulls in Europe is between black-headed gull (Chroicocephalus ridibundus) and Mediterranean gull (Ichthyaetus melanocephalus). Hybrids of this combination are occasionally reported on the northwestern edge of the breeding range of Mediterranean gull.
- Hybrid Mediterranean gull × common gull (Larus canus) has also been recorded more rarely; one such gull was seen in Lincolnshire in 2002.
- A bird seen in December 2001 at Belhaven Bay, Lothian, and present each winter since (until at least 2005/6) is believed to be a hybrid between black-headed and common gulls.
- Laughing gull (Leucophaeus atricilla) has rarely produced hybrids with black-headed gull, ring-billed gull (Larus delawarensis), and gray-hooded gull (Chroicocephalus cirrocephalus).
- Common gull is known to have hybridised with ring-billed gull in Northern Ireland.

== See also ==
- Bird hybrid
- Hybridisation in shorebirds
- Hybridisation in terns
- Gamebird hybrids
