= Zolotov Island =

Island of Antarctica

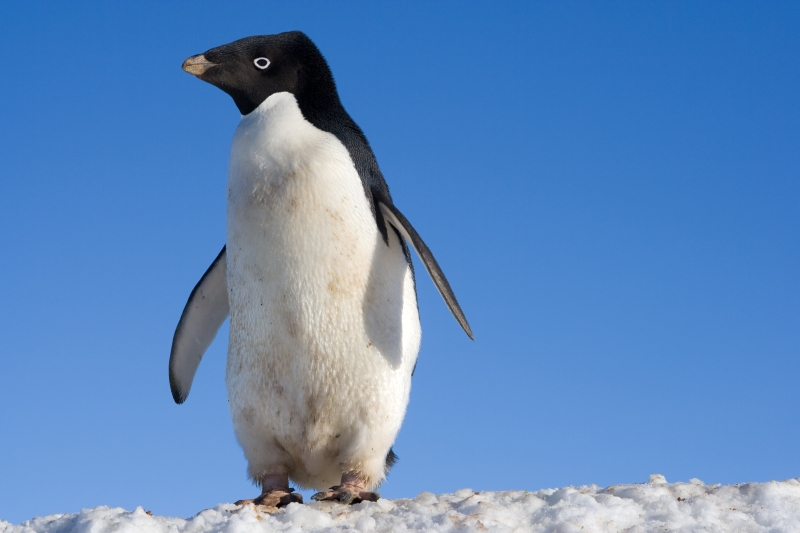
- Adélie penguins breed in the IBA

- Location within Antarctica

Geography
- Location: Princess Elizabeth Land, Antarctica
- Coordinates: 68°39′32″S 77°52′07″E
- Length: 1.4 km (0.87 mi)
- Width: 1.2 km (0.75 mi)
- Highest elevation: 46 m (151 ft)

Administration
- Administered under the Antarctic Treaty System

Demographics
- Population: Uninhabited

Zolotov Island lies 1 km south of Hawker Island and 0.5 km west of the Mule Peninsula, in Prydz Bay on the Ingrid Christensen Coast of Princess Elizabeth Land, Antarctica. The nearest permanent research station is Australia's Davis, some 10 km to the north-east on Broad Peninsula, Vestfold Hills. Several small lakes are present on the island.

== Discovery and naming ==
The island was mapped from aerial photographs taken by the Lars Christensen Expedition (1936–37) and also photographed by the USN’s Operation Highjump (1946–47), the Soviet Antarctic Expedition of 1956, and by ANARE in 1957 and 1958. It was named Ostrov Zolotova by the Soviet Expedition after A.H. Zolotov, a hydrologist who died in Antarctica.

== Important Bird Area ==
A 167 ha site, which comprises all of Zolotov Island, neighbouring Kazak Island and the intervening marine area, has been designated an Important Bird Area (IBA) by BirdLife International because it supports about 23,000 breeding pairs of Adélie penguins, based on estimates made in 1981/82.
