= List of lakes of Monroe County, Arkansas =

There are at least 101 named lakes and reservoirs in Monroe County, Arkansas.

== Lakes ==
- Barnes Lake, 34°52′46″N 091°21′03″W, el. 164 feet (50 m)
- Bear Slough, 34°38′33″N 091°17′56″W, el. 157 feet (48 m)
- Beaver Dam Lake, 34°28′42″N 091°11′30″W, el. 151 feet (46 m)
- Bellknap Lake, 34°22′43″N 091°06′34″W, el. 151 feet (46 m)
- Big Baptize Lake, 34°38′47″N 091°17′00″W, el. 157 feet (48 m)
- Big Cotton Lake, 34°59′25″N 091°12′23″W, el. 174 feet (53 m)
- Big Eagle Lake, 34°32′53″N 091°16′43″W, el. 157 feet (48 m)
- Big Weidmann Lake, 34°42′44″N 091°20′06″W, el. 154 feet (47 m)
- Blue Hole, 34°57′16″N 091°12′34″W, el. 174 feet (53 m)
- Boggy Lake, 34°32′11″N 091°16′48″W, el. 161 feet (49 m)
- Browns Shanty Lake, 34°27′01″N 091°10′07″W, el. 151 feet (46 m)
- Brushy Lake, 34°40′08″N 091°17′48″W, el. 157 feet (48 m)
- Brushy Lake, 34°26′00″N 091°07′35″W, el. 144 feet (44 m)
- Brushy Lake, 34°30′47″N 091°15′00″W, el. 151 feet (46 m)
- Buck Lake, 34°23′46″N 091°07′08″W, el. 148 feet (45 m)
- Bull Lake, 34°53′49″N 091°21′40″W, el. 171 feet (52 m)
- Burnt Cypress Lake, 34°31′46″N 091°15′12″W, el. 154 feet (47 m)
- Clear Lake, 34°36′59″N 091°19′02″W, el. 161 feet (49 m)
- Cloud Lake, 34°34′02″N 091°18′14″W, el. 154 feet (47 m)
- Cooter Lake, 34°31′04″N 091°12′16″W, el. 154 feet (47 m)
- Crab Lake, 34°29′25″N 091°11′14″W, el. 148 feet (45 m)
- Crosspond Bayou, 34°51′19″N 091°20′01″W, el. 164 feet (50 m)
- Crowfoot Lake, 34°23′50″N 091°06′46″W, el. 151 feet (46 m)
- Dodson Lake, 34°56′43″N 091°13′38″W, el. 171 feet (52 m)
- Eagle Nest Lake, 34°34′03″N 091°16′45″W, el. 154 feet (47 m)
- Eagle Nest Lake, 34°22′42″N 091°05′03″W, el. 148 feet (45 m)
- East Lake, 34°36′04″N 091°17′07″W, el. 154 feet (47 m)
- First Old River, 34°40′41″N 091°19′33″W, el. 151 feet (46 m)
- Fish Lake, 34°46′50″N 091°19′07″W, el. 164 feet (50 m)
- Forked Lake, 34°34′43″N 091°16′30″W, el. 154 feet (47 m)
- Goose Lake, 34°27′21″N 091°11′17″W, el. 154 feet (47 m)
- Goose Lake, 34°46′38″N 091°21′53″W, el. 164 feet (50 m)
- Goose Lake, 34°24′49″N 091°06′54″W, el. 151 feet (46 m)
- Goose Lake, 34°36′40″N 091°16′45″W, el. 161 feet (49 m)
- Goose Pond, 34°35′36″N 091°16′55″W, el. 157 feet (48 m)
- Graveyard Lake, 34°37′10″N 091°20′52″W, el. 161 feet (49 m)
- Green Lake, 34°34′03″N 091°15′24″W, el. 154 feet (47 m)
- Hart Lake, 34°40′22″N 091°22′02″W, el. 161 feet (49 m)
- Heifer Lake, 34°54′20″N 091°20′44″W, el. 171 feet (52 m)
- Hickson Lake, 34°53′20″N 091°17′49″W, el. 167 feet (51 m)
- Hog Thief Lake, 34°24′45″N 091°06′15″W, el. 144 feet (44 m)
- Hole in the Wall, 34°43′26″N 091°19′13″W, el. 154 feet (47 m)
- Horseshoe Lake, 34°37′09″N 091°17′17″W, el. 154 feet (47 m)
- Horseshoe Lake, 34°28′06″N 091°12′18″W, el. 157 feet (48 m)
- Horseshoe Lake, 34°46′36″N 091°19′52″W, el. 164 feet (50 m)
- Ingram Lake, 34°45′58″N 091°18′15″W, el. 161 feet (49 m)
- Kansas Lake, 34°28′16″N 091°09′13″W, el. 148 feet (45 m)
- Lambert Bayou, 34°25′43″N 091°08′18″W, el. 151 feet (46 m)
- Little Baptize Lake, 34°38′35″N 091°16′53″W, el. 161 feet (49 m)
- Little Cotton Lake, 34°59′31″N 091°12′15″W, el. 174 feet (53 m)
- Little Eagle Lake, 34°33′14″N 091°16′50″W, el. 161 feet (49 m)
- Little Long Lake, 34°22′14″N 091°04′58″W, el. 144 feet (44 m)
- Little Moon Lake, 34°23′35″N 091°07′22″W, el. 144 feet (44 m)
- Little Weidmann Lake, 34°42′28″N 091°19′58″W, el. 161 feet (49 m)
- Long Lake, 34°24′34″N 091°08′47″W, el. 151 feet (46 m)
- Long Lake, 34°45′12″N 091°19′09″W, el. 157 feet (48 m)
- Long Lake, 34°54′47″N 091°20′22″W, el. 171 feet (52 m)
- Lost Lake, 34°48′37″N 091°20′09″W, el. 164 feet (50 m)
- Lower Crooked Lake, 34°32′49″N 091°15′19″W, el. 144 feet (44 m)
- Lower Eagle Nest Lake, 34°28′32″N 091°10′06″W, el. 151 feet (46 m)
- Lower Forked Lake, 34°28′04″N 091°11′30″W, el. 154 feet (47 m)
- Middle Crooked Lake, 34°33′19″N 091°15′39″W, el. 144 feet (44 m)
- Middle Old River, 34°42′50″N 091°20′43″W, el. 151 feet (46 m)
- Mill Lake, 34°58′23″N 091°12′03″W, el. 177 feet (54 m)
- Moon Lake, 34°21′53″N 091°05′08″W, el. 141 feet (43 m)
- Mud Lake, 34°36′53″N 091°18′43″W, el. 161 feet (49 m)
- Mud Lake, 34°33′37″N 091°14′57″W, el. 148 feet (45 m)
- Mule Lake, 34°33′44″N 091°15′49″W, el. 154 feet (47 m)
- Otter Lake, 34°44′49″N 091°21′07″W, el. 164 feet (50 m)
- Passmore Lake, 34°39′53″N 091°19′53″W, el. 151 feet (46 m)
- Pryor Lake, 34°30′52″N 091°12′12″W, el. 144 feet (44 m)
- Rainbow Lake, 34°46′05″N 091°21′10″W, el. 164 feet (50 m)
- Red Cat Lake, 34°37′50″N 091°18′20″W, el. 154 feet (47 m)
- Round Lake, 34°33′52″N 091°17′05″W, el. 151 feet (46 m)
- Round Pond, 34°29′26″N 091°13′45″W, el. 151 feet (46 m)
- Round Pond, 34°42′08″N 091°19′15″W, el. 161 feet (49 m)
- Sandy Slough, 34°21′23″N 091°02′55″W, el. 148 feet (45 m)
- Section 16 Lake, 34°57′31″N 091°12′24″W, el. 174 feet (53 m)
- Simpson Lake, 34°24′47″N 091°08′40″W, el. 151 feet (46 m)
- Slaughters Lake, 34°42′53″N 091°23′00″W, el. 154 feet (47 m)
- Straight Lake, 34°46′08″N 091°21′57″W, el. 164 feet (50 m)
- Straight Lake, 34°53′13″N 091°21′14″W, el. 171 feet (52 m)
- Upper Crooked Lake, 34°33′12″N 091°16′28″W, el. 148 feet (45 m)
- Upper Eagle Nest Lake, 34°31′05″N 091°13′22″W, el. 154 feet (47 m)
- Upper Forked Lake, 34°29′53″N 091°11′56″W, el. 154 feet (47 m)
- Upper Hooked Lake, 34°27′07″N 091°09′20″W, el. 151 feet (46 m)
- Upper Old River, 34°43′31″N 091°21′36″W, el. 161 feet (49 m)
- Upper Swan Lake, 34°24′50″N 091°07′37″W, el. 148 feet (45 m)
- Waters Bayou, 34°22′29″N 091°04′22″W, el. 141 feet (43 m)
- White Oak Lake, 34°29′36″N 091°10′31″W, el. 154 feet (47 m)
- Willow Lake, 34°27′15″N 091°08′42″W, el. 144 feet (44 m)
- Wire Lake, 34°32′21″N 091°17′23″W, el. 157 feet (48 m)

== Reservoirs ==
- Brinkley Lake, 34°53′01″N 091°09′50″W, el. 187 feet (57 m)
- Caney Slash, 34°53′03″N 091°13′02″W, el. 190 feet (58 m)
- Carnes Lake, 34°34′04″N 091°21′10″W, el. 200 feet (61 m)
- Cruthis Lake, 34°36′54″N 091°21′36″W, el. 187 feet (57 m)
- Lake Greenlee, 34°52′29″N 091°10′00″W, el. 187 feet (57 m)
- Lake Greenlee Reservoir, 34°52′00″N 091°09′48″W, el. 184 feet (56 m)
- McCollum Lake, 34°37′44″N 091°25′37″W, el. 197 feet (60 m)
- Midway Lake, 34°37′41″N 091°21′07″W, el. 184 feet (56 m)
- Water Bayou Reservoir, 34°23′16″N 091°06′45″W, el. 148 feet (45 m)

== See also ==
- List of lakes in Arkansas
