= Mules (disambiguation) =

Mules are the hybrid animals born to a male donkey and female horse.

Mules may also refer to:

== Sports teams ==
- Mules, the sports teams of Leilehua High School, Wahiawa, Hawaii
- Mules, the sports teams of Muleshoe High School, Muleshoe, Texas
- Mules, the sports teams of Muhlenberg College, Allentown, Pennsylvania
- Central Missouri Mules and Jennies, the sports teams of the University of Central Missouri
- Colby Mules, the sports teams of Colby College, in Waterville, Maine
- New Britain Mules, a 1930s American Basketball League team
- Newark Bears (basketball), an American Basketball League team renamed the Newark Mules for the 1934 season; merged with the New Britain Jackaways to form the New Britain Mules in the second half of the season
- St. Louis Mules, a member of the American Soccer League in the 1972 season

== Other uses ==
- Mules (train), passenger trains operated by Amtrak running between St. Louis and Kansas City, Missouri as part of the Missouri Service train network
- Mules (surname)

== See also ==
- Mule (disambiguation)
- Mule (surname)
