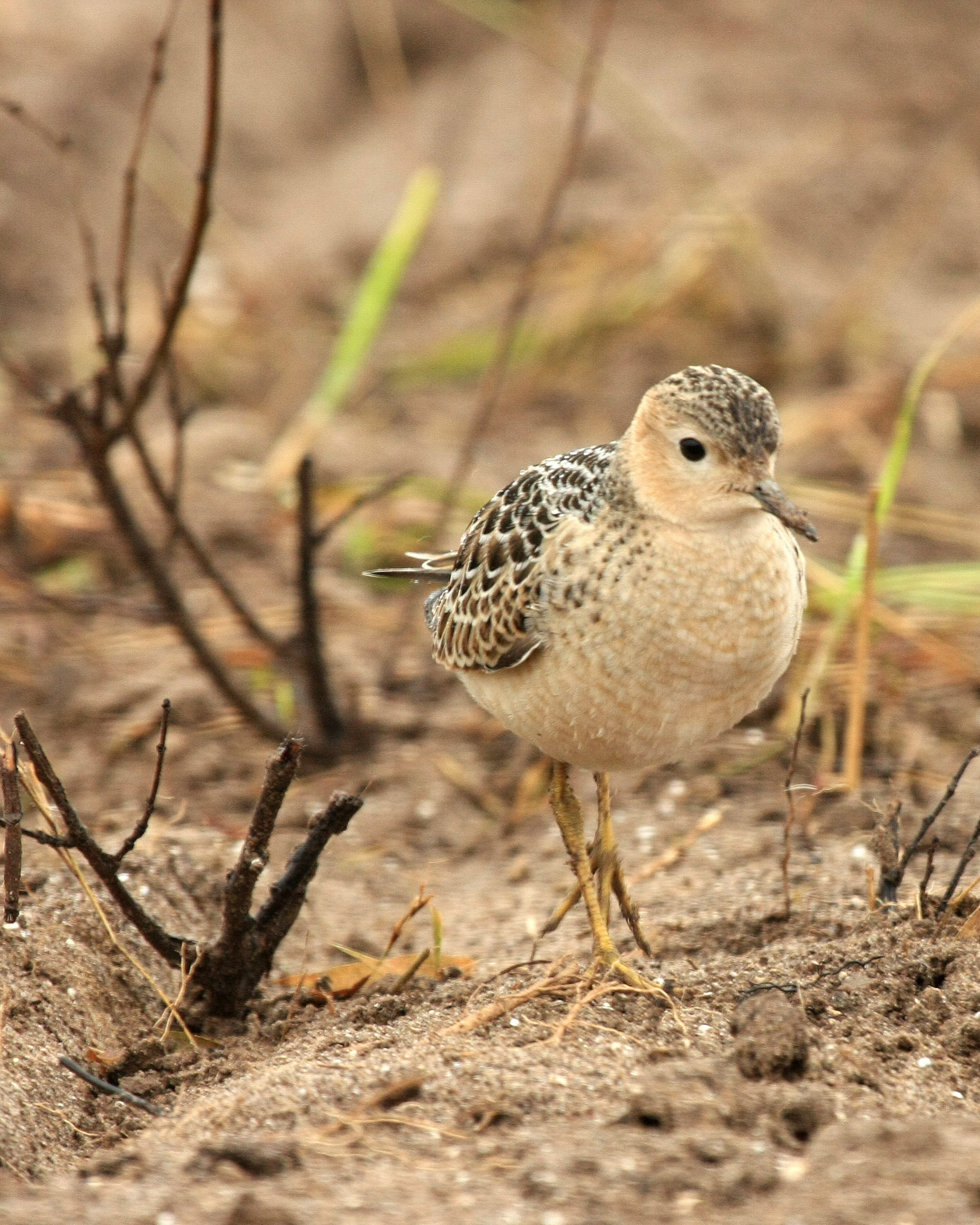

Conservation status
- Vulnerable (IUCN 3.1)

Scientific classification
- Kingdom: Animalia
- Phylum: Chordata
- Class: Aves
- Order: Charadriiformes
- Family: Scolopacidae
- Genus: Calidris
- Species: C. subruficollis

Binomial name
- Calidris subruficollis (Vieillot, 1819)
- Breeding Nonbreeding Passage

Synonyms
- Tryngites subruficollis

= Buff-breasted sandpiper =

Species of bird

The buff-breasted sandpiper (Calidris subruficollis) is a small shorebird. The species name subruficollis is from Latin subrufus, "reddish" (from sub, "somewhat", and rufus, "rufous") and collis, "-necked/-throated" (from collum, "neck"). It is a calidrid sandpiper, notable for its long annual migration, from the arctic region of North America to the pampas region of South America.

== Description ==
This species is brown above and has a buff face and underparts in all plumages. It has a short bill and yellow legs. Males are larger than females. Juveniles resemble the adults but may be paler on the rear underparts.

Standard Measurements
length	190–230 mm (7.5–8.9 in)
weight	63 g (2.2 oz)
wingspan	460 mm (18 in)
wing	128.2–138.7 mm (5.05–5.46 in)
tail	56.8–61.4 mm (2.24–2.42 in)
culmen	19.9–21.3 mm (0.78–0.84 in)
tarsus	31.8–34 mm (1.25–1.34 in)

== Distribution and habitat ==
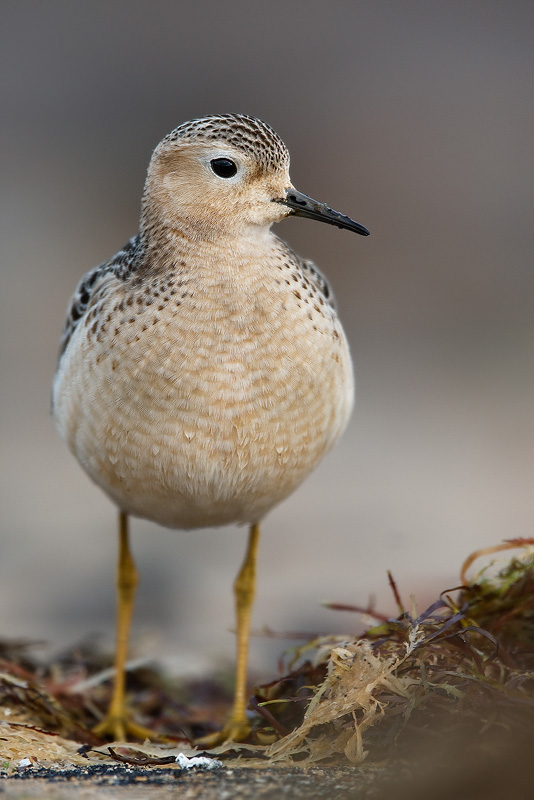

C. subruficollis breeds in the open arctic tundra of North America and is a very long-distance migrant, spending the non-breeding season mainly in South America, especially in Argentina and Uruguay.

It migrates mainly through central North America and is uncommon on the coasts. It occurs as a regular wanderer in Western Europe and is not classed as rare in Great Britain or Ireland, where small flocks have occurred. Only the pectoral sandpiper is a more common American shorebird visitor to Europe.

This species nests as far north as Canada including Alaska on the ground, laying four eggs. The male has a display which includes raising the wings to display the white undersides, which is also given on migration, sometimes when no other buff-breasted sandpipers are present. Outside the breeding season, this bird is normally found in short-grass habitats such as airfields or golf courses, rather than near water.

These birds pick up food by sight, mainly eating insects and other invertebrates. The buff-breasted sandpipers are known to prey on Bombus polaris, a species of bumblebee found within the Arctic Circle. They will either eat the bees or feed them to their young. They are often very tame.

Buff-breasted sandpipers are suspected to have hybridized with the white-rumped or Baird's sandpiper.

=== In South Asia and Australia ===
This species has been sighted in South Asia on at least three occasions. It is believed that instead of going to Argentina, this bird might have been wind-blown from the Great Plains Flyway of North America and landed up in South Asia. In November 2011, this species was sighted near Kannur, Kerala in South India. The buff-breasted sandpiper has also been recorded in Australia on at least eight occasions. It was recorded again from Madayipara, Kannur in 2023.

In 1978, Phillips recorded the species from Sri Lanka, and after that, very few sightings were recorded. In 2001 a single bird was also recorded in Marievale, South Africa.
