= Mule (nickname) =

As a nickname, Mule may refer to:

== In music ==
- Major Holley (1924–1990), American jazz bassist
- Henry Townsend (musician) (1909–2006), American blues singer, guitarist and pianist

== In sports ==
=== Baseball ===
- George Mule Armstrong (1885–1954), American Negro League baseball player
- Dick Dietz (1941–2005), American Major League Baseball player
- George Mule Haas (1903–1974), American Major League Baseball player
- John Miles (baseball) (1922–2013), American Negro League baseball player
- Ernest Mule Shirley (1901–1955), American Major League Baseball player
- Joe Sprinz (1902–1994), American Major League Baseball player
- George Mule Suttles (1901–1966), American Negro League baseball player
- John Mule Watson (1896–1949), American Major League Baseball pitcher
- Milt Watson (1890–1962), American Major League Baseball player

=== American football ===
- Mule Dowell (1913–1992), American NFL player
- Herschel Stockton (1913–1965), American NFL player
- Fay Mule Wilson (1901–1937), American NFL player

=== Basketball ===
- Reggie King (born 1957), American National Basketball Association player

=== Ice hockey ===
- Johan Franzén (born 1979), Swedish National Hockey League player

== See also ==
- Mule (disambiguation)
- Mule (surname)
