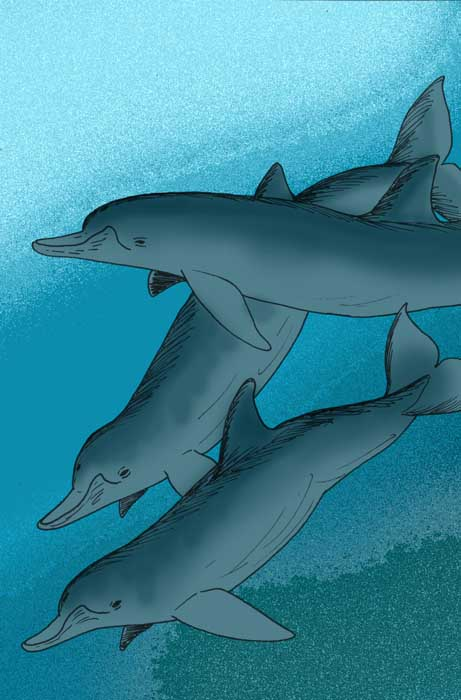
- Artist's reconstruction

Scientific classification
- Kingdom: Animalia
- Phylum: Chordata
- Class: Mammalia
- Order: Artiodactyla
- Infraorder: Cetacea
- Family: Delphinidae
- Genus: †Australodelphis; Fordyce et al., 2002
- Species: †A. mirus

Binomial name
- †Australodelphis mirus Fordyce et al., 2002

= Australodelphis =

Australodelphis Temporal range: Pliocene (4.5 - 4.1 mya)

Extinct genus of mammals

Australodelphis mirus is an extinct Pliocene dolphin. A. mirus is known from fossils found in the Sørsdal Formation, Mule Peninsula, Vestfold Hills, East Antarctica. The genus has been described as an example of convergent evolution with beaked whales.

== Name history ==
The generic name Australodelphis is derived from the Latin australis meaning southern and delphis meaning dolphin, in reference to its discovery in Antarctica. The species name mirus is Latin for strange or wonderful, and was chosen to reflect the unexpected morphology of the type specimen. While not described until 2002, the type specimen of A. mirus was collected between 1985 and 1986, and a further four specimens were found between 1986 and 1994. Prior to the description of Australodelphis in 2002, the genus was mentioned briefly in several publications between 1988 and 1993. The holotype skull was figured in 1988 by R. E. Fordyce and Australodelphis mirus first appeared as a nomen nudum in E. H. Colbert's 1991 "Mesozoic and Cainozoic tetrapod fossils from Antarctica". A second species of Australodelphis was noted by R. E. Fordyce and P. G. Quilty in their 1993 publication on the stratigraphic context of the Marine Plain sediments, but this second species has yet to be formally described.

== Type locality ==
The type locality of the genus marks Australodelphis as the first Pliocene higher vertebrate to be named from Antarctica, and the first cetacean to be named from sediments dating after the final breakup of Gondwana. All known specimens of Australodelphis were recovered from sediments of the Sørsdal Formation which outcrops at Marine Plain about 8 km south of Davis Station in the Vestfold Hills of East Antarctica. The fossils are found in massive to poorly bedded muddy siltstone, dated at 4.5 to 4.1 million years old, placing the sediments in the Early Pliocene. The cetaceans of the Sørsdal Formation are found in association with the extinct diatom Fragilariopsis barronii and the scallop Chlamys tuftensis. Poor sorting and fine-grained sediments, combined with cetacean bones and diatom depositions, indicate the area was a sheltered, shallow, glaciomarine inner shelf.

== Specimens ==
The holotype, CPC 25730, was reconstructed from hundreds of frost-shattered pieces using a combination of polyvinyl acetate and epoxy resin. This prevented the use of acetic acid requiring the use of mechanical methods for specimen preparation. CPC 25730 consists of incomplete right and left mandibles and an incomplete skull missing the basicranium. The other four specimens consist of one partial rostrum, a partial skull consisting of the right side, the rear section of a skull including basicranium, and a partial skull consisting of the narial region and a partial endocranial cast. A number of features of the Australodelphis cranium indicate its position in the family Delphinidae. These feature include asymmetry in the premaxilla ends, an inflated pars cochlearis, and a tympanoperiotic which is not sutured with the squamosal. The genus also shows a number of similarities to the modern genus Mesoplodon, a member of the beaked whale family, Ziphiidae, possessing an elongated toothless rostrum with wide maxillary flanges and laterally compressed tympanic bulla.

== Taxonomic placement ==
The overall suture patterns of the skull are closest to Delphinidae, while the topography of the rostrum and upper side of the skull is very similar to Ziphiidae, making placement of the genus difficult. O. Lambert noted that Australodelphis has rostrum features similar to those of the family Ziphiidae. However, the first true members of Delphinidae appeared in the late Oligocene, thus the last common ancestor of both Delphinidae and Ziphiidae is estimated to have lived 30 million years ago. The evidence, both morphological and temporal, is that Australodelphis is a member of the family Delphinidae. In their discussion of the species Archaeoziphius microglenoideus, the describing authors O. Lambert and S. Louwye note the distinct similarities between ziphiids but reaffirm the placement of Australodelphis. The Messapicetus sp. specimen CMM-V-3138, found in the St. Marys Formation of Calvert Cliffs, Maryland, is noted to be similar enough in structure to possibly be derived from Australodelphis. However, there are enough differences to make this possibility remote. Australodelphis facial structure indicates a probable feeding style similar to the ziphiid whales, consisting of a rapid opening of the mouth to produce suction for capturing soft bodied prey. This is supported by the toothless rostrum which would make catching prey with a pincer movement difficult, and the small size of the temporal muscles. The structure of the nasal area indicates Australodelphis was likely to have enlarged nasiofacial muscles similar to Mesoplodon and indicate a possible ability to generate high-frequency sounds used in echolocation.
