= Mulè =

Mulè is an Italian surname. Notable people with this name include the following:

- Erasmo Mulè (born 1999), Italian professional footballer
- Francesco Mulè (1926–1984), Italian film actor
- Giorgio Mulé (born 1968), Italian politician and journalist
- Giuseppe Mulè (1885–1951), Italian composer and conductor, father of Francesco Mulé

== See also ==
- Mule (disambiguation)
- Mule (surname)
