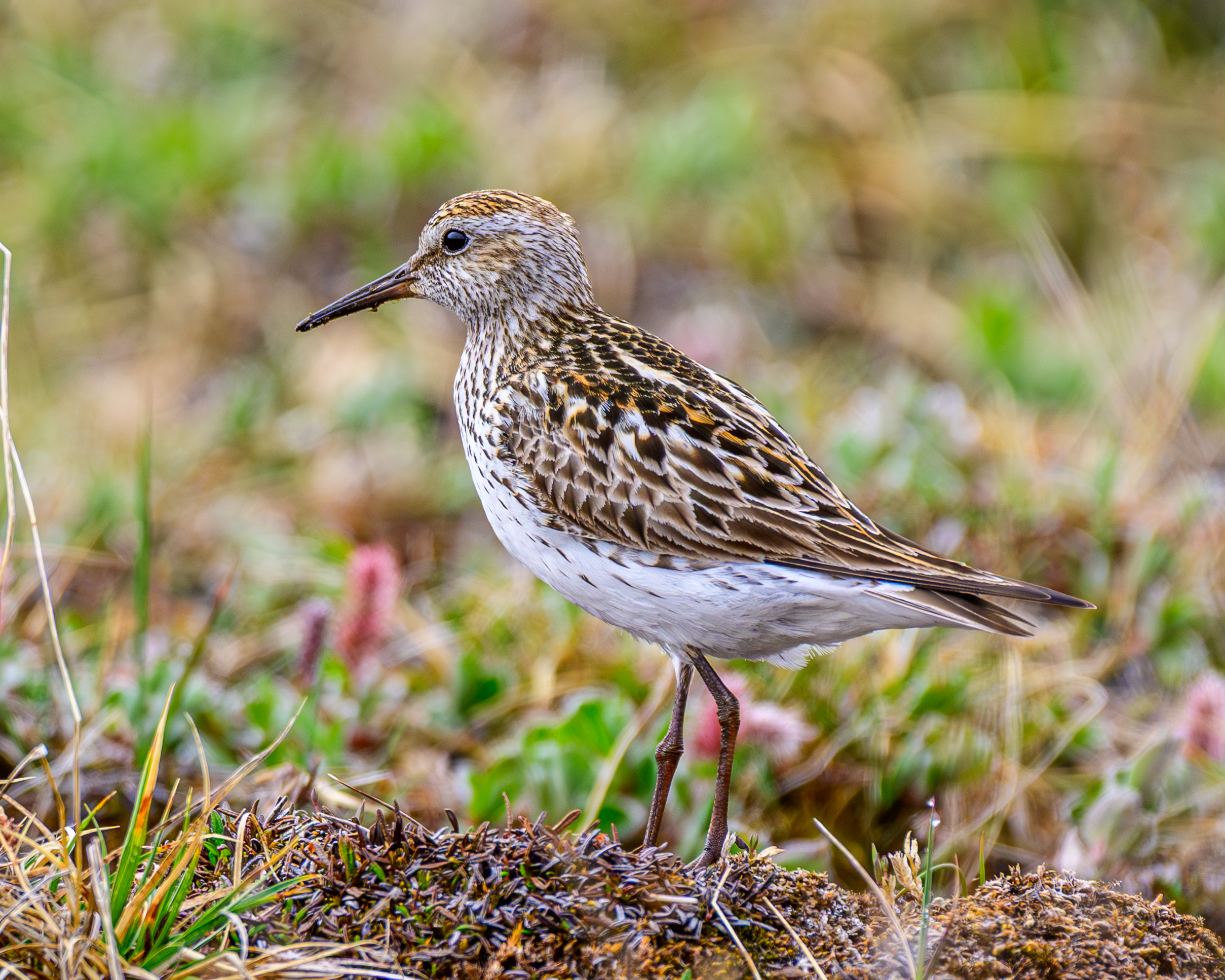

Conservation status
- Vulnerable (IUCN 3.1)

Scientific classification
- Kingdom: Animalia
- Phylum: Chordata
- Class: Aves
- Order: Charadriiformes
- Family: Scolopacidae
- Genus: Calidris
- Species: C. fuscicollis

Binomial name
- Calidris fuscicollis (Vieillot, 1819)
- Breeding Migration Nonbreeding

Synonyms
- Erolia fuscicollis; Tringa fuscicollis (protonym)

= White-rumped sandpiper =

Species of bird

The white-rumped sandpiper (Calidris fuscicollis) is a small migratory shorebird that breeds in the northern tundra of Canada and Alaska. This bird can be difficult to distinguish from other similar tiny shorebirds; these are known collectively as "peeps" or "stints". In flight, it is more easily picked out by its namesake white rump.

== Description ==
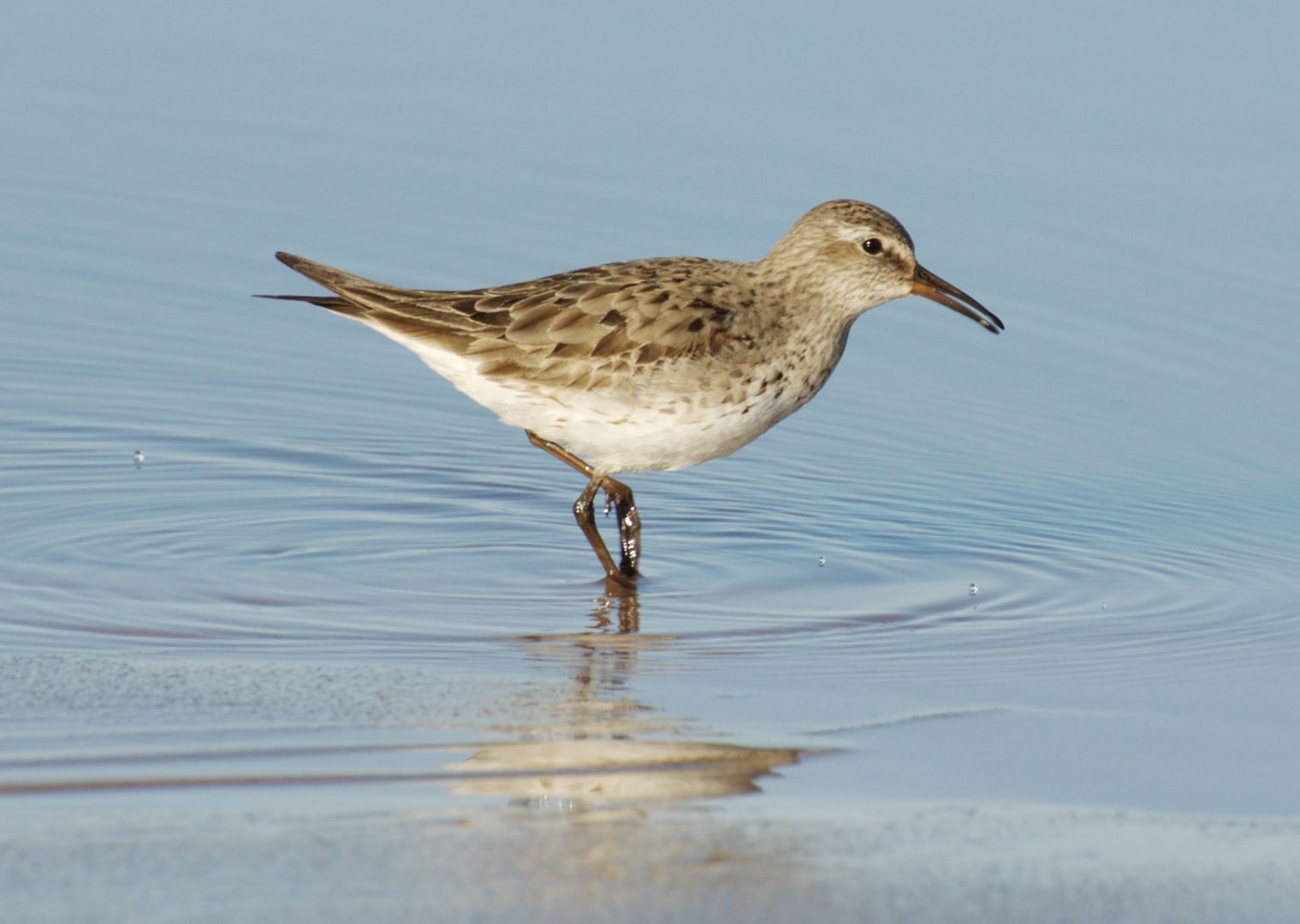
in winter plumage

The white-rumped sandpiper is a relatively small bird measuring only 15–18 cm (5.9–7.1 in), with a wingspan of 36–38 cm (14–15 in). The top of its body is a dull grey-brown colour and it has a white eye stripe. Its beak is of medium length, thin and dark, and its legs are very dark. This bird is often mistaken with many similar-looking sandpipers that live in its range or along its migration path.

The plumage is much less distinct during the winter; however, during all seasons males and females remain similar in their appearance. In adult breeding plumage, the crown and face have a brownish tinge. The supercilium is pale, there are black feathers on the back and there are grey edges on the wing coverts. The breast and flanks are streaked and the underparts are white. In adult winter plumage, the upperparts are a dark grey and at the centers there are black feathers. The underparts are white but the breast is dark grey. The supercilium is white, while the crown and eyeline are darker. The juvenile plumage features black-based feathers on the back and wing coverts. These have brown edges towards the scapulars and whiter edges towards the wing coverts. The breast is finely streaked and there is a white "V" on its back. The underparts and supercilium are white, the crown is brownish in colour, and the face is pale

Standard Measurements
length	15–18 cm (5.9–7.1 in)
wingspan	36–38 cm (14–15 in)
weight	30–60 g (1.1–2.1 oz)
wing	117–126 mm (4.6–5.0 in)
tail	47.5–53.6 mm (1.87–2.11 in)
culmen	20–23.6 mm (0.79–0.93 in)
tarsus	21–24.5 mm (0.83–0.96 in)

=== Identification ===
The two primary features used to identify this bird in the field are its long wings and its white rump. The white patch on the rump can be seen while the bird is in flight. Its long wings extend beyond the tail by about 5–10 mm. Baird's sandpiper also shows this long wing but can be distinguished by the lack of a white rump. There is also a thin white stripe on the wing and a row of marks on the flanks below the wings.

== Distribution and habitat ==
The white-rumped sandpiper inhabits relatively vegetated patches of the tundra. More specifically, they live in the marshy, heavily vegetated, hummocky arctic tundra of Alaska and Canada during the breeding season. They can be found in various types of wetlands while migrating. During the winter months they inhabit a variety of freshwater and saltwater habitats such as lagoons, estuaries and marshes. In general, they tend to avoid sandy beaches and fast moving water.

=== Migration ===
They are a long-distance migrant, wintering in southern South America and the Caribbean. They are considered one of the most extreme long-distance migrants in the world, traversing the entire continent of North America in the span of one month.

The white-rumped sandpiper is a nearctic migrant. After breeding in northern Canada and Alaska, it flies over the Atlantic Ocean to spend the majority of its non-breeding period in South America, particularly along the Patagonian coast in both Chile and Argentina. It also frequently visits Fracasso Beach, Argentina. Many shorebirds concentrate in this area due to the abundance of intertidal invertebrates, especially clams. The white-rumped sandpiper has also been reported in Venezuela, Suriname, Brazil and Paraguay during its migration. They are scarce but regular migrants to western Europe (where it is regular in small numbers, with a peak count of 51 recorded in Great Britain in 2019) and a rare vagrant to Australia.

The birds migrate with both nonstop and short-distance multiple-stop flights. During their migration from north to south, they fly over the Atlantic Ocean, gradually moving along the northeastern coast of South America before heading inland towards the islands. This travel generally takes about one month. On their migration from south to north, the white-rumped sandpiper follows a similar path, but does it much more quickly. This migration is done in a fast series of long flights without stopping. One nonstop flight can be as long as 4,200 km (2,600 mi).

Weather patterns play a crucial role in determining the migration route. Birds like to travel so that the temperature, pressure and humidity work with the tailwinds. Strong winds can blow birds off of their regular migration route. For example, the effects of a large storm lead to a higher presence of the white-rumped sandpiper on the King George Islands.

=== Effects of climate change ===
The warming of the climate has led to changes in the number of individuals and the length of their stay in the South Shetland Islands. White-rumped sandpipers are now observed more frequently in this area as a result of both long and short term climate variations. The higher air temperatures, which occur as a result of the northern winds, bring warm, moist air which creates more open habitats and better food resources that allow these birds to persist and survive. Migration routes, as well as both winter and summer foraging grounds, may also be altered.

== Behaviour ==
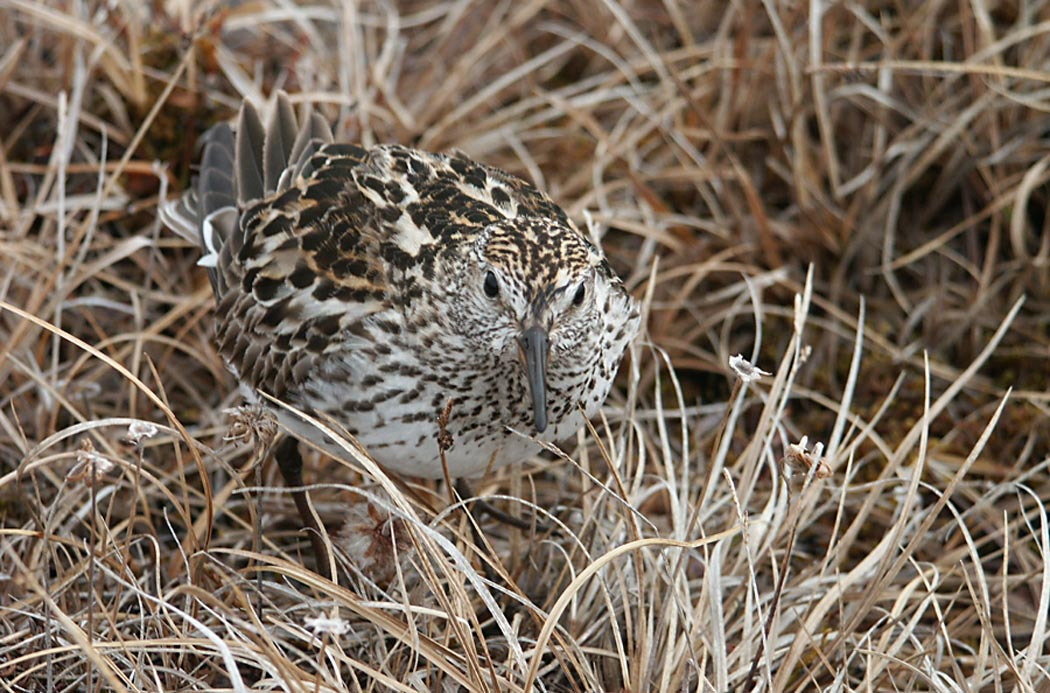
Cryptic coloration aids in camouflage

=== Vocalizations ===
One of the white-rumped sandpiper vocalizations consists of a repeating "pip, pip, pip …" Their call has a distinctive metallic "tzeep" note which makes them easily identifiable among a flock of shorebirds. It resembles the sound of two pebbles scraping against one another.

=== Food and feeding ===
Their diet consists primarily of small invertebrates including: molluscs, crustaceans, polychaetes, annelids and both adult and larval insects. They are mainly reported to eat aquatic invertebrates. Although it was previously thought they only consumed invertebrates, it has been shown that seeds and moss also make up a portion of the white-rumped sandpiper diet. This discovery lead to the idea that they might be opportunistic feeders depending on time, season and habitat. Stones and algae have also been found in their stomachs but these are most likely ingested by accident. The stones are of the same general shape and size as the seeds so it could be a case of mistaken identity. Algae could also be accidentally ingested through aquatic feeding.

While on mudflats, the white-rumped sandpiper forages by probing in shallow waters and in mud but can also pick up some items from the surface. When they are in the tundra, they must probe deeply in the moss and other vegetation.

=== Breeding ===
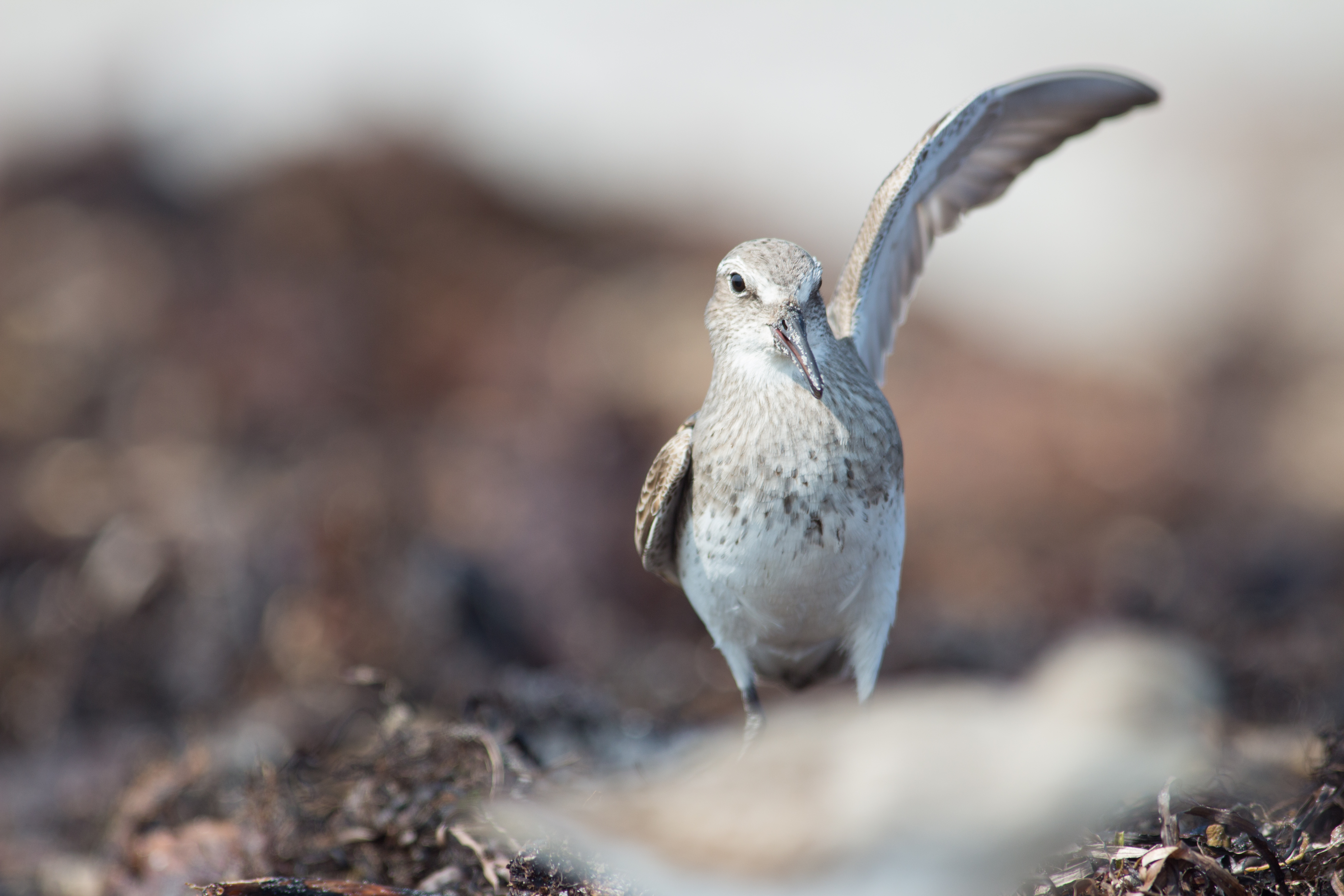
Wing raising display

As with most shorebirds, the courtship behaviour of the white-rumped sandpiper involves an aerial component. During courtship the male and the female fly upward side by side at an angle. At about 10 m (33 ft) above the ground they stop about 0.5 m (1.6 ft) apart and hover with shallow, rapidly vibrating wingbeats. The male remains above the female and repeatedly releases a series of "poing-zee" notes. They hover between 5 and 10 seconds before descending to the ground slowly and silently and land about 2 m (6.6 ft) apart. During their downward glide their wings are held together in a "V" position above their backs. A few minutes later they initiate a second paired flight identical to the first one. However, once they have landed on the ground the male begins to chase the female. The chase ends when the male does a wing raising display, which is common in many sandpiper species.

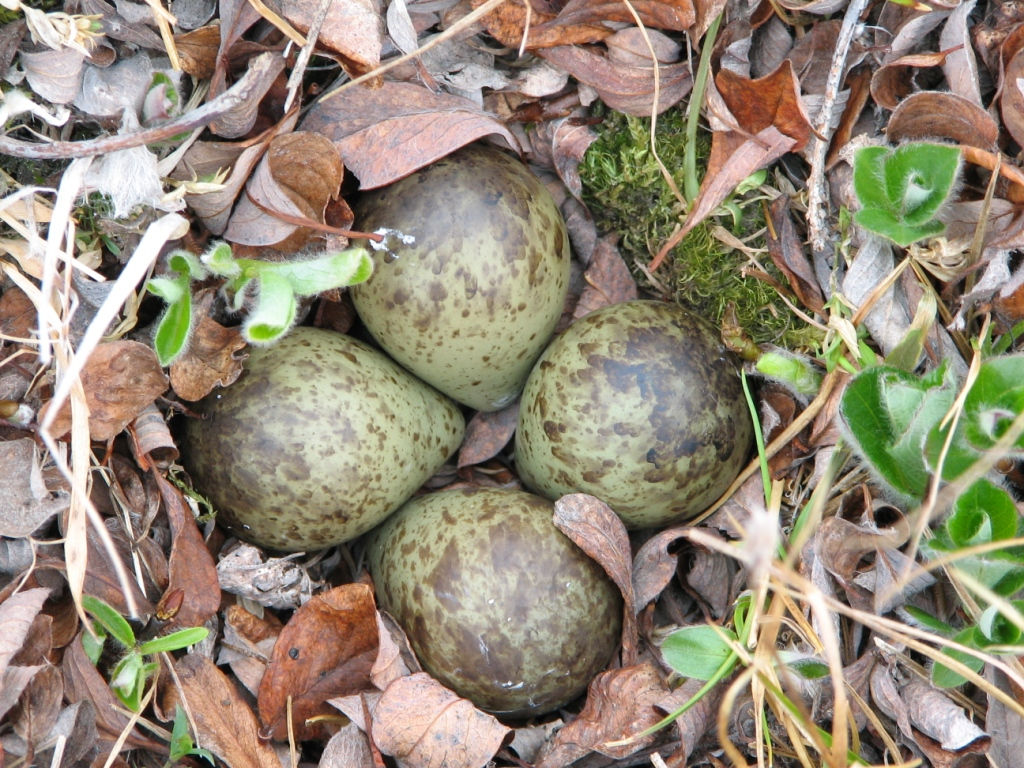
Eggs in a nest

The females build the nest which is a cup-shaped depression in the ground. The nest is lined with pieces of lichen, leaves and moss which can occur naturally or can be added by the female. The nests are generally well hidden in a clump of moss or grass. Males defend the breeding territory by gliding and fluttering above it while making oinking and rattling sounds. When on the ground, the male stretches its wing out to the side and raises its tail into the air to display the white patch on its rump. He then walks and runs while repeating a call.

The females are small and nest in the high arctic, which means they are more likely under a higher cold stress than birds nesting in temperate areas. Consequently, the females spend an average of 82.5% of their time incubating their eggs. In total, the females incubate the eggs for about 22 days. She generally lays 4 olive to green eggs; laying 3 eggs is rare. The eggs can sometimes be blotched with brown, olive-brown or grey spots.

Only the females incubate the eggs. Once the female has laid the eggs, the male stops displaying and leaves the breeding grounds. This is unlike other members of the calidris genus where incubation is shared between males and females; therefore, the trait of male incubation has been independently lost in this species. There are only three documented species who have been known to share this behaviour. This development seems bizarre since experiments have shown that a decrease in the amount of male care is linked to a decrease in male fitness by lowering the number of male descendants that survive. One explanation for this evolution is that a decrease in male care allows the males to explore other breeding options. This hypothesis ties in with the fact that the white-rumped sandpiper is polygynous; males will mate with several females but females will only mate with one male.

The young are covered in down feathers and leave the nest about a day after hatching. The female will tend to them by brooding them and keeping them warm, but they must find all their own food. Their first flight is at the age of about 16–17 days and soon after that they become independent.

== Taxonomy ==
The white-rumped sandpiper was formally described in 1819 by the French ornithologist Louis Vieillot under the binomial name Tringa fuscicollis. The specific epithet combines Latin fuscus meaning "dusky" or "brown" with Modern Latin -collis meaning "-necked" or "-throated". Vieillot based his account on the "Del Pestorijo Pardo" from Paraguay that had been described in 1805 by the Spanish naturalist Félix de Azara. The white-rumped sandpiper is now placed with 23 other species in the genus Calidris that was introduced in 1804 by the German naturalist Blasius Merrem. The species is monotypic, with no subspecies recognised. A 2022 molecular phylogenetic study by David Černý and Rossy Natale found that the white-rumped sandpiper was sister to the least sandpiper (Calidris minutilla).

The white-rumped sandpiper is placed in the order Charadriiformes along with gulls, alcids, plovers and oystercatchers. Its family, Scolopacidae, encompasses all sandpipers, and as a stint it is classified in the genus Calidris. Hybrids between this species and the dunlin are occasionally found in northeastern North America. The white-rumped sandpiper is also suspected to hybridize with the buff-breasted sandpiper.
