= Hybridisation in shorebirds =

Cross-species reproduction in birds

Hybridisation in shorebirds has been proven on only a small number of occasions; however, many individual shorebirds have been recorded by birdwatchers worldwide that do not fit the characters of known species. Many of these have been suspected of being hybrids. In several cases, shorebird hybrids have been described as new species before their hybrid origin was discovered. Compared to other groups of birds (such as gulls), only a few species of shorebirds are known or suspected to hybridise, but nonetheless, these hybrids occur quite frequently in some cases.

== Hybrids in the Scolopaci (sandpipers and allies) ==
=== "Cooper's" and "Cox's" sandpipers ===
An apparently new sandpiper species ("Cooper's sandpiper Tringa/Calidris cooperi") was described in 1858 based on a specimen collected in 1833 on Long Island, New York. A similar bird was collected in 1981 at Stockton, New South Wales, Australia. These are probably hybrids between the curlew sandpiper (Calidris ferruginea) and the sharp-tailed sandpiper (Calidris acuminata).

Cox's sandpiper, described as a new species (Calidris paramelanotos) in 1982, is now known to be a stereotyped hybrid between males of the pectoral sandpiper (Calidris melanotos) and female curlew sandpipers. It is known from nearly two dozen sightings since the 1950s, almost all of which are from Australia, with one record from Massachusetts. and another from Japan.

=== Other hybrid scolopacids ===
An unusual stint at Groote Keeten in the Netherlands was initially thought to be that country's first record of the least sandpiper, but showed anomalous features for that species, and was postulated to instead be a hybrid between little stint (Calidris minuta) and Temminck's stint (Calidris temminckii).

Putative hybrids between the dunlin (Calidris alpina) and the white-rumped sandpiper (Calidris fuscicollis) have been occasionally seen in northeastern North America. In Europe an apparent hybrid between the dunlin and the purple sandpiper (Calidris maritima) has turned up.

Courtship and copulation have also been observed between common (Actitis hypoleucos) and spotted sandpipers (Actitis macularia), but there are no records of hybrid offspring.

== Hybridisation in the Charadrii (oystercatchers, stilts and avocets, and plovers) ==
Hybridisation between American (Haematopus palliatus frazari) and black oystercatchers (Haematopus bachmani) is relatively common in northwestern Mexico and adjacent southern California. Hybridisation also occurs between variable oystercatchers (Haematopus unicolor) and South Island pied oystercatchers (Haematopus finschi) in New Zealand.

The "avostilt" or "stavocet" is a hybrid between black-necked stilt (Himantopus mexicanus) and American avocet (Recurvirostra americana), occasionally found in California. One such bird was accidentally bred in the San Francisco Zoo in 1971 and lived at least until 1974. The avocet was the father and the stilt the mother of this individual, which apparently was a male.

The nearly extinct New Zealand black stilt (Himantopus novaezelandiae) hybridises with the pied stilt (Himantopus leucocephalus), which jeopardizes the survival of the former species. Other stilt taxa are known or suspected to hybridise where their ranges meet, namely black-winged (Himantopus himantopus) and pied stilts in maritime Southeast Asia and white-backed (Himantopus melanurus) and black-necked stilts in South America; the latter two are often considered conspecific, as are, less commonly, all black-and-white stilt taxa around the world.

A Pluvialis plover wintering with a flock of European golden plover (Pluvialis apricaria) near Marksbury, England, in 1987 was believed to be possibly a hybrid between that species and Pacific golden plover (Pluvialis fulva).

In 1990, a Northern lapwing and a Sociable lapwing bred in Finland, but the eggs failed to hatch.

== See also ==
- Bird hybrid
- Hybridisation in gulls which also belong in the order Charadriiformes
