= Mule Island =

Island in Antarctica

- Location within Antarctica

Geography
- Location: Antarctica
- Coordinates: 68°39′S 77°50′E

Administration
- Administered under the Antarctic Treaty System

Demographics
- Population: Uninhabited

Mule Island is a small island lying immediately southwest of Hawker Island, off the west tip of Mule Peninsula, Vestfold Hills, in Prydz Bay, Antarctica. It was mapped by Norwegian cartographers from air photos taken by the Lars Christensen Expedition (1936–37) and named "Muloy" (snout island).

== See also ==
- List of antarctic and sub-antarctic islands
