= Mules (surname) =

Mules is a surname. Notable people with this surname include:

- Charles Mules (1837–1927), third Anglican Bishop of Nelson, New Zealand
- Horace Charles Mules, Commissioner in Sind, British India, from 1903 to 1904
- John W. H. Mules, after whom the practice of Mulesing is named
- Justine Mules (born 1994), Australian rules footballer
