= Hawker Island =

Island in Princess Elizabeth Land, Antarctica

- Location within Antarctica

Geography
- Location: Antarctica
- Coordinates: 68°38′S 77°51′E

Administration
- Administered under the Antarctic Treaty System

Demographics
- Population: Uninhabited

Hawker Island is an irregularly shaped island about 2 km (1.2 mi) long, lying some 7 km south-west of Davis Station between Mule Island and Mule Peninsula, Vestfold Hills, in the eastern part of Prydz Bay, Antarctica. It was mapped by Norwegian cartographers from aerial photographs taken by the Lars Christensen Expedition, 1936–37. It was remapped by the Australian National Antarctic Research Expeditions (1957–58) and named after Alan Charles Hawker, a radio supervisor at Davis Station in 1957.

== Birds ==
The island supports a breeding colony of southern giant petrels – the southernmost such colony on continental Antarctica – as well as Adélie penguins and Cape petrels. The site is protected under the Antarctic Treaty System as Antarctic Specially Protected Area (ASPA) No.167.

== See also ==
- List of Antarctic and subantarctic islands
