= Gamebird hybrids =

Result of crossing species of game birds

Gamebird hybrids are the result of crossing species of game birds, including ducks, with each other and with domestic poultry. These hybrid species may sometimes occur naturally in the wild or more commonly through the deliberate or inadvertent intervention of humans.

Charles Darwin described hybrids of game birds and domestic fowl in The Variation of Animals and Plants Under Domestication:

Mr. Hewitt, who has had great experience in crossing tame cock-pheasants with fowls belonging to five breeds, gives as the character of all 'extraordinary wildness' (13/42. 'The Poultry Book' by Tegetmeier 1866 pages 165, 167.); but I have myself seen one exception to this rule. Mr. S. J. Salter (13/43. 'Natural History Review' 1863 April page 277.) who raised a large number of hybrids from a bantam-hen by Gallus sonneratii, states that 'all were exceedingly wild.' [...] utterly sterile male hybrids from the pheasant and the fowl act in the same manner, "their delight being to watch when the hens leave their nests, and to take on themselves the office of a sitter." (13/57. 'Cottage Gardener' 1860 page 379.) [...] Mr. Hewitt gives it as a general rule with fowls, that crossing the breed increases their size. He makes this remark after stating that hybrids from the pheasant and fowl are considerably larger than either progenitor: so again, hybrids from the male golden pheasant and female common pheasant "are of far larger size than either parent-bird.' (17/39. Ibid 1866 page 167; and 'Poultry Chronicle' volume 3 1855 page 15.)"

== Pheasant and grouse hybrids ==
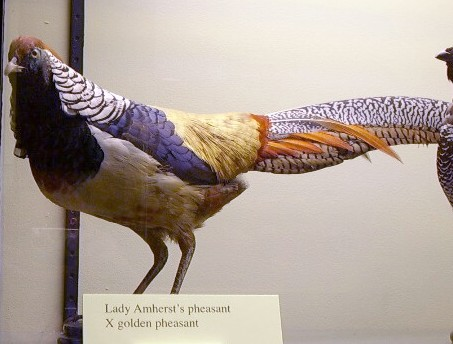
Hybrid of Lady Amherst's pheasant × golden pheasant, Rothschild Museum, Tring

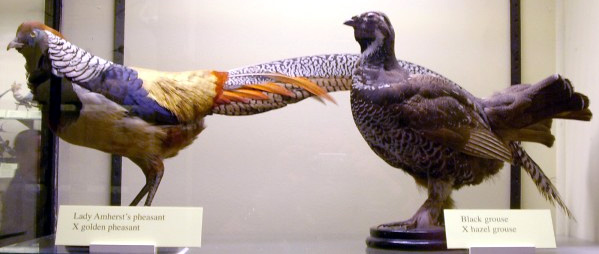
Hybrid pheasant (left) and hybrid of black grouse × hazel grouse (right), Rothschild Museum, Tring

Hybrids have been obtained between the "ornamental" species of pheasants e.g. Lady Amherst's, silver and Reeves's pheasants.

Natural pheasant and grouse hybrids have been reported:

- Capercaillie or wood grouse (Tetrao urogallus) and black grouse (Tetrao tetrix) in the UK
- Dusky or blue grouse (Dendragapus obscurus) and common pheasant (Phasianus colchicus) near Portland, Oregon, United States
- Sharp-tailed grouse (Tympanuchus phasianellus) and greater prairie chicken (Tympanuchus cupido)
- Willow ptarmigan (Lagopus lagopus) and spruce grouse (Falcipennis canadensis)

== Chicken hybrids ==
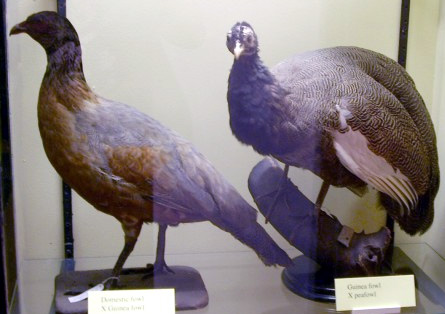
Domestic fowl × guineafowl hybrid (left) and guinea fowl × peafowl hybrid (right), Rothschild Museum, Tring

Charles Darwin mentioned crosses between domestic fowl and pheasants in Origin of Species

[...] from observations communicated to me by Mr. Hewitt, who has had great experience in hybridising pheasants and fowls

and later in The Variation of Animals and Plants Under Domestication (top of this page), where he mentioned effeminate behaviour in the male hybrids.

In her book Bird Hybrids, A. P. Gray lists numerous crosses between chickens (Gallus gallus) and other types of fowl. Domestic fowl can be crossed, and produce fertile offspring, with silver pheasants, red junglefowl and green junglefowl. They have also produced hybrids with peafowl, chachalacas, capercaillie, grouse, quail, curassows, pheasants and guans.

Domestic fowl have been crossed with guineafowl and also with common pheasant (Phasianus colchicus). Domestic fowl/pheasant hybrids have also occurred naturally. Domestic chickens and Japanese quail (Coturnix japonica) have been hybridised using artificial insemination.

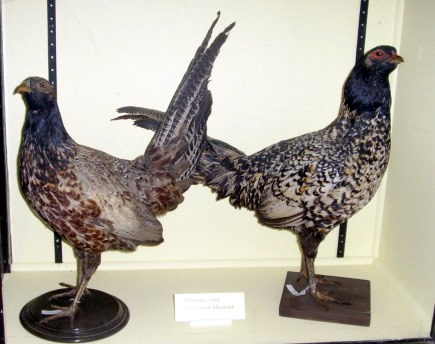
Two hybrids between chickens and the common pheasant, Rothschild Museum, Tring

The peafowl (Pavo cristatus) from Asia and the common guineafowl (Numida meleagris) from Africa have been crossed.

== Chicken and turkey hybrids ==
There have been attempted crosses between domestic turkeys (Meleagris gallopavo) and chickens. According to Gray, no hybrids hatched in twelve studies. Other reports found only a few fertile eggs were produced and very few resulted in advanced embryos. According to Olsen, 23 hybrids were obtained from 302 embryos which resulted from 2,132 eggs. Dark Cornish cockerels and Rhode Island Red cockerels successfully fertilised turkey eggs. Harada & Buss reported hybridisation experiments between Beltsville Small White Turkeys and two strains of chickens. When male chickens inseminated female turkeys, both male and female embryos form, but the males are much less viable and usually die in the early stages of development. When male turkeys inseminated female chickens, no hybrids resulted; however, the unfertilised chicken eggs began to divide. According to Olsen, turkey-chicken crosses produced all males.

A supposed turkey × pheasant hybrid was reported by Edwards in 1761.

A hybrid of a wild turkey and ocellated turkey was reported in 1956.

== Duck hybrids ==
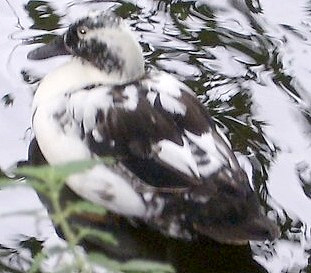
Hybrid of mallard duck × Muscovy duck

Charles Darwin also described duck hybrids in The Variation of Animals and Plants Under Domestication:

Hybrids are often raised between the common and musk duck, and I have been assured by three persons, who have kept these crossed birds, that they were not wild; but Mr. Garnett (13/45. As stated by Mr. Orton in his 'Physiology of Breeding' page 12.) observed that his hybrids were wild, and exhibited 'migratory propensities' of which there is not a vestige in the common or musk duck.

Hybrids between mallard ducks and Aylesbury ducks (a white domestic breed derived from the mallard) are frequently seen in British parks where the two types are present. The hybrids often resemble a dark coloured mallard with a white breast. Mallard ducks also hybridise with the Muscovy duck producing pied offspring.

Hybrids between the ruddy duck and white-headed duck are undesirable in parts of Europe where the introduced ruddy duck has bred with native white-headed ducks. The increasing number of ruddy ducks and hybrids threatens the existence of the white-headed ducks, resulting in shooting campaigns to remove the introduced species. This is controversial as some believe that nature should be allowed to take its course, even though this favours the more successful introduced species.

Duck-chicken chimera was prepared by transferring donor germ cells into embryo cavity of zygote. The transfer of dermal cells into recipient embryos to produce chimerism provides a basis for studying the barriers to fertilization in interspecific reproductive chimerism. This will help protect endangered birds, contribute to a better understanding of poultry physiology and embryonic development, and provide technical methods for poultry transgenic.

Hybrid ducks of the genus Aythya include birds that are a mixture of tufted duck, greater scaup, pochard, ferruginous duck and ring-necked duck.

List of duck hybrids:

- Northern pintail × mallard
- Ruddy duck × white-headed duck
- Ruddy shelduck × shelduck
- White-faced whistling duck × plumed whistling duck
- Baikal teal × northern pintail
- Hooded merganser × smew
- Eurasian wigeon × American wigeon
- Mallard × grey duck, a subspecies of the Pacific black duck.

See also Mariana mallard.

== Goose hybrids ==
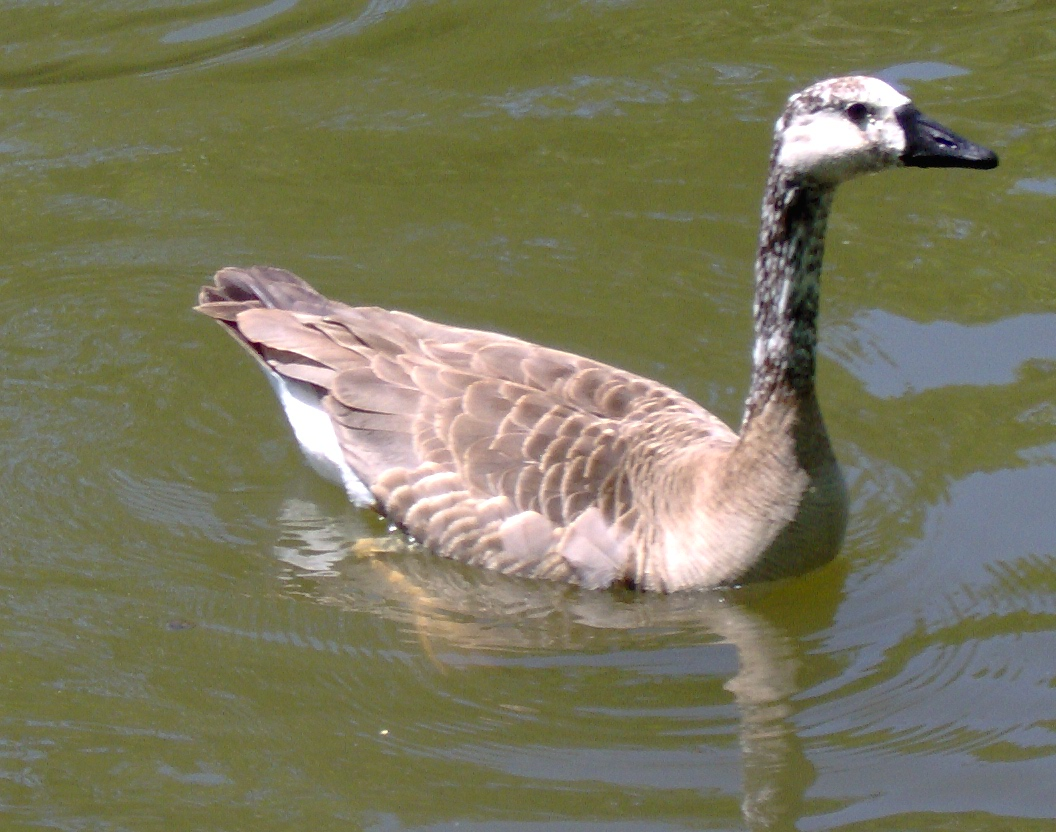
A hybrid between a domestic goose and a Canada goose

Goose hybrids include Canada goose × greylag goose, Canada goose × domesticated geese, emperor goose × Canada goose, red-breasted goose × Canada goose, Canada goose × white-fronted goose and barnacle goose × Canada goose.

== See also ==
- Bird hybrid
- Haldane's rule
