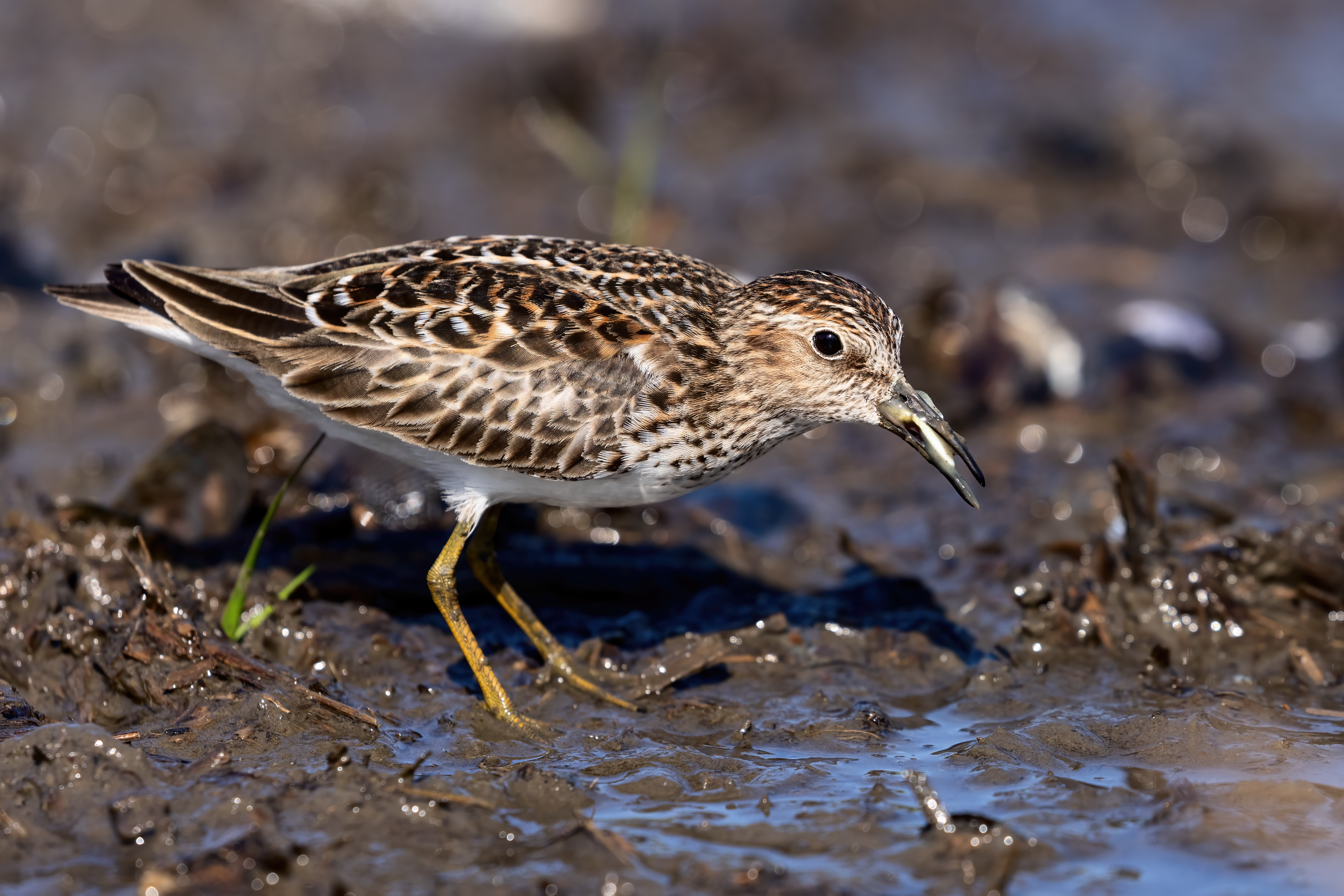
- Summer plumage
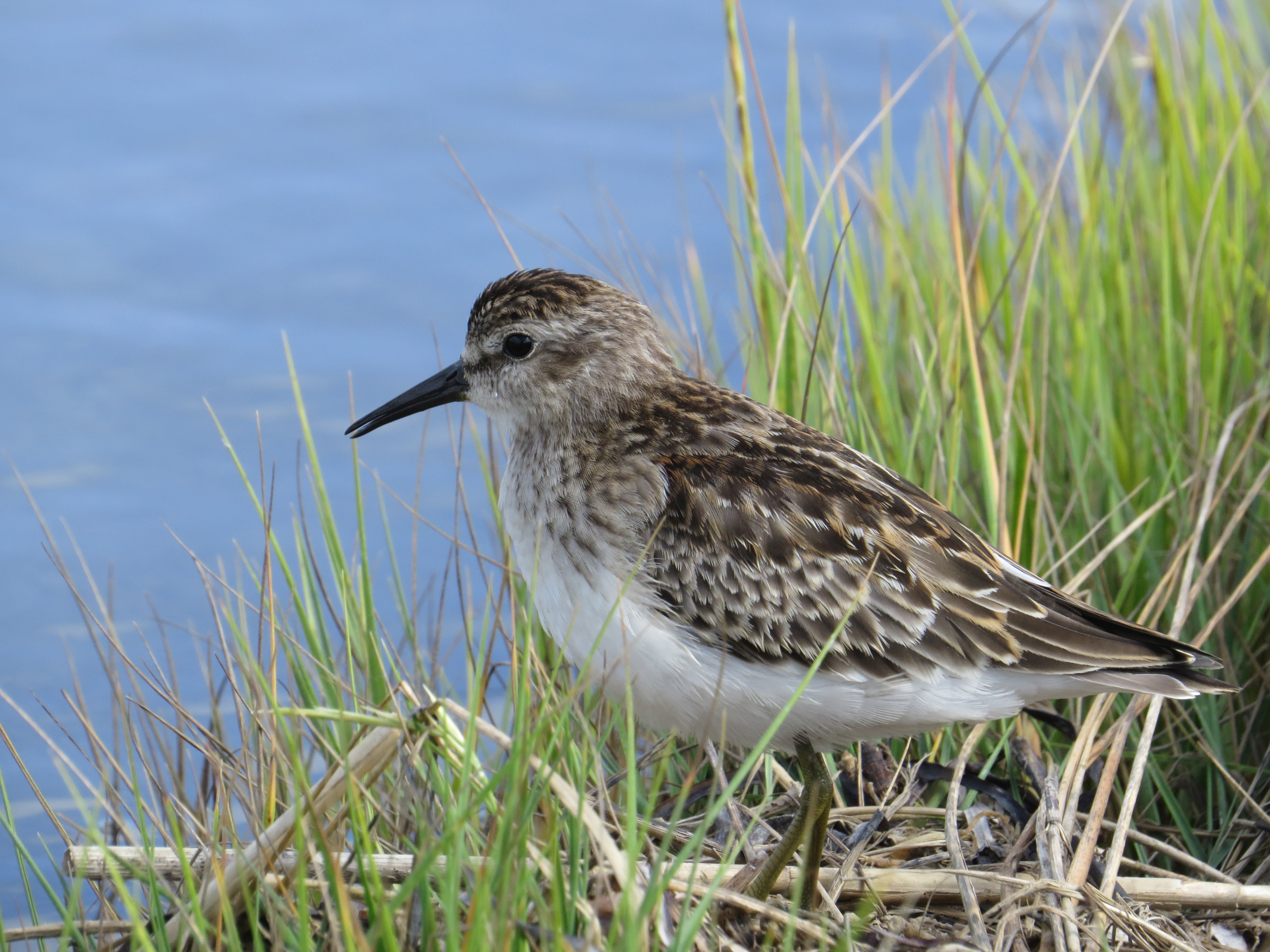
- Winter plumage

Conservation status
- Near Threatened (IUCN 3.1)

Scientific classification
- Kingdom: Animalia
- Phylum: Chordata
- Class: Aves
- Order: Charadriiformes
- Family: Scolopacidae
- Genus: Calidris
- Species: C. minutilla

Binomial name
- Calidris minutilla (Vieillot, 1819)
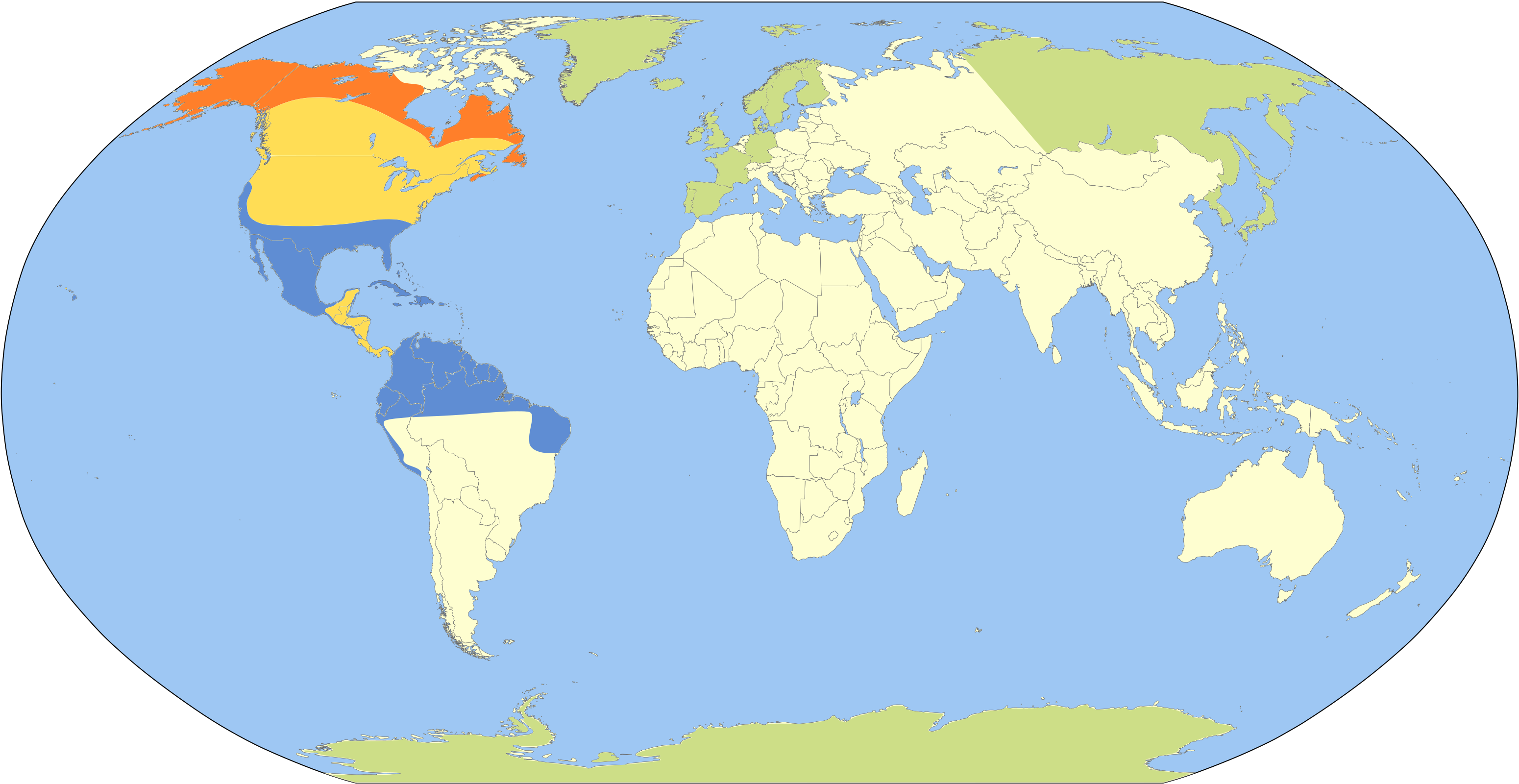
- Breeding Migration Nonbreeding Vagrant

Synonyms
- Erolia minutilla

= Least sandpiper =

Species of bird

The least sandpiper (Calidris minutilla) is the smallest shorebird. The genus name is from Ancient Greek kalidris or skalidris, a term used by Aristotle for some grey-coloured waterside birds. The specific minutilla is Medieval Latin for "very small".

Within the genus Calidris, the least sandpiper is most closely related to the white-rumped sandpiper (Calidris fuscicollis).

== Description ==
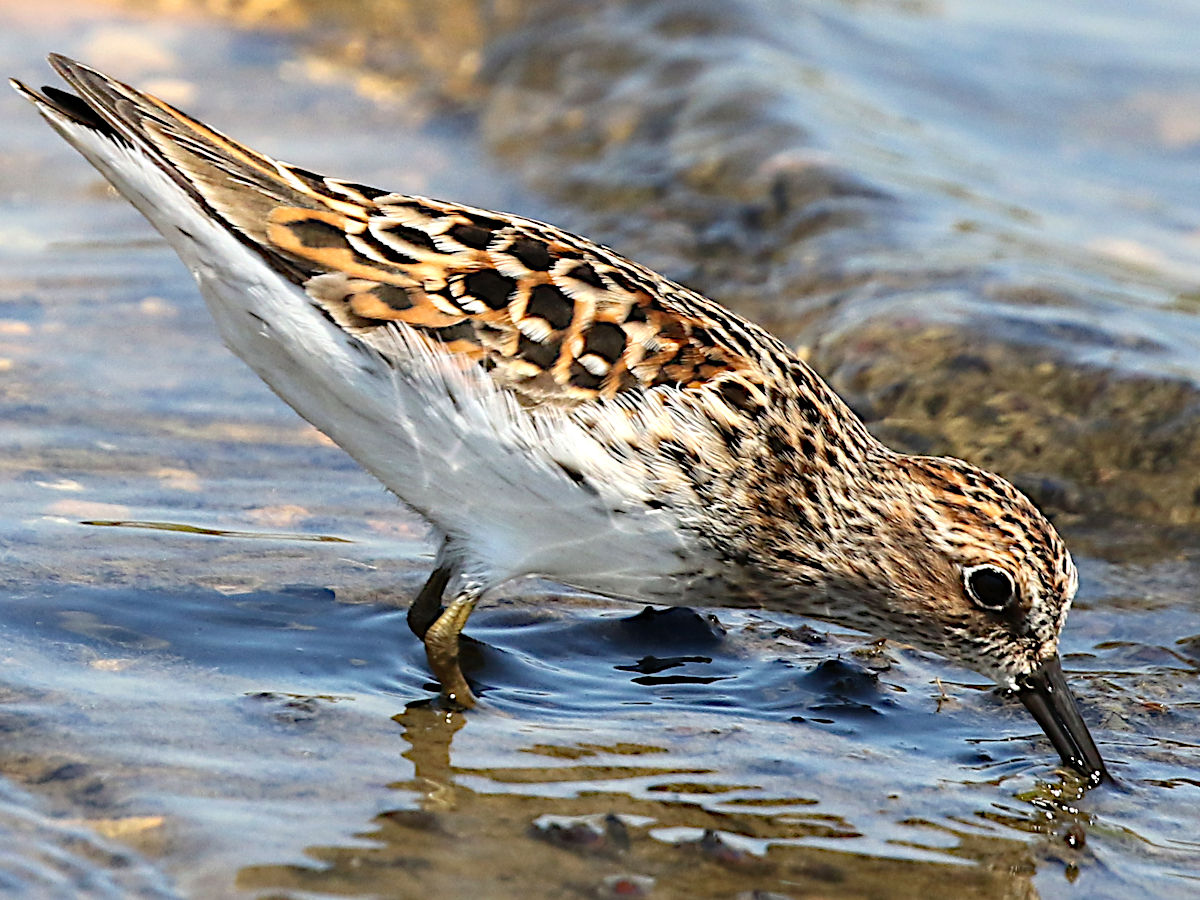
Foraging

This species has yellow-green legs and a short, thin, dark bill. Breeding adults are brown with dark brown streaks on top and white underneath. They have a light line above the eye and a dark crown. In winter, Least sandpipers are grey above. The juveniles are brightly patterned above with rufous colour and white mantle stripes.

This bird can be difficult to distinguish from other similar tiny shorebirds; these are known collectively as "peeps" or "stints". In particular, least sandpiper is very similar to its Asian counterpart, long-toed stint. It differs from that species in its more compact, shorter-necked appearance, shorter toes, somewhat duller colour, and stronger wingbar.

Measurements:

- Length: 13–15 cm (5.1–5.9 in)
- Wingspan: 27–28 cm (11–11 in)
- Weight: 19–30 g (0.67–1.06 oz)

== Breeding and migration ==
Their breeding habitat is the northern North American continent on tundra or in bogs. They nest on the ground near water. The female lays four eggs in a shallow scrape lined with grass and moss. Both parents incubate; the female leaves before the young birds fledge and sometimes before the eggs hatch. The young birds feed themselves and are able to fly within two weeks of birth.

They migrate in flocks to the southern United States, Mexico, Central America, the Caribbean, and northern South America. They occur as very rare vagrants in western Europe.

== Feeding ==
These birds forage on mudflats, picking up food by sight, sometimes by probing. They mainly eat small crustaceans, insects, and snails. While migrating through the Delaware Bay, least sandpipers eat worms, detritus, and the eggs of horseshoe crabs.

Foraging on a mudflat. Video plays at 50% of normal speed
