= Irina Zolotova =

Armenian musicologist and composer (1947–2025)

- Իրինա Լեոնիդովնա Զոլոտովա
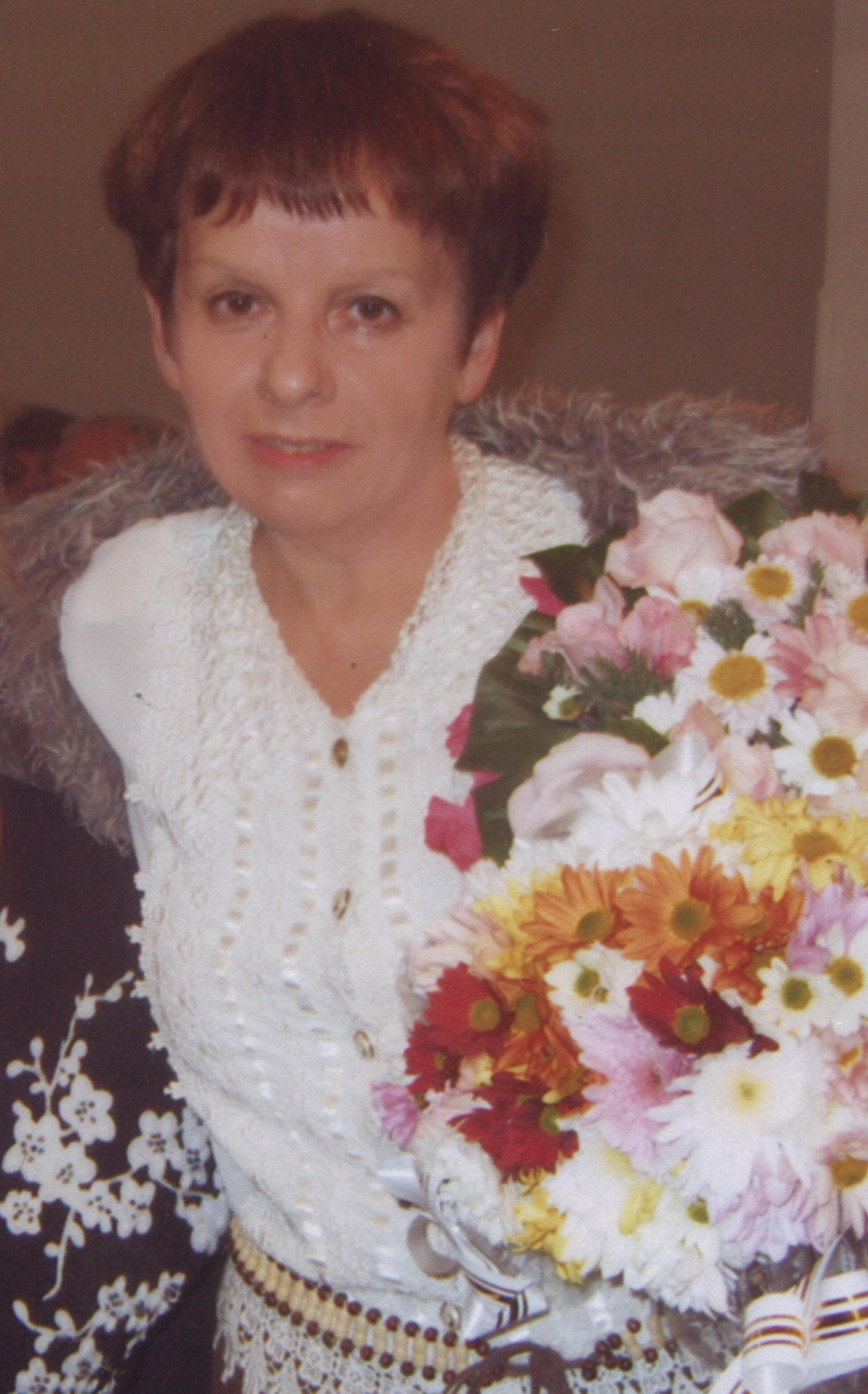
- In Yerevan in 2009
- Born: 14 June 1947
- Died: 11 November 2025 (aged 78)
- Occupations: Musicologist, music critic, composer, academic

Irina Leonidovna Zolotova (Armenian: Իրինա Լեոնիդովնա Զոլոտովա; 14 June 1947 – 11 November 2025) was an Armenian musicologist, music critic, composer, and academic. She was awarded the title Honoured Cultural Worker of the Republic of Armenia in 2022.
