= Hybridisation in terns =

Cross-species reproduction in birds

Hybridisation in terns is not as frequent as in gulls; however, some mixed pairings have been noted.

== Marsh terns (Chlidonias sp.) ==
Hybridisation between white-winged black tern (C. leucopterus) and black tern (C. niger) has been recorded from Sweden and the Netherlands. Two juvenile birds at Chew Valley Lake, England, in September 1978 and September 1981, were also believed to be hybrids; they showed mixed characteristics of the two species, specifically a combination of a dark mantle (a feature of white-winged black) with dark patches on the breast-side (a feature of black tern, not shown by white-winged black).

== Sternula sp. ==
Hybrids between little tern (S. albifrons) and fairy tern (S. neresis) have been found in Australia. The two species formerly had discrete ranges, but range expansion after 1968 has led to overlapping range and shared colonies.

== Sterna sp. ==
This genus contains the highest number of reported hybrids among the terns. Hybrids between the common tern (S. hirundo) and its congeners, including the roseate tern (S. dougallii) and arctic tern (S. paradisaea) have occurred where their ranges overlap. A hybrid roseate × arctic tern was reported from Country Island, Nova Scotia in 1996. Hybridisation between Forster's tern (S. forsteri) × arctic tern has been reported from Hayward Regional Shoreline, California. Genetic analysis has indicated that black-naped tern (S. sumatrana) × roseate tern hybridisation may have occurred in the ancestry of a sequenced individual, but no morphological characteristics indicated that the individual was a hybrid.

== Thalasseus sp. ==
Four hybrid pairings have been documented within this genus:

- Greater crested tern (T. bergii) × Chinese crested tern (T. bernsteini) in China
- Lesser crested tern (T. bengalensis) × Sandwich tern (T. sandvicensis) in Spain
- Elegant tern (T. elegans) × Sandwich tern in France and Spain
- Elegant tern × Cabot's tern (T. acuflavidus) in California, Florida, and Isla Rasa, Mexico.

== See also ==
- Hybridisation in gulls
