= Mule Point =

Headland in Antarctica

Mule Point (67°5′S 58°12′E) is a rocky point just south of East Stack, at the east side of Hoseason Glacier. Mapped by Norwegian cartographers from aerial photographers taken by the Lars Christensen Expedition, 1936–37, and called Mule (snout).
