= Muel =

Muel may refer to:

- Muel, Zaragoza, a municipality in the province of Zaragoza, in the autonomous community of Aragon, Spain
- Muel, Ille-et-Vilaine, a commune in the Ille-et-Vilaine department in Brittany in northwestern France.

== See also ==
- Mule
