= Mule (surname) =

Mule is a surname which may refer to:

- Christen Mule (died 1589), merchant and Mayor of Oslo, Norway
- Marcel Mule (1901–2001), classical saxophonist

== See also ==
- Mulè
- Mules (disambiguation)
