= British finches =

Several species used as cage birds

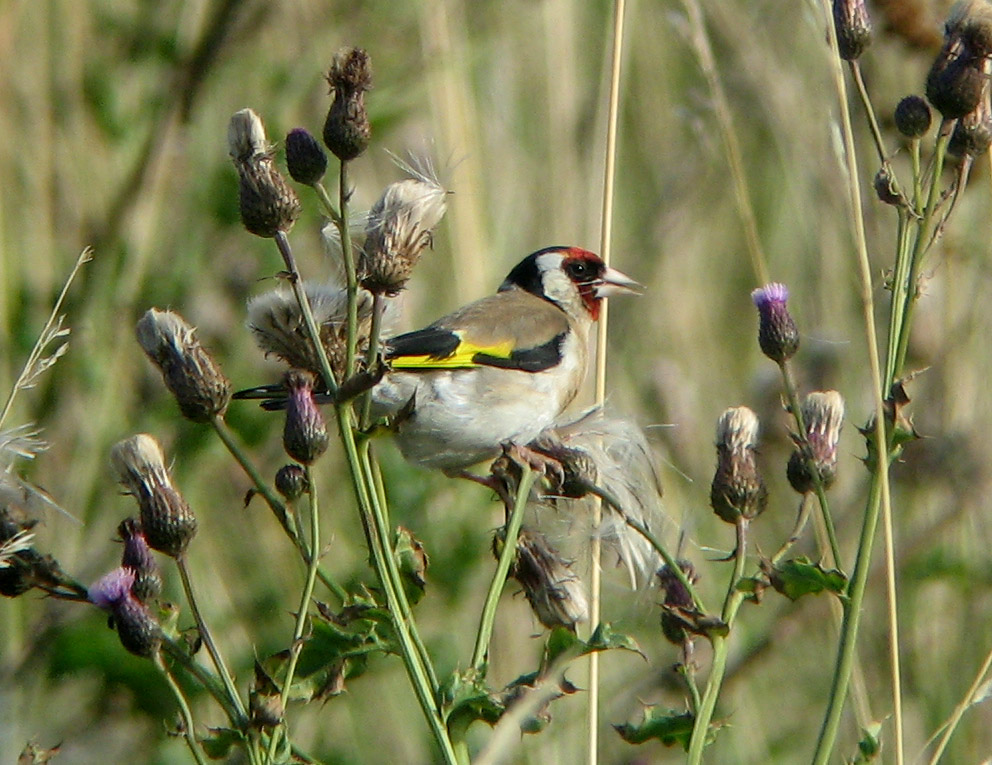
Goldfinches were once caught in thousands to be kept as cage birds.

The British finches are made up of several species of finch which were formerly very popular as cage birds in Great Britain. They are not currently commonplace, but are still kept by a few dedicated fanciers.

== History ==
In Victorian times British finches were hugely popular as cage birds throughout the British Isles, often replacing canaries. Due to a lack of protection, thousands of birds were captured for the pet trade every year.

Their popularity is reflected in the well-known British music hall song, "My Old Man (Said Follow the Van)", in the line, "I walked behind wiv me old cock linnet..." referring to the linnet (Carduelis cannabina).

== Regulation ==
British finches are often associated with mules, a term used by cage bird breeders to refer to hybrids of finch species bred in captivity, such as that of a goldfinch and canary. There are now strict ringing regulations on British finches in places such as the UK, but they are still kept by aviculturists who care for them in much the same way as canaries. The seed mixture in the UK known as British Finch & Mule is their basic diet.

Since the Wildlife and Countryside Act 1981, it has been illegal to capture, attempt to capture or sell any British bird, and only those on Schedule 3 Part 1, may be sold if they are closed ringed and proof can be given that they were bred in captivity.

== Species ==
British finches are quite simply birds in the finch family which to this day live wild in the British Isles.

The species most popular include:

- Genus Fringilla - bramblings and chaffinches
  - Common chaffinch (Fringilla coelebs)
  - Brambling (Fringilla montifringilla) (Note: this species is often known in aviculture as the bramble finch)
- Subfamily Carduelinae - linnets, redpolls, goldfinches, greenfinches, some siskins
  - Greenfinch (Chloris chloris)
  - Redpoll (Acanthis flammea)
  - Siskin (Spinus spinus)
  - Goldfinch (Carduelis carduelis)
  - Twite (Linaria flavirostris)
  - Linnet (Linaria cannabina)
- Genus Loxia - crossbills
  - Common crossbill (Loxia species) (Note: In Victorian times the Scottish crossbill had not been identified)
- Genus Pyrrhula - bullfinches
  - Eurasian bullfinch (Pyrrhula pyrrhula)

== Mules and hybrids ==
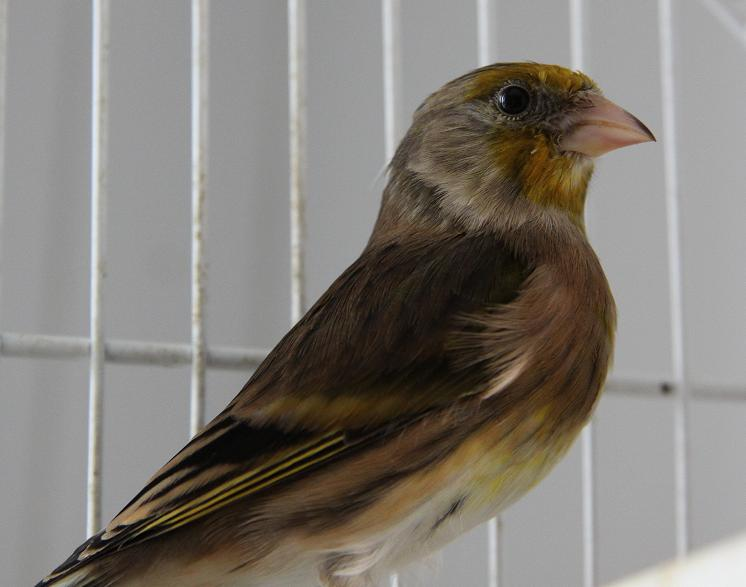
A hybrid between a European goldfinch and a domestic canary

During the Victorian era, it was found that if a British finch, e.g. a goldfinch, was crossed with a canary, the result was an attractive looking, good singing bird. The resulting birds were sterile, but continue to be bred to this day under the name of mules. Many clubs specialise in mules. Also around this time a few people began to experiment crossing British finches. The resulting birds, including siskin × goldfinch and even such beauties as crossbill × Eurasian bullfinch also remain to this day, often winning prizes at prestigious shows. The breeding of such hybrids can, however be notoriously difficult. When writing about hybrid pairs, the cock always comes first, e.g. greenfinch × goldfinch is a greenfinch cock over a goldfinch hen.

== See also ==
- List of birds of Great Britain
