= Mule Lake =

Lake in the state of Minnesota, United States

- Location within Minnesota
- Location: Cass County, Minnesota
- Coordinates: 46°54′51″N 94°16′5″W
- Type: lake

Mule Lake is a lake in Cass County, Minnesota, in the United States.

Mule Lake was named from the resemblance of its outline to a mule's head.

== See also ==
- List of lakes in Minnesota
