= Mule Peninsula =

Peninsula in Princess Elizabeth Land, Antarctica

Coordinates: 68°39′S 77°58′E

Mule Peninsula is an irregularly shaped rocky peninsula between Ellis Fjord and Krok Fjord in the southern part of the Vestfold Hills of Princess Elizabeth Land, Antarctica. It was mapped from aerial photographs taken by the Lars Christensen Expedition of 1936–37 and named Breidnesmulen ("broad point snout") by Norwegian cartographers. Mule Peninsula is an adaptation of the original Norwegian name by the Antarctic Names Committee of Australia.

== Marine Plain ==
A site on the peninsula known as Marine Plain, lying some 10 km south-east of Davis Station, is of exceptional scientific value because of its relevance to Antarctica's palaeoclimatic and palaeoecological record. Vertebrate fossil fauna found in the area includes Australodelphis mirus, a Pliocene dolphin that is the first cetacean fossil recovered from the Antarctic margin of the Southern Ocean that postdates the break-up of Gondwana. Other fossil cetaceans have also been found in the area, as well as a fish, a diverse invertebrate fauna that includes molluscs, gastropods, marine diatoms, and Antarctica's first Pliocene decapod crustacean. The site is protected under the Antarctic Treaty System as Antarctic Specially Protected Area (ASPA) No.143.
