= List of birds of Norway =

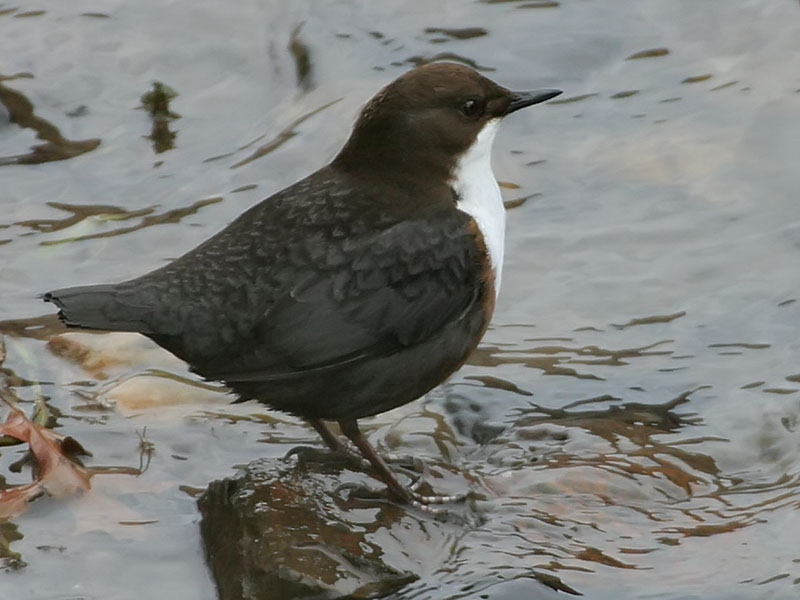
The white-throated dipper is the national bird of Norway.

This list of the bird species of Norway comprises all bird species that have been recorded in a wild state in Norway. It follows the official list of Birdlife Norge, formerly Norsk Ornitologisk Forening (NOF). Bird species admitted are those in categories A, B or C:

- A: species that have been recorded in an apparently natural state at least once since 1 January 1950.
- B: species that were recorded in an apparently natural state at least once between 1 January 1800 and 31 December 1949, but have not been recorded subsequently.
- C: species that, although originally introduced by humans, either deliberately or accidentally, have established breeding populations derived from introduced stock, which maintain themselves without necessary recourse to further introduction.

Categories D and E (not listed here) are used for record keeping only, and species in these categories are not included in the list:

- D: species that would otherwise appear in categories A or B except that there is reasonable doubt that they have ever occurred in a natural state.
- E: species that have been recorded as introductions, transportees, or escapees from captivity, and whose breeding populations (if any) are not believed to be self-sustaining.

This list's taxonomic treatment (designation and sequence of orders, families and species) and nomenclature (English and scientific names) are those of AviList, 2025 edition. The Norwegian (bokmål) names in parentheses are from the BirdLife Norge list.

The following tags have been used to highlight some categories of occurrence as noted by the NOF.

- (A) Accidental - a species that rarely or accidentally occurs in Norway
- (I) Introduced - a species introduced directly or indirectly to Norway and which has an established population
- (Ex) Extirpated - a species which no longer occurs in Norway, but other populations still exist elsewhere

== Ducks, geese, and waterfowl ==
Order: Anseriformes Family: Anatidae

Anatidae includes the ducks and most duck-like waterfowl, such as geese and swans. These birds are adapted to an aquatic existence with webbed feet, flattened bills, and feathers that are excellent at shedding water due to an oily coating.

- Ruddy duck (kobberand), Oxyura jamaicensis (I)
- Mute swan (knoppsvane), Cygnus olor
- Tundra swan (dvergsvane), Cygnus columbianus
- Whooper swan (sangsvane), Cygnus cygnus
- Brant (ringgås), Branta bernicla
- Red-breasted goose (rødhalsgås), Branta ruficollis (A) (vulnerable)
- Canada goose (kanadagås), Branta canadensis
- Barnacle goose (hvitkinngås), Branta leucopsis
- Cackling goose (polargås), Branta hutchinsii (A)
- Bar-headed goose (stripegås), Anser indicus (I)
- Ross's goose (eskimogås), Anser rossii (A)
- Snow goose (snøgås), Anser caerulescens (A)
- Graylag goose (grågås), Anser anser
- Lesser white-fronted goose (dverggås), Anser erythropus (vulnerable)
- Greater white-fronted goose (tundragås), Anser albifrons
- Tundra bean-goose (tundrasædgås), Anser serrirostris
- Pink-footed goose (kortnebbgås), Anser brachyrhynchus
- Taiga bean-goose (taigasædgås), Anser fabalis
- Mandarin duck (mandarinand), Aix galericulata (A) (I)
- Egyptian goose (niland), Alopochen aegyptiaca (A) (I)
- Common shelduck (gravand), Tadorna tadorna
- Ruddy shelduck (rustand), Tadorna ferruginea (A)
- Long-tailed duck (havelle), Clangula hyemalis
- Steller's eider (stellerand), Polysticta stelleri
- Spectacled eider (brilleærfugl), Somateria fischeri (A)
- King eider (praktærfugl), Somateria spectabilis
- Common eider (ærfugl), Somateria mollissima (near-threatened)
- Harlequin duck (harlekinand), Histrionicus histrionicus (A)
- Common scoter (svartand), Melanitta nigra
- Black scoter (amerikasvartand), Melanitta americana (A)
- Surf scoter (brilleand), Melanitta perspicillata (A)
- Velvet scoter (sjøorre), Melanitta fusca (vulnerable)
- Stejneger's scoter (sibirsjøorre), Melanitta stejnegeri (A)
- White-winged scoter (amerikasjøorre), Melanitta deglandi (A)
- Bufflehead (bøffeland), Bucephala albeola (A) (D)
- Barrow's goldeneye (islandsand), Bucephala islandica (A)
- Common goldeneye (kvinand), Bucephala clangula
- Smew (lappfiskand), Mergellus albellus
- Red-breasted merganser (siland), Mergus serrator
- Common merganser (laksand), Mergus merganser
- Red-crested pochard (rødhodeand), Netta rufina (A)
- Ferruginous duck (hvitøyeand), Aythya nyroca (A) (near-threatened)
- Common pochard (taffeland), Aythya ferina (vulnerable)
- Ring-necked duck (ringand), Aythya collaris (A)
- Tufted duck (toppand), Aythya fuligula
- Lesser scaup (purpurhodeand), Aythya affinis (A)
- Greater scaup (bergand), Aythya marila
- Baikal teal (gulkinnand), Sibirionetta formosa (A)
- Garganey (knekkand), Spatula querquedula
- Blue-winged teal (blåvingeand), Spatula discors (A)
- Northern shoveler (skjeand), Spatula clypeata
- Gadwall (snadderand), Mareca strepera
- Eurasian wigeon (brunnakke), Mareca penelope
- American wigeon (amerikablesand), Mareca americana (A)
- Mallard (stokkand), Anas platyrhynchos
- American black duck (rødfotand), Anas rubripes (A)
- Northern pintail (stjertand), Anas acuta
- Green-winged teal (krikkand), Anas crecca

== Pheasants, grouse, and allies ==
Order: Galliformes Family: Phasianidae

These are terrestrial species of gamebirds, feeding and nesting on the ground. They are variable in size but generally plump, with broad and relatively short wings.

- Hazel grouse (jerpe), Tetrastes bonasia
- Rock ptarmigan (fjellrype), Lagopus muta
- Willow ptarmigan (lirype), Lagopus lagopus
- Western capercaillie (storfugl), Tetrao urogallus
- Black grouse (orrfugl), Lyrurus tetrix
- Gray partridge (rapphøne), Perdix perdix (Ex)
- Common quail (vaktel), Coturnix coturnix

== Grebes ==
Order: Podicipediformes Family: Podicipedidae

Grebes are small to medium-large freshwater diving birds. They have lobed toes and are excellent swimmers and divers. However, they have their feet placed far back on the body, making them quite ungainly on land.

- Little grebe (dvergdykker), Tachybaptus ruficollis
- Pied-billed grebe (ringnebbdykker), Podilymbus podiceps (A)
- Horned grebe (horndykker), Podiceps auritus (vulnerable)
- Red-necked grebe (gråstrupedykker), Podiceps grisegena
- Great crested grebe (toppdykker), Podiceps cristatus
- Eared grebe (svarthalsdykker), Podiceps nigricollis (A)

== Bustards ==
Order: Otidiformes Family: Otididae

Bustards are large terrestrial birds mainly associated with dry open country and steppes in the Old World. They are omnivorous and nest on the ground. They walk steadily on strong legs and big toes, pecking for food as they go. They have long broad wings with "fingered" wingtips and striking patterns in flight. Many have interesting mating displays.

- Great bustard (stortrappe), Otis tarda (A)
- Little bustard (dvergtrappe), Tetrax tetrax (A)

== Cuckoos ==
Order: Cuculiformes Family: Cuculidae

The family Cuculidae includes cuckoos, roadrunners, and anis. These birds are of variable size with slender bodies, long tails, and strong legs. The Old World cuckoos are brood parasites.

- Great spotted cuckoo (skjæregjøk), Clamator glandarius (A)
- Yellow-billed cuckoo (gulnebbgjøk), Coccyzus americanus (A)
- Common cuckoo (gjøk), Cuculus canorus

== Sandgrouse ==
Order: Pterocliformes Family: Pteroclidae

Sandgrouse have small pigeon-like heads and necks, but sturdy compact bodies. They have long pointed wings and sometimes tails and a fast direct flight. Flocks fly to watering holes at dawn and dusk. Their legs are feathered down to the toes.

- Pallas's sandgrouse (steppehøne), Syrrhaptes paradoxus (A)

== Pigeons and doves ==
Order: Columbiformes Family: Columbidae

Pigeons and doves are stout-bodied birds with short necks and short slender bills with a fleshy cere.

- Oriental turtle-dove (mongolturteldue), Streptopelia orientalis (A)
- European turtle-dove (turteldue), Streptopelia turtur (vulnerable)
- Eurasian collared-dove (tyrkerdue), Streptopelia decaocto
- Common wood-pigeon (ringdue), Columba palumbus
- Rock pigeon (bydue), Columba livia (I)
- Stock dove (skogdue), Columba oenas

== Cranes ==
Order: Gruiformes Family: Gruidae

Cranes are large, long-legged, and long-necked birds. Unlike the similar-looking but unrelated herons, cranes fly with necks outstretched, not pulled back. Most have elaborate and noisy courting displays or "dances".

- Sandhill crane (kanadatrane), Antigone canadensis (A)
- Demoiselle crane (jomfrutrane), Grus virgo (A)
- Common crane (trane), Grus grus

== Rails, gallinules, and coots ==
Order: Gruiformes Family: Rallidae

Rallidae is a large family of small to medium-sized birds which includes the rails, crakes, coots, and gallinules. Typically they inhabit dense vegetation in damp environments near lakes, swamps, or rivers. In general they are shy and secretive birds, making them difficult to observe. Most species have strong legs and long toes which are well adapted to soft uneven surfaces. They tend to have short, rounded wings and to be weak fliers.

- Water rail (vannrikse), Rallus aquaticus
- Corn crake (åkerrikse), Crex crex
- Sora (maskerikse), Porzana carolina (A)
- Spotted crake (myrrikse), Porzana porzana
- Eurasian moorhen (sivhøne), Gallinula chloropus
- Eurasian coot (sothøne), Fulica atra
- Little crake (sumprikse), Zapornia parva (A)

== Thick-knees ==
Order: Charadriiformes Family: Burhinidae

The thick-knees are a group of waders found worldwide within the tropical zone, with some species also breeding in temperate Europe and Australia. They are medium to large waders with strong black or yellow-black bills, large yellow eyes, and cryptic plumage. Despite being classed as waders, most species have a preference for arid or semi-arid habitats.

- Eurasian thick-knee (triel), Burhinus oedicnemus (A)

== Stilts and avocets ==
Order: Charadriiformes Family: Recurvirostridae

Recurvirostridae is a family of large wading birds which includes the avocets and stilts. The avocets have long legs and long up-curved bills. The stilts have extremely long legs and long, thin, straight bills.

- Pied avocet (avosett), Recurvirostra avosetta
- Black-winged stilt (stylteløper), Himantopus himantopus (A)

== Oystercatchers ==
Order: Charadriiformes Family: Haematopodidae

The oystercatchers are large and noisy plover-like birds, with strong bills used for smashing or prising open molluscs.

- Eurasian oystercatcher (tjeld), Haematopus ostralegus

== Plovers and lapwings ==
Order: Charadriiformes Family: Charadriidae

The family Charadriidae includes the plovers, dotterels, and lapwings. They are small to medium-sized birds with compact bodies, short thick necks, and long, usually pointed, wings. They are found in open country worldwide, mostly in habitats near water.

- Black-bellied plover (tundralo), Pluvialis squatarola
- European golden-plover (heilo), Pluvialis apricaria
- American golden-plover (kanadalo), Pluvialis dominica (A)
- Pacific golden-plover (sibirlo), Pluvialis fulva (A)
- Eurasian dotterel (boltit), Eudromias morinellus
- Killdeer (tobeltelo), Charadrius vociferus (A)
- Common ringed plover (sandlo), Charadrius hiaticula (A)
- Semipalmated plover (amerikasandlo), Charadrius semipalmatus (A)
- Little ringed plover (dverglo), Thinornis dubius
- Northern lapwing (vipe), Vanellus vanellus
- Gray-headed lapwing (gråhodevipe), Vanellus cinereus (A)
- White-tailed lapwing (sumpvipe), Vanellus leucurus (A)
- Caspian plover (rødbrystlo), Charadrius asiaticus (A)
- Oriental plover (steppelo), Charadrius veredus (A)
- Tibetan sand plover (tibetlo), Charadrius mongolus (A)
- Siberian sand plover (kamtsjatkalo), Charadrius mongolus (A)
- Greater sand plover (ørkenlo), Charadrius leschenaultii (A)
- Kentish plover (hvitbrystlo), Charadrius alexandrinus (A)

== Sandpipers and allies ==
Order: Charadriiformes Family: Scolopacidae

Scolopacidae is a large diverse family of small to medium-sized shorebirds including the sandpipers, curlews, godwits, shanks, tattlers, woodcocks, snipes, dowitchers, and phalaropes. The majority of these species eat small invertebrates picked out of the mud or soil. Variation in length of legs and bills enables multiple species to feed in the same habitat, particularly on the coast, without direct competition for food.

- Upland sandpiper (præriesnipe), Bartramia longicauda (A)
- Little curlew (dvergspove), Numenius minutus (A)
- Hudsonian whimbrel (tundraspove), Numenius hudsonicus (A)
- Eurasian whimbrel (småspove), Numenius phaeopus
- Eurasian curlew (storspove), Numenius arquata
- Bar-tailed godwit (lappspove), Limosa lapponica
- Black-tailed godwit (svarthalespove), Limosa limosa
- Hudsonian godwit (svartvingespove), Limosa haemastica (A)
- Long-billed dowitcher (langnebbekkasinsnipe), Limnodromus scolopaceus (A)
- Short-billed dowitcher (kortnebbekkasinsnipe), Limnodromus griseus (A)
- Jack snipe (kvartbekkasin), Lymnocryptes minimus
- Eurasian woodcock (rugde), Scolopax rusticola
- Great snipe (dobbeltbekkasin), Gallinago media
- Common snipe (enkeltbekkasin), Gallinago gallinago
- Wilson's snipe, Gallinago delicata (A)
- Terek sandpiper (tereksnipe), Xenus cinereus (A)
- Common sandpiper (strandsnipe), Actitis hypoleucos
- Spotted sandpiper (flekksnipe), Actitis macularia (A)
- Wilson's phalarope (hvithalesvømmesnipe), Phalaropus tricolor (A)
- Red phalarope (polarsvømmesnipe), Phalaropus fulicarius
- Red-necked phalarope (svømmesnipe), Phalaropus lobatus
- Green sandpiper (skogsnipe), Tringa ochropus
- Solitary sandpiper (eremittsnipe), Tringa solitaria (A)
- Marsh sandpiper (damsnipe), Tringa stagnatilis (A)
- Wood sandpiper (grønnstilk), Tringa glareola
- Common redshank (rødstilk), Tringa totanus
- Lesser yellowlegs (gulbeinsnipe), Tringa flavipes (A)
- Willet (willetsnipe), Tringa semipalmata (A)
- Spotted redshank (sotsnipe), Tringa erythropus
- Common greenshank (gluttsnipe), Tringa nebularia
- Greater yellowlegs (plystresnipe), Tringa melanoleuca (A)
- Ruddy turnstone (steinvender), Arenaria interpres
- Red knot (polarsnipe), Calidris canutus
- Great knot (polarsnipe), Calidris tenuirostris (A)
- Ruff (brushane), Calidris pugnax
- Sharp-tailed sandpiper (spisshalesnipe), Calidris acuminata (A)
- Broad-billed sandpiper (fjellmyrløper), Calidris falcinellus
- Curlew sandpiper (tundrasnipe), Calidris ferruginea
- Stilt sandpiper (styltesnipe), Calidris himantopus (A)
- Red-necked stint (rødstrupesnipe), Calidris ruficollis (A)
- Temminck's stint (temmincksnipe), Calidris temminckii
- Long-toed stint (langtåsnipe), Calidris subminuta (A)
- Buff-breasted sandpiper (rustsnipe), Calidris subruficollis (A)
- Sanderling (sandløper), Calidris alba
- Dunlin (myrsnipe), Calidris alpina
- Purple sandpiper (fjæreplytt), Calidris maritima
- Baird's sandpiper (gulbrystsnipe), Calidris bairdii (A)
- Pectoral sandpiper (alaskasnipe), Calidris melanotos (A)
- Semipalmated sandpiper (sandsnipe), Calidris pusilla (A)
- Western sandpiper (beringsnipe), Calidris mauri (A)
- Little stint (dvergsnipe), Calidris minuta
- White-rumped sandpiper (bonapartesnipe), Calidris fuscicollis (A)

== Pratincoles and coursers ==
Order: Charadriiformes Family: Glareolidae

Glareolidae is a family of wading birds comprising the pratincoles, which have short legs, long pointed wings, and long forked tails, and the coursers, which have long legs, short wings, and long, pointed bills which curve downwards.

- Cream-colored courser (ørkenløper), Cursorius cursor (A)
- Oriental pratincole (orientbrakksvale), Glareola maldivarum (A)
- Black-winged pratincole (steppebrakksvale), Glareola nordmanni (A)
- Collared pratincole (brakksvale), Glareola pratincola (A)

== Skuas and jaegers ==
Order: Charadriiformes Family: Stercorariidae

The family Stercorariidae are, in general, medium to large sea birds, typically with gray or brown plumage, often with white markings on the wings. They nest on the ground in temperate and arctic regions and are long-distance migrants.

- Parasitic jaeger (tyvjo), Stercorarius parasiticus
- Long-tailed jaeger (fjelljo), Stercorarius longicaudus
- Pomarine jaeger (polarjo), Stercorarius pomarinus
- Great skua (storjo), Stercorarius skua

== Auks, murres, and puffins ==
Order: Charadriiformes Family: Alcidae

Alcidae are a family of seabirds which are superficially similar to penguins with their black-and-white colors, their upright posture, and some of their habits, but which are able to fly.

- Tufted puffin (topplunde), Fratercula cirrhata (A)
- Atlantic puffin (lunde), Fratercula arctica
- Horned puffin, Fratercula corniculata (A)
- Black guillemot (teist), Cepphus grylle
- Razorbill (alke), Alca torda
- Little auk (alkekonge), Alle alle
- Thick-billed murre (polarlomvi), Uria lomvia
- Common murre (lomvi), Uria aalge

== Gulls, terns, and skimmers ==
Order: Charadriiformes Family: Laridae

Laridae is a family of medium to large seabirds and includes gulls, terns, and skimmers. Gulls are typically gray or white, often with black markings on the head or wings. They have stout, longish, bills and webbed feet. Terns are a group of generally medium to large seabirds typically with gray or white plumage, often with black markings on the head. Most terns hunt fish by diving but some pick insects off the surface of fresh water. Terns are generally long-lived birds, with several species known to live in excess of 30 years.

- Bridled tern (tøyleterne), Onychoprion anaethetus (A)
- Little tern (dvergterne), Sternula albifrons (A)
- Caspian tern (rovterne), Hydroprogne caspia
- Gull-billed tern (sandterne), Gelochelidon nilotica (A)
- Whiskered tern (hvitkinnsvartterne), Chlidonias hybrida (A)
- White-winged tern (hvitvingesvartterne), Chlidonias leucopterus (A)
- Sandwich tern (splitterne), Thalasseus sandvicensis
- Royal tern/West African crested tern (konge-/høvdingterne), Thalasseus maximus/albididorsalis (A)
- Black tern (svartterne), Chlidonias niger
- Common tern (makrellterne), Sterna hirundo
- Arctic tern (rødnebbterne), Sterna paradisaea
- Roseate tern (rosenterne), Sterna dougallii (A)
- Little gull (dvergmåke), Hydrocoloeus minutus
- Ross's gull (rosenmåke), Rhodostethia rosea (A)
- Black-legged kittiwake (krykkje), Rissa tridactyla
- Sabine's gull (sabinemåke), Xema sabini
- Ivory gull (ismåke), Pagophila eburnea (A)
- Bonaparte's gull (kanadahettemåke), Chroicocephalus philadelphia (A)
- Black-headed gull (hettemåke), Chroicocephalus ridibundus
- Laughing gull (lattermåke), Leucophaeus atricilla (A)
- Franklin's gull (franklinmåke), Leucophaeus pipixcan (A)
- Pallas's gull (steppemåke), Ichthyaetus ichthyaetus (A)
- Mediterranean gull (svartehavsmåke), Ichthyaetus melanocephalus
- Ring-billed gull (ringnebbmåke), Larus delawarensis (A)
- Common gull (fiskemåke), Larus canus
- Caspian gull (kaspimåke), Larus cachinnans (A)
- American herring gull (amerikagråmåke), Larus smithsonianus (A)
- European herring gull (gråmåke), Larus argentatus
- Yellow-legged gull (gulbeinmåke), Larus michahellis (A)
- Great black-backed gull (svartbak), Larus marinus
- Glaucous gull (polarmåke), Larus hyperboreus
- Lesser black-backed gull (sildemåke), Larus fuscus
- Glaucous-winged gull (gråvingemåke), Larus glaucescens (A)
- Iceland gull (grønlandsmåke), Larus glaucoides

== Loons ==
Order: Gaviiformes Family: Gaviidae

Loons are a group of aquatic birds found in many parts of North America and Northern Europe. They are the size of a large duck or small goose, which they somewhat resemble in shape when swimming, but to which they are completely unrelated. In particular, loons' legs are set very far back which assists swimming underwater but makes walking on land extremely difficult.

- Red-throated loon (smålom), Gavia stellata
- Common loon (islom), Gavia immer
- Yellow-billed loon (gulnebblom), Gavia adamsii
- Pacific loon (amerikastorlom), Gavia pacifica (A)
- Arctic loon (storlom), Gavia arctica

== Albatrosses ==
Order: Procellariiformes Family: Diomedeidae

The albatrosses are among the largest of flying birds, and the great albatrosses of the genus Diomedea have the largest wingspans of any extant birds.

- Yellow-nosed albatross (gulnesealbatross), Thalassarche chlororhynchos (A)
- Black-browed albatross (svartbrynalbatross), Thalassarche melanophris (A)

== Southern storm-petrels ==
Order: Procellariiformes Family: Oceanitidae

The southern storm-petrels are relatives of the petrels and are the smallest seabirds. They feed on planktonic crustaceans and small fish picked from the surface, typically while hovering.

- Wilson's storm-petrel (oseanstormsvale), Oceanites oceanicus (A)

== Northern storm-petrels ==
Order: Procellariiformes Family: Hydrobatidae

Though the members of this family are similar in many respects to the southern storm-petrels, including their general appearance and habits, there are enough genetic differences to warrant their placement in a separate family.

- European storm-petrel (havsvale), Hydrobates pelagicus
- Swinhoe's storm-petrel (japanstormsvale), Hydrobates monorhis (A)
- Leach's storm-petrel (stormsvale), Hydrobates leucorhous

== Shearwaters and petrels ==
Order: Procellariiformes Family: Procellariidae

The procellariids are the main group of medium-sized "true petrels", characterized by united nostrils with medium septum and a long outer functional primary.

- Cape petrel (flekkpetrell), Daption capense (A)
- Northern fulmar (havhest), Fulmarus glacialis
- Scopoli's shearwater/Cory's shearwater (poseidon-/portugiserlire), Calonectris diomedea/borealis (A)
- Sooty shearwater (grålire), Ardenna griseus
- Great shearwater (storlire), Ardenna gravis (A)
- Manx shearwater (havlire), Puffinus puffinus
- Yelkouan shearwater (middelhavslire), Puffinus yelkouan (A)
- Soft-plumaged petrel, (silkepetrell), Pterodroma mollis (A)
- Zino's petrel/Fea's petrel/Desertas petrel (madeira-/kappverde-/desertaspetrell), Pterodroma madeira/feae/deserta (A)

== Storks ==
Order: Ciconiiformes Family: Ciconiidae

Storks are large, long-legged, long-necked, wading birds with long, stout bills. Storks are mute, but bill-clattering is an important mode of communication at the nest. Their nests can be large and may be reused for many years. Many species are migratory.

- Black stork (svartstork), Ciconia nigra (A)
- White stork (stork), Ciconia ciconia (A)

== Boobies and gannets ==
Order: Suliformes Family: Sulidae

The sulids comprise the gannets and boobies. Both groups are medium-large coastal seabirds that plunge-dive for fish.

- Northern gannet (havsule), Morus bassanus
- Brown booby (brunsule), Sula leucogaster

== Cormorants and shags ==
Order: Suliformes Family: Phalacrocoracidae

Cormorants and shags are medium-to-large aquatic birds, usually with mainly dark plumage and areas of colored skin on the face. The bill is long, thin and sharply hooked. Their feet are four-toed and webbed.

- European shag (toppskarv), Gulosus aristotelis
- Great cormorant (storskarv), Phalacrocorax carbo

== Ibises and spoonbills ==
Order: Pelecaniformes Family: Threskiornithidae

The family Threskiornithidae includes the ibises and spoonbills. They have long, broad wings. Their bodies tend to be elongated, the neck more so, with rather long legs. The bill is also long, decurved in the case of the ibises, straight and distinctively flattened in the spoonbills.

- Glossy ibis (bronseibis), Plegadis falcinellus (A)
- Eurasian spoonbill (skjestork), Platalea leucorodia (A)

== Herons, egrets, and bitterns ==
Order: Pelecaniformes Family: Ardeidae

The family Ardeidae contains the herons, egrets, and bitterns. Herons and egrets are medium to large wading birds with long necks and legs. Bitterns tend to be shorter necked and more secretive. Members of Ardeidae fly with their necks retracted, unlike other long-necked birds such as storks, ibises and spoonbills.

- Great bittern (rørdrum), Botaurus stellaris
- American bittern (amerikarørdrum), Botaurus lentiginosus (A)
- Little bittern (dvergrørdrum), Botaurus minutus (A)
- Little egret (silkehegre), Egretta garzetta
- Black-crowned night-heron (natthegre), Nycticorax nycticorax (A)
- Squacco heron (topphegre), Ardeola ralloides (A)
- Great egret (egretthegre), Ardea alba
- Cattle egret (kuhegre), Bubulcus ibis (A)
- Purple heron (purpurhegre), Ardea purpurea (A)
- Gray heron (gråhegre), Ardea cinerea

== Nightjars and allies ==
Order: Caprimulgiformes Family: Caprimulgidae

Nightjars are medium-sized nocturnal birds that usually nest on the ground. They have long wings, short legs, and very short bills. Most have small feet, of little use for walking, and long pointed wings. Their soft plumage is camouflaged to resemble bark or leaves.

- Eurasian nightjar (nattravn), Caprimulgus europaeus

== Swifts ==
Order: Caprimulgiformes Family: Apodidae

Swifts are small birds which spend the majority of their lives flying. These birds have very short legs and never settle voluntarily on the ground, perching instead only on vertical surfaces. Many swifts have long swept-back wings which resemble a crescent or boomerang.

- White-throated needletail (pigghaleseiler), Hirundapus caudacutus (A)
- Alpine swift (alpeseiler), Tachymarptis melba (A)
- Common swift (tårnseiler), Apus apus
- Pallid swift (gråseiler), Apus pallidus (A)

== Barn-owls ==
Order: Strigiformes Family: Tytonidae

Barn-owls are medium to large owls with large heads and characteristic heart-shaped faces. They have long strong legs with powerful talons.

- Barn owl (tårnugle), Tyto alba (A)

== Owls ==
Order: Strigiformes Family: Strigidae

Typical owls are small to large solitary nocturnal birds of prey. They have large forward-facing eyes and ears, a hawk-like beak, and a conspicuous circle of feathers around each eye called a facial disk.

- Boreal owl (perleugle), Aegolius funereus
- Northern hawk owl (haukugle), Surnia ulula
- Eurasian pygmy owl (spurveugle), Glaucidium passerinum
- Eurasian scops owl (dverghornugle), Otus scops (A)
- Short-eared owl (jordugle), Asio flammeus
- Long-eared owl (hornugle), Asio otus
- Snowy owl (snøugle), Bubo scandiacus
- Eurasian eagle-owl (hubro), Bubo bubo
- Tawny owl (kattugle), Strix aluco
- Ural owl (slagugle), Strix uralensis
- Great gray owl (lappugle), Strix nebulosa

== Osprey ==
Order: Accipitriformes Family: Pandionidae

Pandionidae is a family of fish-eating birds of prey, possessing a very large, powerful hooked beak for tearing flesh from their prey, strong legs, powerful talons, and keen eyesight. The family is monotypic.

- Osprey (fiskeørn), Pandion haliaetus

== Hawks, eagles and kites ==
Order: Accipitriformes Family: Accipitridae

Accipitridae is a family of birds of prey and includes hawks, eagles, kites, harriers, and Old World vultures. These birds have very large powerful hooked beaks for tearing flesh from their prey, strong legs, powerful talons, and keen eyesight.

- Black-winged kite (svartvingeglente), Neophron percnopterus (A)
- Egyptian vulture (åtselgribb), Neophron percnopterus (A) (endangered)
- European honey-buzzard (vepsevåk), Pernis apivorus
- Cinereous vulture (munkegribb), Aegypius monachus (A)
- Himalayan vulture (himalayagribb), Gyps himalayensis (A)
- Eurasian griffon (gåsegribb), Gyps fulvus (A)
- Short-toed snake-eagle (slangeørn), Circaetus gallicus (A)
- Booted eagle (dvergørn), Hieraaetus pennatus (A)
- Lesser spotted eagle (småskrikørn), Clanga pomarina (A)
- Greater spotted eagle (storskrikørn), Clanga clanga (A) (vulnerable)
- Steppe eagle (steppeørn), Aquila nipalensis (A)
- Imperial eagle (keiserørn), Aquila heliaca (A)
- Golden eagle (kongeørn), Aquila chrysaetos
- Eurasian sparrowhawk (spurvehauk), Accipiter nisus
- Eurasian goshawk (hønsehauk), Astur gentilis
- Pallid harrier (steppehauk), Circus macrourus
- Hen harrier (myrhauk), Circus cyaneus
- Northern harrier (mørkmyrhauk), Circus hudsonius (A)
- Montagu's harrier (enghauk), Circus pygargus (A)
- Eurasian marsh-harrier (sivhauk), Circus aeruginosus
- Red kite (rødglente), Milvus milvus
- Black kite (svartglente), Milvus migrans
- Pallas's fish eagle (båndhavørn), Haliaeetus leucoryphus (A) (endangered)
- White-tailed eagle (havørn), Haliaeetus albicilla
- Rough-legged hawk (fjellvåk), Buteo lagopus
- Common buzzard (musvåk), Buteo buteo
- Long-legged buzzard (ørnvåk), Buteo rufinus (A)

== Hoopoes ==
Order: Bucerotiformes Family: Upupidae

Hoopoes have black, white and orangey-pink coloring with a large erectile crest on their head.

- Common hoopoe (hærfugl), Upupa epops

== Rollers ==
Order: Coraciiformes Family: Coraciidae

Rollers resemble crows in size and build, but are more closely related to the kingfishers and bee-eaters. They share the colourful appearance of those groups with blues and browns predominating. The two inner front toes are connected, but the outer toe is not.

- European roller (blåråke), Coracias garrulus (A)

== Bee-eaters ==
Order: Coraciiformes Family: Meropidae

The bee-eaters are a group of coraciiform birds in the family Meropidae. Most species are found in Africa but others occur in southern Europe, Madagascar, Australia and New Guinea. They are characterized by richly colored plumage, slender bodies and usually elongated central tail feathers. All are colourful and have long downturned bills and pointed wings, which give them a swallow-like appearance when seen from afar.

- European bee-eater (bieter), Merops apiaster
- Blue-cheeked bee-eater (blåkinnbieter), Merops persicus (A)

== Kingfishers ==
Order: Coraciiformes Family: Alcedinidae

Kingfishers are medium-sized birds with large heads, long, pointed bills, short legs and stubby tails.

- Common kingfisher (isfugl), Alcedo atthis

== Woodpeckers ==
Order: Piciformes Family: Picidae

Woodpeckers are small to medium-sized birds with chisel-like beaks, short legs, stiff tails and long tongues used for capturing insects. Some species have feet with two toes pointing forward and two backward, while several species have only three toes. Many woodpeckers have the habit of tapping noisily on tree trunks with their beaks.

- Eurasian wryneck (vendehals), Jynx torquilla
- European green woodpecker (grønnspett), Picus viridis
- Grey-headed woodpecker (gråspett), Picus canus
- Black woodpecker (svartspett), Dryocopus martius
- Eurasian three-toed woodpecker (tretåspett), Picoides tridactylus
- Middle spotted woodpecker (mellomspett), Dendrocoptes medius
- White-backed woodpecker (hvitryggspett), Dendrocopos leucotos
- Great spotted woodpecker (flaggspett), Dendrocopos major
- Lesser spotted woodpecker (dvergspett), Dryobates minor

== Falcons and caracaras ==
Order: Falconiformes Family: Falconidae

Falconidae is a family of diurnal birds of prey. They differ from hawks, eagles and kites in that they kill with their beaks instead of their talons.

- Lesser kestrel (rødfalk), Falco naumanni (A)
- Eurasian kestrel (tårnfalk), Falco tinnunculus
- Red-footed falcon (aftenfalk), Falco vespertinus (A)
- Merlin (dvergfalk), Falco columbarius
- Eurasian hobby (lerkefalk), Falco subbuteo
- Peregrine falcon (vandrefalk), Falco peregrinus
- Gyrfalcon (jaktfalk), Falco rusticolus

== Tyrant flycatchers ==
Order: Passeriformes Family: Tyrannidae

Tyrant flycatchers are Passerine birds which occur throughout North and South America. They superficially resemble the Old World flycatchers, but are more robust and have stronger bills. They do not have the sophisticated vocal capabilities of the songbirds. Most, but not all, are rather plain. As the name implies, most are insectivorous.

- Alder flycatcher (oreempid), Empidonax alnorum (A)

== Vireos, shrike-babblers, and erpornis ==
Order: Passeriformes Family: Vireonidae

The vireos are a group of small to medium-sized passerine birds. They are typically greenish in color and resemble wood warblers apart from their heavier bills.

- Red-eyed vireo (rødøyevireo), Vireo olivaceus (A)

== Old World orioles ==
Order: Passeriformes Family: Oriolidae

The Old World orioles are colourful passerine birds. They are not related to the New World orioles.

- Eurasian golden oriole (pirol), Oriolus oriolus

== Shrikes ==
Order: Passeriformes Family: Laniidae

Shrikes are passerine birds known for their habit of catching other birds and small animals and impaling the uneaten portions of their bodies on thorns. A shrike's beak is hooked, like that of a typical bird of prey.

- Great gray shrike (varsler), Lanius excubitor
- Northern shrike (borealvarsler), Lanius borealis (A)
- Masked shrike (hvitpannevarsler), Lanius nubicus (A)
- Lesser gray shrike (rosenvarsler), Lanius minor (A)
- Woodchat shrike (rødhodevarsler), Lanius senator (A)
- Isabelline shrike (isabellavarsler), Lanius isabellinus (A)
- Red-backed shrike (tornskate), Lanius collurio
- Red-tailed shrike (rødhalevarsler, Lanius phoenicuroides (A)
- Brown shrike (brunvarsler), Lanius cristatus (A)

== Crows, jays, and magpies ==
Order: Passeriformes Family: Corvidae

The family Corvidae includes crows, ravens, jays, choughs, magpies, treepies, nutcrackers, and ground jays. Corvids are above average in size among the Passeriformes, and some of the larger species show high levels of intelligence.

- Siberian jay (lavskrike), Perisoreus infaustus
- Eurasian jay (nøtteskrike), Garrulus glandarius
- Eurasian magpie (skjære), Pica pica
- Eurasian nutcracker (nøttekråke), Nucifraga caryocatactes
- Eurasian jackdaw (kaie), Coloeus monedula
- Rook (kornkråke), Corvus frugilegus
- Hooded crow (kråke), Corvus cornix
- Common raven (ravn), Corvus corax

== Penduline-tits ==
Order: Passeriformes Family: Remizidae

The penduline-tits are a group of small passerine birds related to the true tits. They are insectivores.

- Eurasian penduline-tit (pungmeis), Remiz pendulinus (A)

== Tits, chickadees, and titmice ==
Order: Passeriformes Family: Paridae

The Paridae are mainly small stocky woodland species with short stout bills. Some have crests. They are adaptable birds, with a mixed diet including seeds and insects.

- Eurasian blue tit (blåmeis), Cyanistes caeruleus
- Great tit (kjøttmeis), Parus major
- Coal tit (svartmeis), Periparus ater
- Crested tit (toppmeis), Lophophanes cristatus
- Marsh tit (løvmeis), Poecile palustris
- Willow tit (granmeis), Poecile montana
- Gray-headed chickadee (lappmeis), Poecile cincta

== Bearded reedling ==
Order: Passeriformes Family: Panuridae

This species, the only one in its family, is found in reed beds throughout temperate Europe and Asia.

- Bearded reedling (skjeggmeis), Panurus biarmicus

== Larks ==
Order: Passeriformes Family: Alaudidae

Larks are small terrestrial birds with often extravagant songs and display flights. Most larks are fairly dull in appearance. Their food is insects and seeds.

- Wood lark (trelerke), Lullula arborea
- White-winged lark (hvitvingelerke), Alauda leucoptera (A)
- Eurasian skylark (sanglerke), Alauda arvensis
- Crested lark (topplerke), Galerida cristata (A)
- Horned lark (fjellerke), Eremophila alpestris
- Greater short-toed lark (dverglerke), Calandrella brachydactyla (A)
- Bimaculated lark (fjellkalanderlerke), Melanocorypha bimaculata (A)
- Calandra lark (kalanderlerke), Melanocorypha calandra (A)
- Turkestan short-toed lark (turkestandverglerke), Alaudala heinei (A)

== Reed warblers and allies ==
Order: Passeriformes Family: Acrocephalidae

The members of this family are usually rather large for "warblers". Most are rather plain olivaceous brown above with much yellow to beige below. They are usually found in open woodland, reedbeds, or tall grass. The family occurs mostly in southern to western Eurasia and surroundings, but it also ranges far into the Pacific, with some species in Africa.

- Icterine warbler (gulsanger), Hippolais icterina
- Melodious warbler (spottesanger), Hippolais polyglotta (A)
- Thick-billed warbler (tykknebbsanger), Arundinax aedon (A)
- Booted warbler (tartarsanger), Iduna caligata (A)
- Sykes's warbler (ramasanger), Iduna rama (A)
- Eastern olivaceous warbler (bleksanger), Iduna pallida (A)
- Sedge warbler (sivsanger), Acrocephalus schoenobaenus
- Aquatic warbler (vannsanger), Acrocephalus paludicola (A)
- Paddyfield warbler (åkersanger), Acrocephalus agricola (A)
- Blyth's reed warbler (busksanger), Acrocephalus dumetorum
- Marsh warbler (myrsanger), Acrocephalus palustris
- Eurasian reed warbler (rørsanger), Acrocephalus scirpaceus
- Great reed warbler (trostesanger), Acrocephalus arundinaceus (A)

== Grassbirds and allies ==
Order: Passeriformes Family: Locustellidae

Locustellidae are a family of small insectivorous songbirds found mainly in Eurasia, Africa, and the Australian region. They are smallish birds with tails that are usually long and pointed, and tend to be drab brownish or buffy all over.

- Pallas's grasshopper warbler (starrsanger), Helopsaltes certhiola (A)
- Lanceolated warbler (stripesanger), Locustella lanceolata (A)
- River warbler (elvesanger), Locustella fluviatilis
- Savi's warbler (sumpsanger), Locustella luscinioides (A)
- Common grasshopper-warbler (gresshoppesanger), Locustella naevia

== Swallows ==
Order: Passeriformes Family: Hirundinidae

The family Hirundinidae is adapted to aerial feeding. They have a slender streamlined body, long pointed wings, and a short bill with a wide gape. The feet are adapted to perching rather than walking, and the front toes are partially joined at the base.

- Bank swallow (sandsvale), Riparia riparia
- Eurasian crag-martin (klippesvale), Ptyonoprogne rupestris (A)
- Barn swallow (låvesvale), Hirundo rustica
- Common house-martin (taksvale), Delichon urbicum
- European red-rumped swallow (brosvale), Cecropis rufula (A)
- Eastern red-rumped swallow (tempelsvale), Cecropis daurica (A)

== Long-tailed tits ==
Order: Passeriformes Family: Aegithalidae

Long-tailed tits are a group of small passerine birds with medium to long tails. They make woven bag nests in trees. Most eat a mixed diet which includes insects.

- Long-tailed tit (stjertmeis), Aegithalos caudatus

== Leaf warblers ==
Order: Passeriformes Family: Phylloscopidae

Leaf warblers are a family of small insectivorous birds found mostly in Eurasia and ranging into Wallacea and Africa. The species are of various sizes, often green-plumaged above and yellow below, or more subdued with grayish-green to grayish-brown colors.

- Wood warbler (bøksanger), Phylloscopus sibilatrix
- Western Bonelli's warbler (eikesanger), Phylloscopus bonelli (A)
- Eastern Bonelli's warbler (furusanger), Phylloscopus orientalis (A)
- Yellow-browed warbler (gulbrynsanger), Phylloscopus inornatus
- Hume's warbler (blekbrynsanger), Phylloscopus humei (A)
- Pallas's leaf warbler (fuglekongesanger), Phylloscopus proregulus (A)
- Radde's warbler (viersanger), Phylloscopus schwarzi (A)
- Dusky warbler (brunsanger), Phylloscopus fuscatus (A)
- Willow warbler (løvsanger), Phylloscopus trochilus
- Common chiffchaff (gransanger), Phylloscopus collybita
- Eastern crowned warbler (østkronsanger), Phylloscopus coronatus (A)
- Green warbler (einersanger), Phylloscopus nitidus (A)
- Two-barred warbler (ospesanger), Phylloscopus plumbeitarsus (A)
- Greenish warbler (østsanger), Phylloscopus trochiloides (A)
- Arctic warbler (lappsanger), Phylloscopus borealis

== Sylviid warblers, parrotbills, and allies ==
Order: Passeriformes Family: Sylviidae

The family Sylviidae is a group of small insectivorous birds. They mainly occur as breeding species, as another common name (Old World warblers) implies, in Europe, Asia and, to a lesser extent, Africa. Most are of generally undistinguished appearance, but many have distinctive songs.

- Eurasian blackcap (munk), Sylvia atricapilla
- Garden warbler (hagesanger), Sylvia borin
- Barred warbler (hauksanger), Curruca nisoria
- Lesser whitethroat (møller), Curruca curruca
- Eastern Orphean warbler (mestersanger), Curruca crassirostris (A)
- Asian desert warbler (ørkensanger), Curruca nana (A)
- Greater whitethroat (tornsanger), Curruca communis
- Sardinian warbler (svarthodesanger), Curruca melanocephala (A)
- Western subalpine warbler (rødbrystsanger), Curruca iberiae (A)
- Eastern subalpine warbler (rødsmekkesanger), Curruca cantillans (A)

== Waxwings ==
Order: Passeriformes Family: Bombycillidae

The waxwings are a group of birds with soft silky plumage and unique red tips to some of the wing feathers. In the Bohemian and cedar waxwings, these tips look like sealing wax and give the group its name. These are arboreal birds of northern forests. They live on insects in summer and berries in winter.

- Bohemian waxwing (sidensvans), Bombycilla garrulus

== Kinglets ==
Order: Passeriformes Family: Regulidae

The kinglets and "crests" are a small family of birds which resemble some warblers. They are very small insectivorous birds in the single genus Regulus. The adults have colored crowns, giving rise to their name.

- Common firecrest (rødtoppfuglekonge), Regulus ignicapilla (A)
- Goldcrest (fuglekonge), Regulus regulus

== Nuthatches ==
Order: Passeriformes Family: Sittidae

Nuthatches are small woodland birds. They have the unusual ability to climb down trees head first, unlike other birds which can only go upwards. Nuthatches have big heads, short tails, and powerful bills and feet.

- Eurasian nuthatch (spettmeis), Sitta europaea

== Treecreepers ==
Order: Passeriformes Family: Certhiidae

Treecreepers are small woodland birds, brown above and white below. They have thin pointed down-curved bills, which they use to extricate insects from bark. They have stiff tail feathers, like woodpeckers, which they use to support themselves on vertical trees.

- Eurasian treecreeper (trekryper), Certhia familiaris

== Wrens ==
Order: Passeriformes Family: Troglodytidae

The wrens are mainly small and inconspicuous except for their loud songs. These birds have short wings and thin down-turned bills. Several species often hold their tails upright. All are insectivorous.

- Eurasian wren (gjerdesmett), Troglodytes troglodytes

== Dippers ==
Order: Passeriformes Family: Cinclidae

Dippers are a group of perching birds whose habitat includes aquatic environments in the Americas, Europe, and Asia. They are named for their bobbing or dipping movements.

- White-throated dipper (fossekall), Cinclus cinclus

== Starlings ==
Order: Passeriformes Family: Sturnidae

Starlings are small to medium-sized passerine birds. Their flight is strong and direct and they are very gregarious. Their preferred habitat is fairly open country. They eat insects and fruit. Their plumage is typically dark with a metallic sheen.

- European starling (stær), Sturnus vulgaris
- Rosy starling (rosenstær), Pastor roseus

== Thrushes and allies ==
Order: Passeriformes Family: Turdidae

The thrushes are a family of birds that occur mainly in the Old World. They are plump, soft-plumaged, small-to-medium-sized insectivores or sometimes omnivores, often feeding on the ground. Many have attractive songs.

- White's thrush (gulltrost), Zoothera aurea (A)
- Swainson's thrush (brunkinnskogtrost), Catharus ustulatus (A)
- Veery (viriskogstrast), Catharus fuscescens (A)
- Gray-cheeked thrush (gråkinnskogtrost), Catharus minimus (A)
- Siberian thrush (sibirtrost), Geokichla sibirica (A)
- Mistle thrush (duetrost), Turdus viscivorus
- Song thrush (måltrost), Turdus philomelos
- Redwing (rødvingetrost), Turdus iliacus
- Eurasian blackbird (svarttrost), Turdus merula
- Fieldfare (gråtrost), Turdus pilaris
- Ring ouzel (ringtrost), Turdus torquatus
- Black-throated thrush (svartstrupetrost), Turdus atrogularis (A)
- Naumann's thrush (rødflekktrost), Turdus naumanni (A)
- Dusky thrush (svartflekktrost), Turdus eunomus (A)
- Eyebrowed thrush (gråstrupetrost), Turdus obscurus (A)

== Old World flycatchers ==
Order: Passeriformes Family: Muscicapidae

Old World flycatchers are a large group of birds which are mainly small arboreal insectivores. The appearance of these birds is highly varied, but they mostly have weak songs and harsh calls.

- Rufous-tailed scrub-robin (hekkskvett), Cercotrichas galactotes (A)
- Dark-sided flycatcher (gråflankefluesnapper), Muscicapa sibirica (A)
- Spotted flycatcher (gråfluesnapper), Muscicapa striata
- European robin (rødstrupe), Erithacus rubecula
- White-throated robin (hvitstrupenattergal), Irania gutturalis (A)
- Thrush nightingale (nattergal), Luscinia luscinia
- Common nightingale (sørnattergal), Luscinia megarhynchos (A)
- Bluethroat (blåstrupe), Luscinia svecica
- Siberian rubythroat (rubinstrupe), Calliope calliope (A)
- Mugimaki flycatcher (mugimakifluesnapper), Ficedula mugimaki (A)
- Red-breasted flycatcher (dvergfluesnapper), Ficedula parva
- Taiga flycatcher (taigafluesnapper), Ficedula albicilla (A)
- Collared flycatcher (halsbåndfluesnapper), Ficedula albicollis (A)
- European pied flycatcher (svarthvit fluesnapper), Ficedula hypoleuca
- Red-flanked bluetail (blåstjert), Tarsiger cyanurus (A)
- Black redstart (svartrødstjert), Phoenicurus ochruros
- Common redstart (rødstjert), Phoenicurus phoenicurus
- Rufous-tailed rock-thrush (steintrost), Monticola saxatilis (A)
- Whinchat (buskskvett), Saxicola rubetra
- Siberian stonechat (asiasvartstrupe), Saxicola maurus (A)
- European stonechat (svartstrupe), Saxicola rubicola
- Desert wheatear (ørkensteinskvett), Oenanthe deserti (A)
- Pied wheatear (svartstrupesteinskvett), Oenanthe pleschanka (A)
- Eastern black-eared wheatear (tyrkersteinskvett), Oenanthe melanoleuca (A)
- Northern wheatear (steinskvett), Oenanthe oenanthe
- Isabelline wheatear (isabellasteinskvett), Oenanthe isabellina (A)

== Accentors ==
Order: Passeriformes Family: Prunellidae

The accentors are the only bird family which is endemic to the Palearctic. They are small, fairly drab species superficially similar to sparrows.

- Alpine accentor (alpejernspurv), Prunella collaris (A)
- Black-throated accentor (svartstrupejernspurv), Prunella atrogularis (A)
- Dunnock (jernspurv), Prunella modularis
- Siberian accentor (sibirjernspurv), Prunella montanella (A)

== Old World sparrows ==
Order: Passeriformes Family: Passeridae

In general, Old World sparrows tend to be small, plump, brown or gray birds with short tails and short powerful beaks. Sparrows are seed eaters, but they also consume small insects.

- House sparrow (gråspurv), Passer domesticus
- Spanish sparrow (middelhavsspurv), Passer hispaniolensis (A)
- Eurasian tree sparrow (pilfink), Passer montanus

== Wagtails and pipits ==
Order: Passeriformes Family: Motacillidae

Motacillidae is a family of small birds with medium to long tails which includes the wagtails, longclaws, and pipits. They are slender ground-feeding insectivores of open country.

- Gray wagtail (vintererle), Motacilla cinerea
- Western yellow wagtail (gulerle), Motacilla flava
- Citrine wagtail (sitronerle), Motacilla citreola
- Eastern yellow wagtail (østgulerle), Motacilla tschutschensis (A)
- White wagtail (linerle), Motacilla alba
- Blyth's pipit (mongolpiplerke), Anthus godlewskii (A)
- Tawny pipit (markpiplerke), Anthus campestris (A)
- Richard's pipit (tartarpiplerke), Anthus richardi
- Pechora pipit (tundrapiplerke), Anthus gustavi (A)
- Tree pipit (trepiplerke), Anthus trivialis
- Olive-backed pipit (sibirpiplerke), Anthus hodgsoni (A)
- Red-throated pipit (lappiplerke), Anthus cervinus
- Siberian pipit (amurpiplerke), Anthus japonicus
- American pipit (kanadapiplerke), Anthus rubescens (A)
- Meadow pipit (heipiplerke), Anthus pratensis
- Water pipit (vannpiplerke), Anthus spinoletta (A)
- Rock pipit (skjærpiplerke), Anthus petrosus

== Finches, euphonias, and allies ==
Order: Passeriformes Family: Fringillidae

Finches are seed-eating birds that are small to moderately large and have a strong beak, usually conical and in some species very large. All have twelve tail feathers and nine primaries. These birds have a bouncing flight with alternating bouts of flapping and gliding on closed wings, and most sing well.

- Brambling (bjørkefink), Fringilla montifringilla
- Common chaffinch (bokfink), Fringilla coelebs
- Hawfinch (kjernebiter), Coccothraustes coccothraustes
- Common rosefinch (rosenfink), Carpodacus erythrinus
- Pine grosbeak (konglebit), Pinicola enucleator
- Eurasian bullfinch (dompap), Pyrrhula pyrrhula
- Mongolian finch (steinfink), Bucanetes mongolicus (A)
- Trumpeter finch (trompetfink), Bucanetes githagineus (A)
- European greenfinch (grønnfink), Chloris chloris
- Twite (bergirisk), Linaria flavirostris
- Eurasian linnet (tornirisk), Linaria cannabina
- Redpoll (gråsisik), Acanthis flammea
- White-winged crossbill (båndkorsnebb), Loxia leucoptera
- Parrot crossbill (furukorsnebb), Loxia pytyopsittacus
- Red crossbill (grankorsnebb), Loxia curvirostra
- European goldfinch (stillits), Carduelis carduelis
- European serin (gulirisk), Serinus serinus (A)
- Eurasian siskin (grønnsisik), Spinus spinus

== Longspurs and snow buntings ==
Order: Passeriformes Family: Calcariidae

The Calcariidae are a family of birds that had been traditionally grouped with the New World sparrows, but differ in a number of respects and are usually found in open grassy areas.

- Lapland longspur (lappspurv), Calcarius lapponicus
- Snow bunting (snøspurv), Plectrophenax nivalis

== Old World buntings ==
Order: Passeriformes Family: Emberizidae

Emberizidae is a family of passerine birds containing a single genus. Until 2017, the New World sparrows (Passerellidae) were also considered part of this family.

- Pallas's bunting (krattspurv), Emberiza pallasi (A)
- Reed bunting (sivspurv), Emberiza schoeniclus
- Yellow-browed bunting, Emberiza chrysophrys (A)
- Chestnut bunting (kastanjespurv), Emberiza rutila (A)
- Yellow-breasted bunting (sibirspurv), Emberiza aureola (A) (critically endangered)
- Little bunting (dvergspurv), Emberiza pusilla
- Rustic bunting (vierspurv), Emberiza rustica (vulnerable)
- Black-faced bunting (gråhodespurv), Emberiza spodocephala (A)
- Black-headed bunting (svarthodespurv), Emberiza melanocephala (A)
- Red-headed bunting (brunhodespurv), Emberiza bruniceps (A)
- Corn bunting (kornspurv), Emberiza calandra (A)
- Gray-necked bunting (rødbrystspurv), Emberiza buchanani (A)
- Ortolan bunting (hortulan), Emberiza hortulana
- Cretzschmar's bunting, Emberiza caesia (A)
- Pine bunting (hvithodespurv), Emberiza leucocephalos (A)
- Yellowhammer (gulspurv), Emberiza citrinella

== New World sparrows ==
Order: Passeriformes Family: Passerellidae

Until 2017, these species were considered part of the family Emberizidae. Most of the species are known as sparrows, but these birds are not closely related to the Old World sparrows which are in the family Passeridae. Many of these have distinctive head patterns.

- Dark-eyed junco (vinterjunko), Junco hyemalis (A)
- White-throated sparrow (hvitstrupespurv), Zonotrichia albicollis (A)
- White-crowned sparrow (hvitkronespurv), Zonotrichia leucophrys (A)
- Savannah sparrow, Passerculus sandwichensis (A)
- Song sparrow (sangspurv), Melospiza melodia (A)

== Troupials and allies ==
Order: Passeriformes Family: Icteridae

The icterids are a group of small to medium-sized, often colorful passerine birds restricted to the New World and include the grackles, New World blackbirds, and New World orioles. Most species have black as a predominant plumage color, often enlivened by yellow, orange, or red.

- Bobolink (bobolink), Dolichonyx oryzivorus (A)
- Baltimore oriole (lundtrupial), Icterus galbula (A)
- Brown-headed cowbird (brunhodetrupial), Molothrus ater (A)

== New World warblers ==
Order: Passeriformes Family: Parulidae

Parulidae are a group of small, often colorful birds restricted to the New World. Most are arboreal and insectivorous.

- Ovenbird (ovnparula), Seiurus aurocapilla (A)
- Black-and-white warbler (klatreparula), Mniotilta varia (A)
- Blackpoll warbler (svarthetteparula), Setophaga striata (A) (near-threatened)
- Cape May warbler (brunkinnparula), Setophaga tigrina (A)
- Yellow-rumped warbler (myrteparula), Setophaga coronata (A)

== Cardinals and allies ==
Order: Passeriformes Family: Cardinalidae

The cardinals are a family of robust seed-eating birds with strong bills. They are typically associated with open woodland. The sexes usually have distinct plumages.

- Rose-breasted grosbeak (rosenbrysttykknebb), Pheucticus ludovicianus (A)

== See also ==
- List of birds
- Lists of birds by region
