= Paul Alexander Zino =

Portuguese-born British ornithologist (1916–2004)

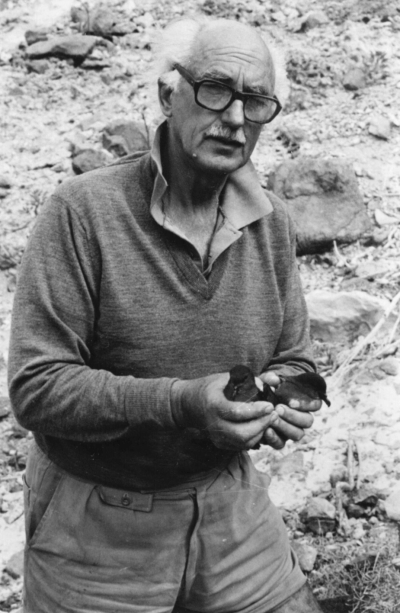
- Born: 9 February 1916
- Died: 3 March 2004 (aged 88)
- Scientific career
- Fields: ornithology

Paul Alexander Zino (9 February 1916 – 3 March 2004) was a British businessman and ornithologist after whom Zino's petrel (Pterodroma madeira) is named.

Zino was born in Madeira to a British family of land dealers and was educated in England at St. Edmund's College, Ware, and studied languages at Christ's College, Cambridge. In 1963, he took part in an expedition to the Savage Islands and was shocked to see the annual slaughter of shearwaters by fishermen. He then bought out all hunting rights to the islands to prevent hunting. Returning in 1967, Zino built a house, employing fishing folk who had been put out of hunting business, and began studying the breeding biology of Cory's shearwaters (Calonectris borealis). A coup in Portugal in 1974 encouraged the local fishermen to go on a rampage and destroy all the birds and Zino's research station. This vandalism prompted the government to take up protection of the birds and led to the inclusion of the islands in the Madeira Natural Park in 1986.

Zino also visited the Desertas Islands, studying the Fea's petrel (Pterodroma feae). This led to an interest in the smaller P. madeira which had first been discovered in 1903 on Madeira itself. Zino managed, by playing calls of the birds to local informants, to rediscover the location of the colony and protect it. Zino was awarded the Commendador da Ordem do Infante Dom Henrique by Portugal in 1990 and a Certificate of Merit from the UK in 1988.
