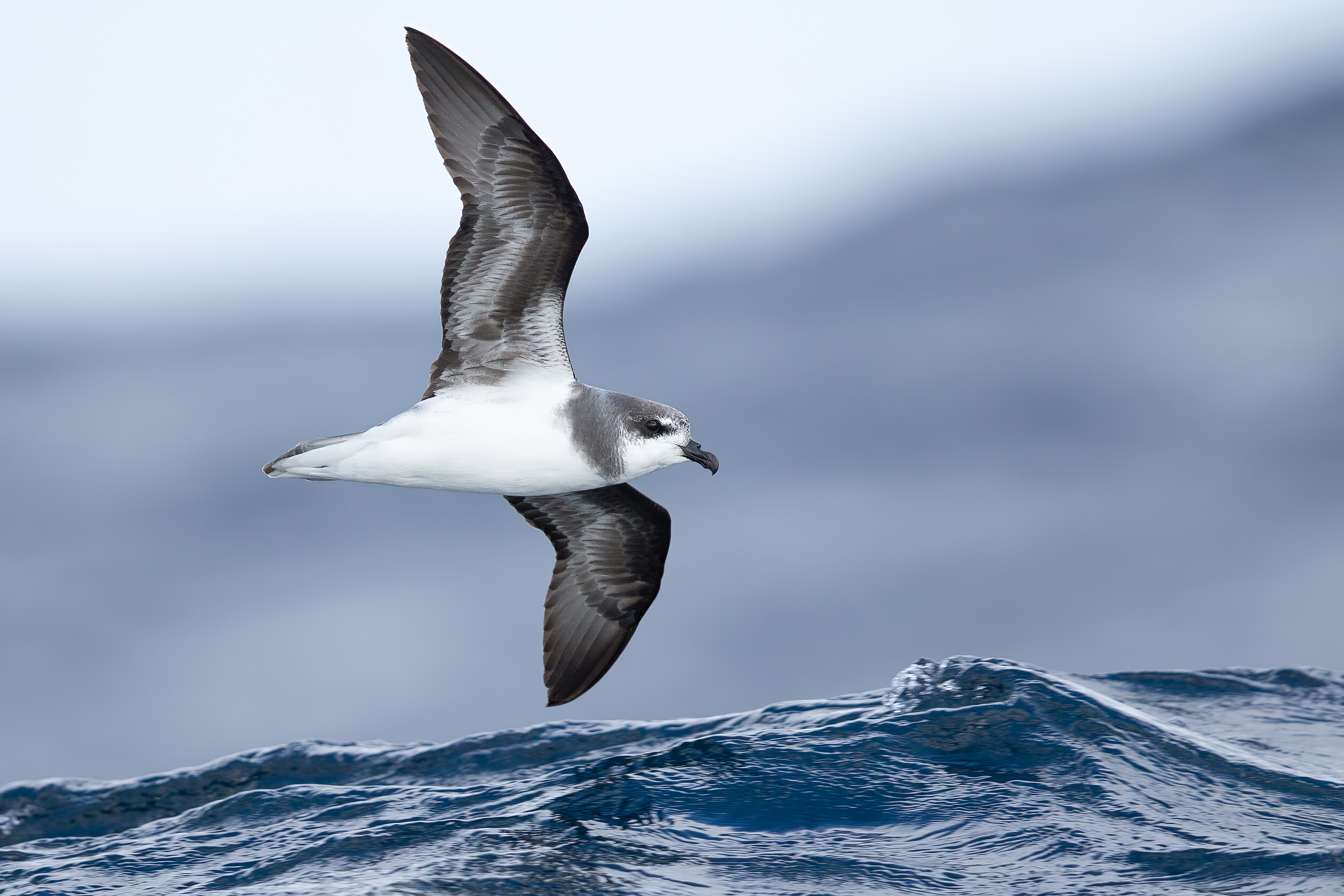
- Ventral plumage.
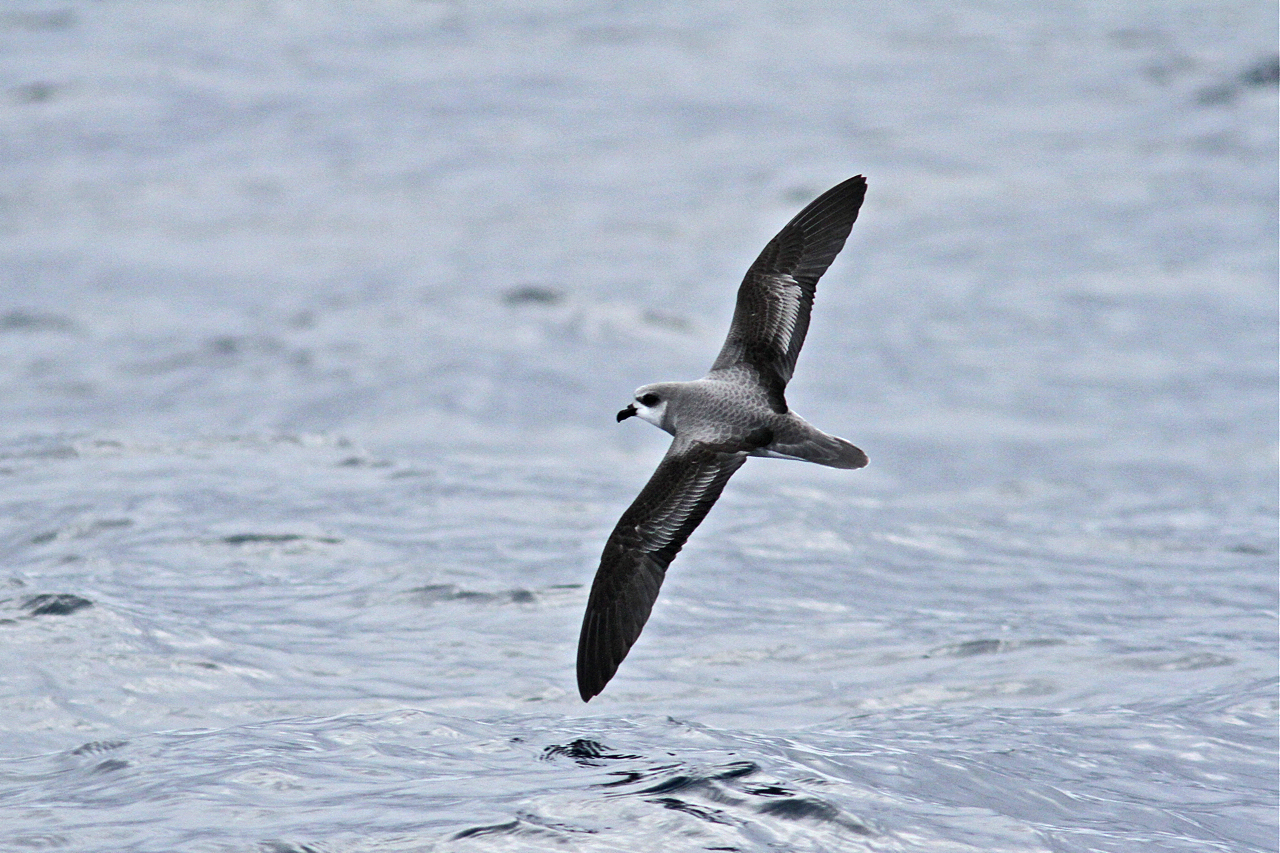
- Dorsal plumage. Photographed on pelagic waters near Albany, Western Australia.

Conservation status
- Least Concern (IUCN 3.1)

Scientific classification
- Kingdom: Animalia
- Phylum: Chordata
- Class: Aves
- Order: Procellariiformes
- Family: Procellariidae
- Genus: Pterodroma
- Species: P. mollis

Binomial name
- Pterodroma mollis (Gould, 1844)

= Soft-plumaged petrel =

Species of bird

The soft-plumaged petrel (Pterodroma mollis) is a species of seabird in the family Procellariidae.

== Distribution ==
It breeds on islands in the Southern Hemisphere, nesting on Tristan da Cunha, Gough Island, the Prince Edward Islands, Crozet Islands, Macquarie Island, and on the Antipodes Islands of New Zealand. Small numbers breed in the Maatsuyker Island Group of southern Tasmania. It disperses outside the breeding season, reaching eastern South America north to Brazil, southern Africa and Australia. It has occurred as a vagrant in Norway and Jordan.

== Taxonomy ==
Fea's petrel (P. feae), Desertas petrel (P. desertae) and Zino's petrel (P. madeira) of the North Atlantic were formerly treated as subspecies of this bird.

== Description ==
The soft-plumaged petrel is a medium-sized petrel. Its plumage is dark grey and white, and its wings are narrow and with a pointed tail distinct in flight. It has a dark grey head with prominent white feathers on the cheeks and throat. There is a white speckling on forehead along with a prominent dark eye patch. Its underside is mostly white, which turned dark grey at underwings. The bill is black and about 25–32 mm long and has a sharp hook. Its legs are pink with black on the outer webs and toes. There is also the dark morph, which is another variation of the petrel.

Both sexes are noisy, making medium-pitched moans and shrill squeaks.

== Gallery ==
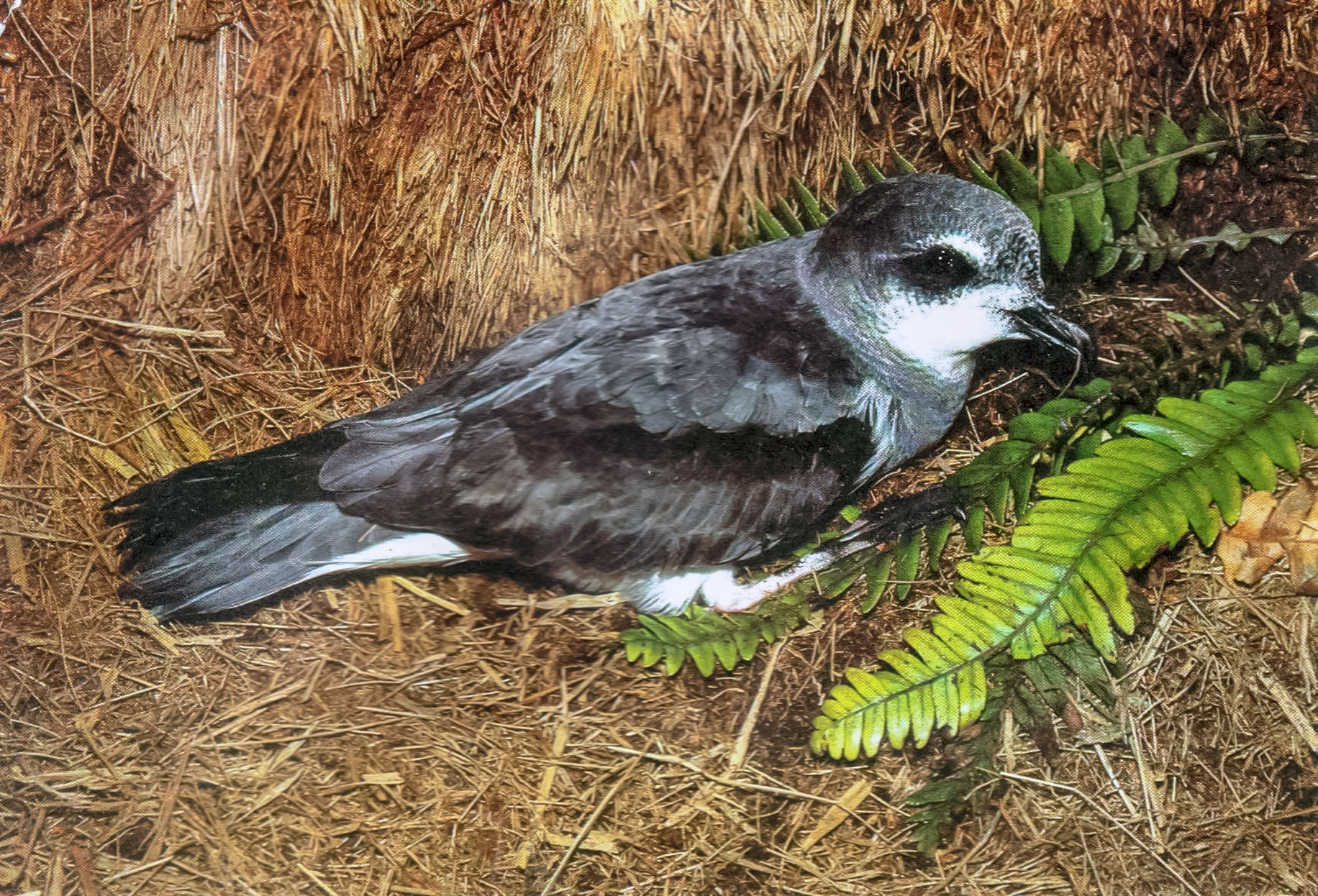
On land

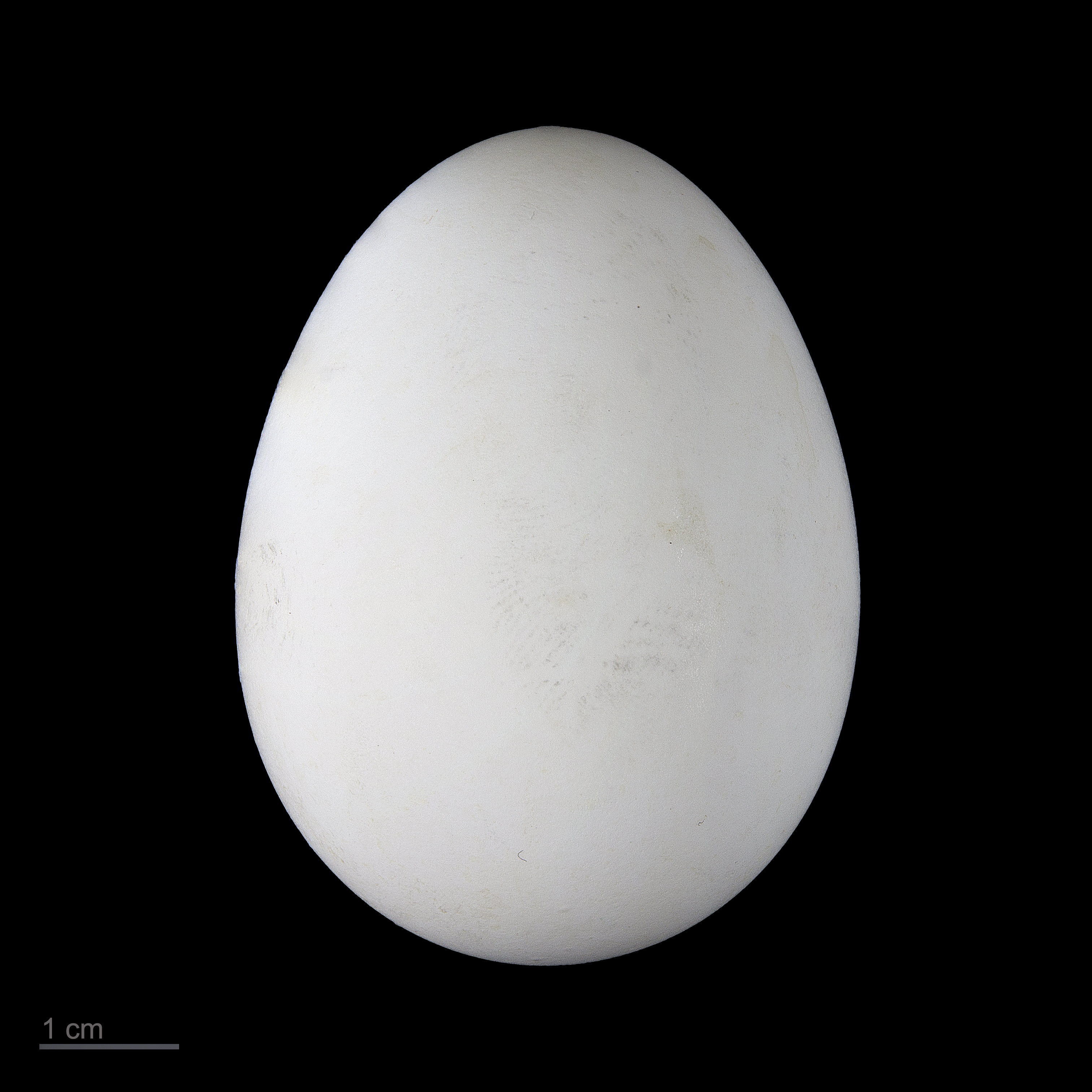
Pterodroma mollis - MHNT

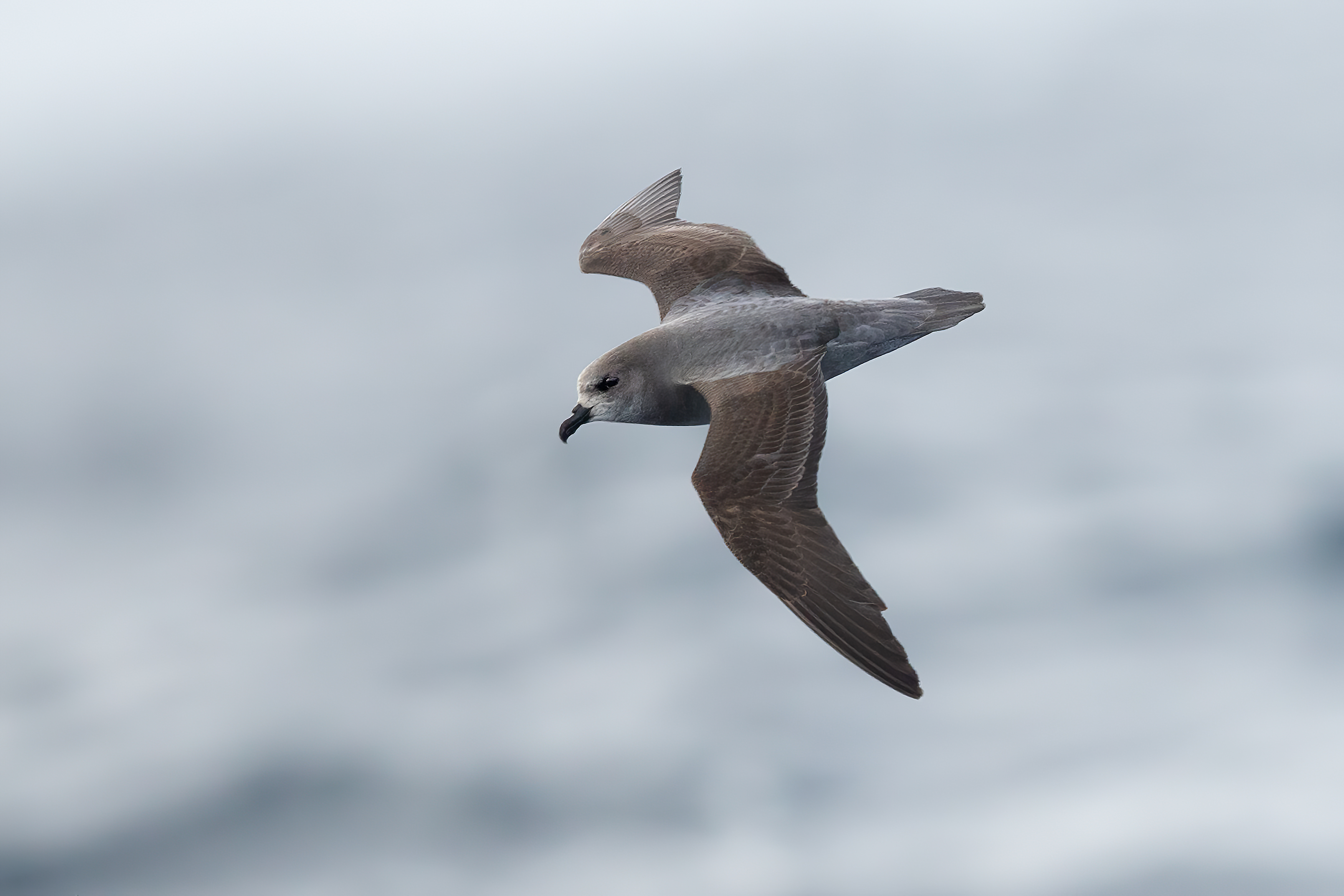
Dark morph
