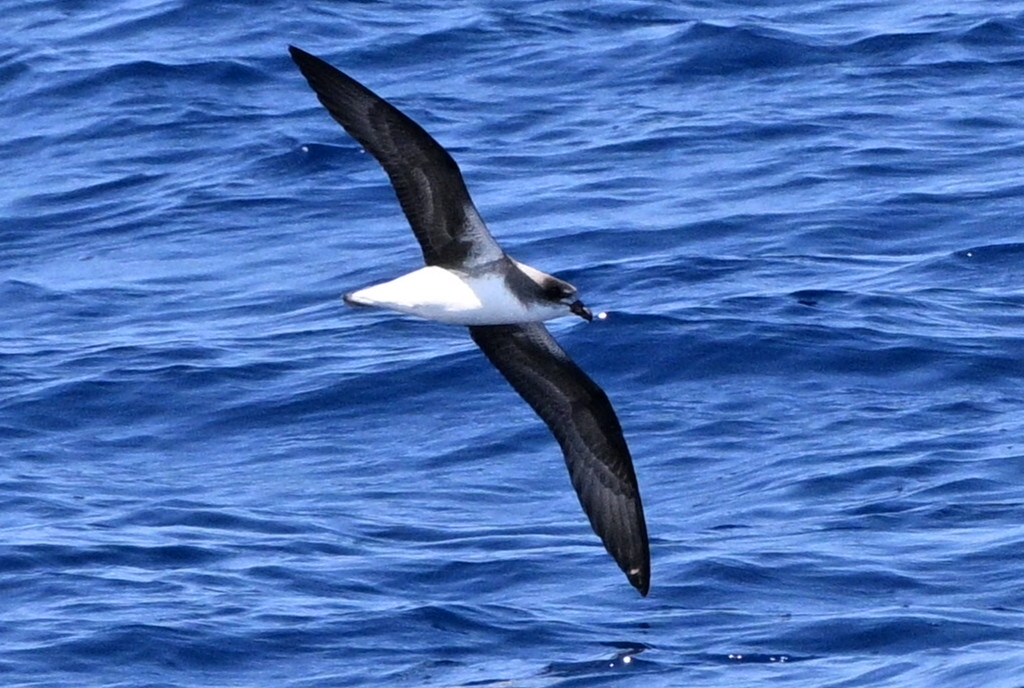

Conservation status
- Vulnerable (IUCN 3.1)

Scientific classification
- Kingdom: Animalia
- Phylum: Chordata
- Class: Aves
- Order: Procellariiformes
- Family: Procellariidae
- Genus: Pterodroma
- Species: P. deserta

Binomial name
- Pterodroma deserta Mathews, 1934

Synonyms
- Pterodroma mollis deserta; Pterodroma feae deserta

= Desertas petrel =

Species of bird

The Desertas petrel (Pterodroma deserta) is a small seabird in the gadfly petrel genus which breeds on Bugio Island in the Desertas off Madeira.

== Taxonomy ==
The gadfly petrels in the genus Pterodroma are seabirds of temperate and tropical oceans. Many are little-known, and their often similar appearance have caused the taxonomy of the group to be rather fluid. Although the systematics on this species has not yet been definitively established, provisionally some authorities have split the Desertas petrel, separating the Desertas breeding birds from those in the Cape Verde archipelago, while others consider it a subspecies of the Fea's petrel. The species is named after its breeding grounds, which are pronounced "Dez-ERT-ash".

== Description ==
As all three of the species in the Pterodroma feae/madeira/deserta complex were once believed to be subspecies of a single species: Pterodroma mollis, the extreme difficulty in telling them apart is easily understood. A summary of data from a morphological study sheds light on the issue:

- In overall size feae is closer to deserta and both are bigger than madeira (wing length - f:262, d: 264, m: 248; tarsus - f:34.7, d: 35.2, m: 32.7).
- Bill length once again similar in feae and deserta and both larger than madeira (f:29.0, d: 28.6, m: 26.3).
- Bill depth by far biggest in deserta, lowest in madeira, and intermediate in feae (f:11.9, d: 12.9, m: 10.5).

In terms of ratios:

- (Bill length/wing length) (f:11.1%, d: 10.8%, m: 10.6%) is rather similar in the three taxa.
- (Bill length/bill depth) (f: 2.44, d: 2.22, m: 2.53) is lowest in deserta, and highest in madeira. In feae it is intermediate, but more than twice closer to madeira than to deserta.

== Behavior ==
A 2024 study by the Woods Hole Oceanographic Institute found that unlike many other seabird species, which tend to flee from hurricanes, the Desertas petrel follows the paths of hurricanes to feed on fish and squid brought to the surface by the increased ocean mixing.
