= Madeira Natural Park =

Protected area in Portugal

- IUCN category VI (protected area with sustainable use of natural resources)
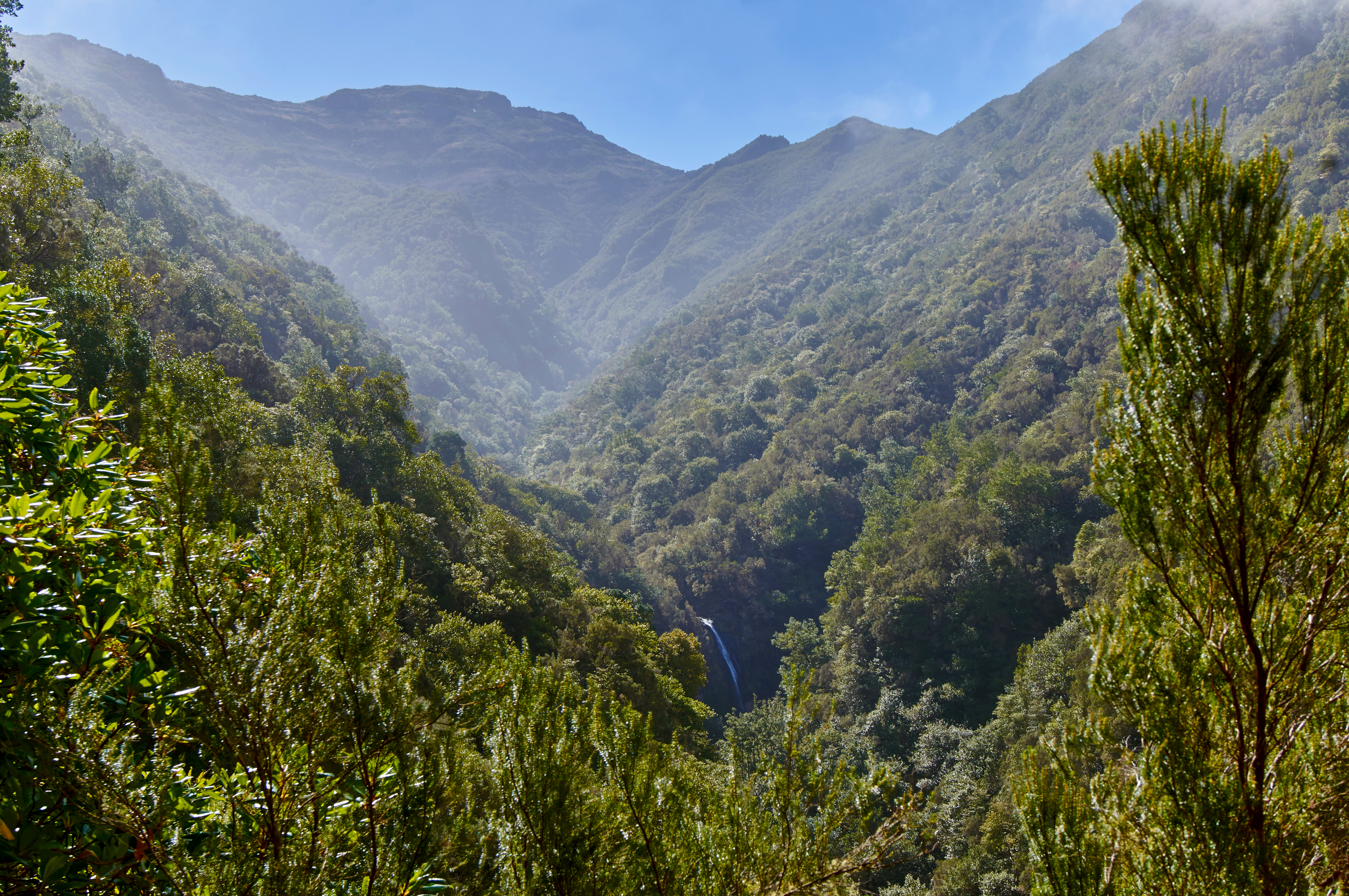
- Levada do Caldeirão Verde
- Interactive map of Madeira Natural Park
- Location: Madeira Island, Portugal
- Coordinates: 32°45′N 17°00′W
- Area: 444 km^{2} (171 sq mi)
- Established: 10 Nov 1982

The Madeira Natural Park (Portuguese: Parque Natural da Madeira) is a large biological reserve in Madeira with a unique endemic flora and fauna. It was created in 1982 to safeguard the natural heritage of the archipelago, and contains a number of endangered species including global rarities such as Zino's petrel. This nature park encompasses nearly two-thirds of the territory of the island of Madeira, and within it are nature reserves, protected landscapes and leisure zones. Its key habitat is the laurel forest. Madeira's evergreen forests were designated a UNESCO World Heritage Site in 1999.
