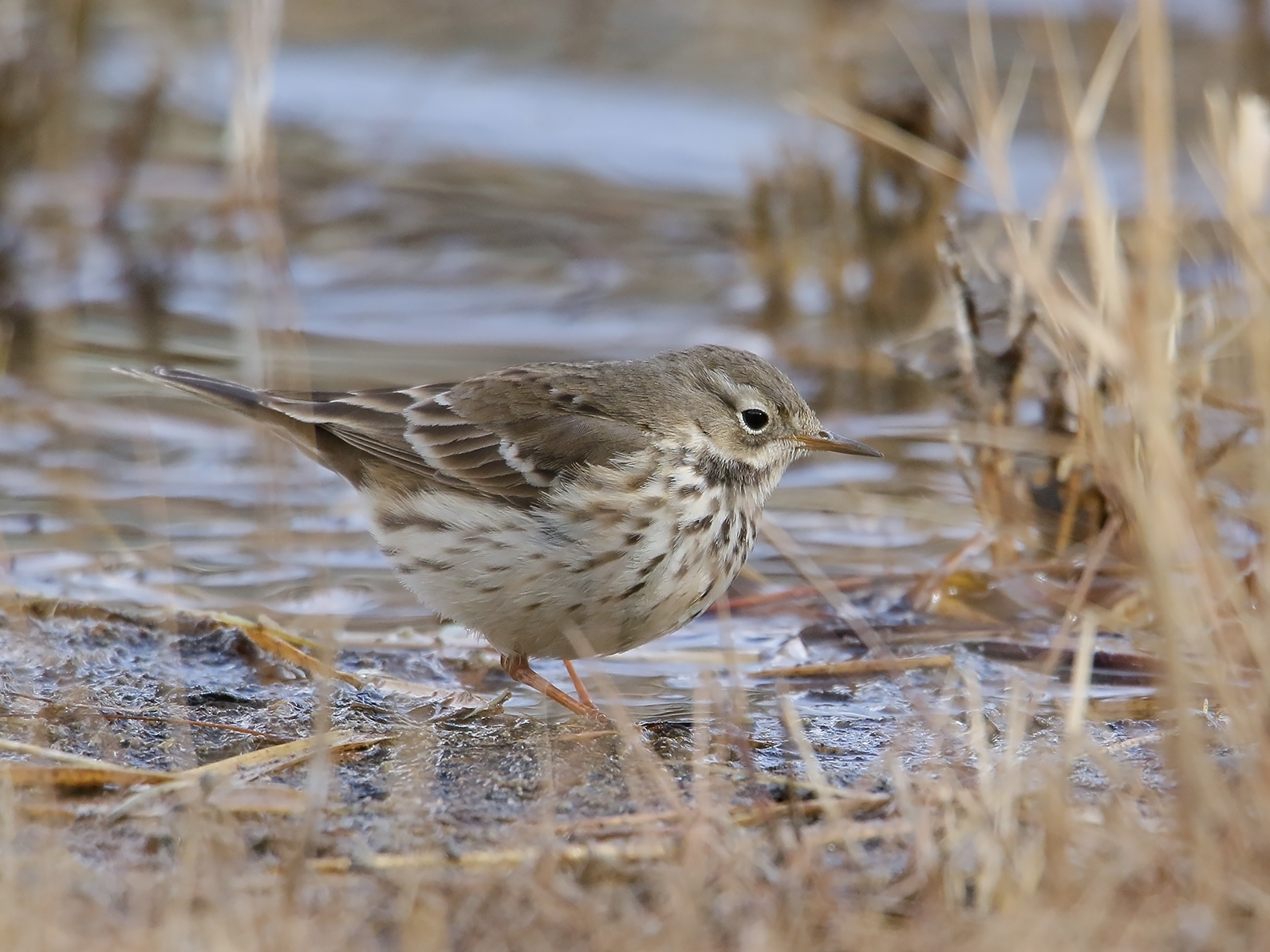
- Adult captured in Pakistan

Conservation status
- Least Concern (IUCN 3.1)

Scientific classification
- Kingdom: Animalia
- Phylum: Chordata
- Class: Aves
- Order: Passeriformes
- Family: Motacillidae
- Genus: Anthus
- Species: A. japonicus

Binomial name
- Anthus japonicus Temminck & Schlegel, 1847
- Range Breeding Migration Nonbreeding

= Siberian pipit =

Species of bird

The Siberian pipit (Anthus japonicus), also known as the Japanese pipit and formerly known as the buff-bellied pipit, is a species of songbird in the family Motacillidae. It was split from the American pipit in 2024 by both the IOC and Clements checklist. It is found in East Asia.

== Taxonomy ==
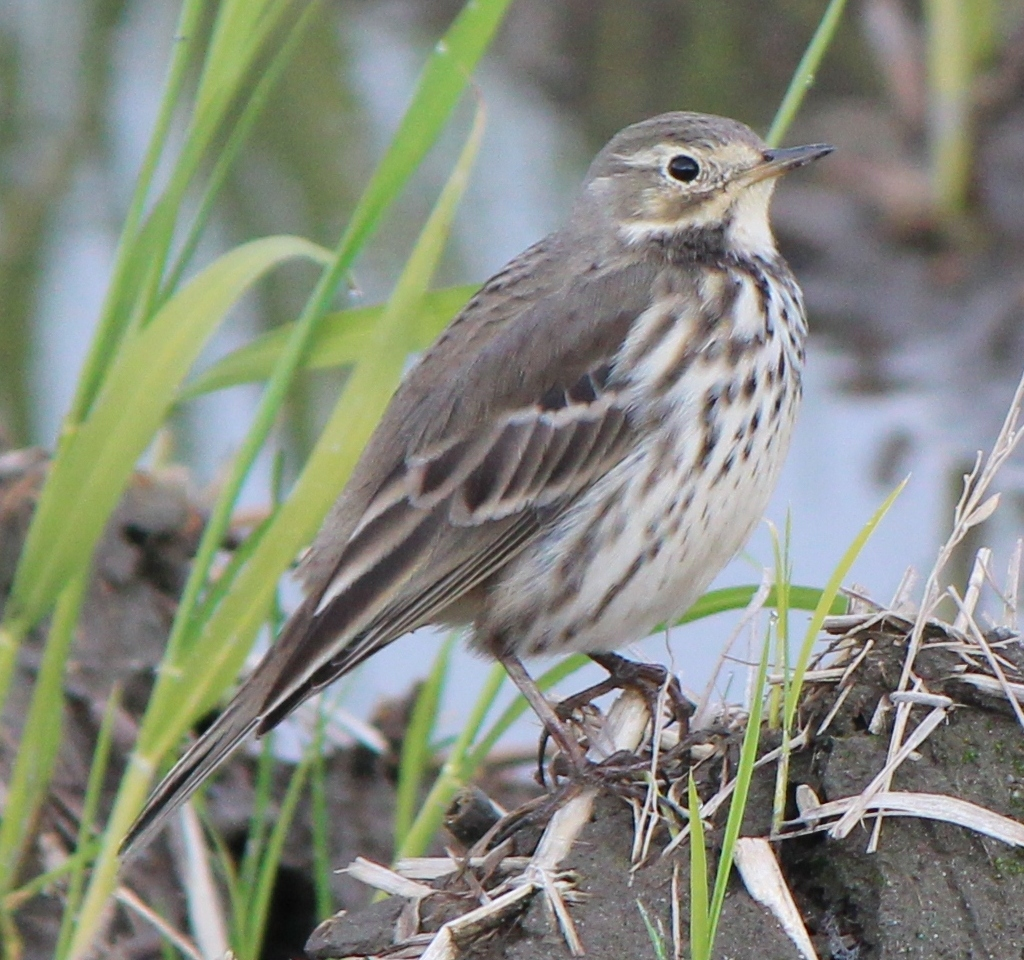
Adult seen in Japan

The Siberian pipit was described and illustrated by the ornithologists Coenraad Jacob Temminck and Hermann Schlegel in 1847 based on a specimen collected in Japan. They considered it a subspecies of meadow pipit and coined the trinomial name Anthus platensis japonicus. It was formerly considered to be conspecific with both the water pipit and rock pipit, before being split into the buff-bellied pipit alongside the American pipit. The differences between the two have long been noted, and are most pronounced in their non-breeding plumages. A study published in 2023 found that divergence between the Siberian pipit and the American pipit was at a level typical for species divergence in pipits. The study also found differences in songs between the two, and recommended that the two be split. This recommendation was followed by both the IOC and Clements checklist in 2024.

== Behaviour ==
The Siberian pipit is migratory. Breeding in Siberia and Northern Japan and China. Wintering mainly from Pakistan east to and Southeast Asia, with occasional birds found as far north as Yunnan and some in Japan apparently being all-year residents or migrating but a little.
