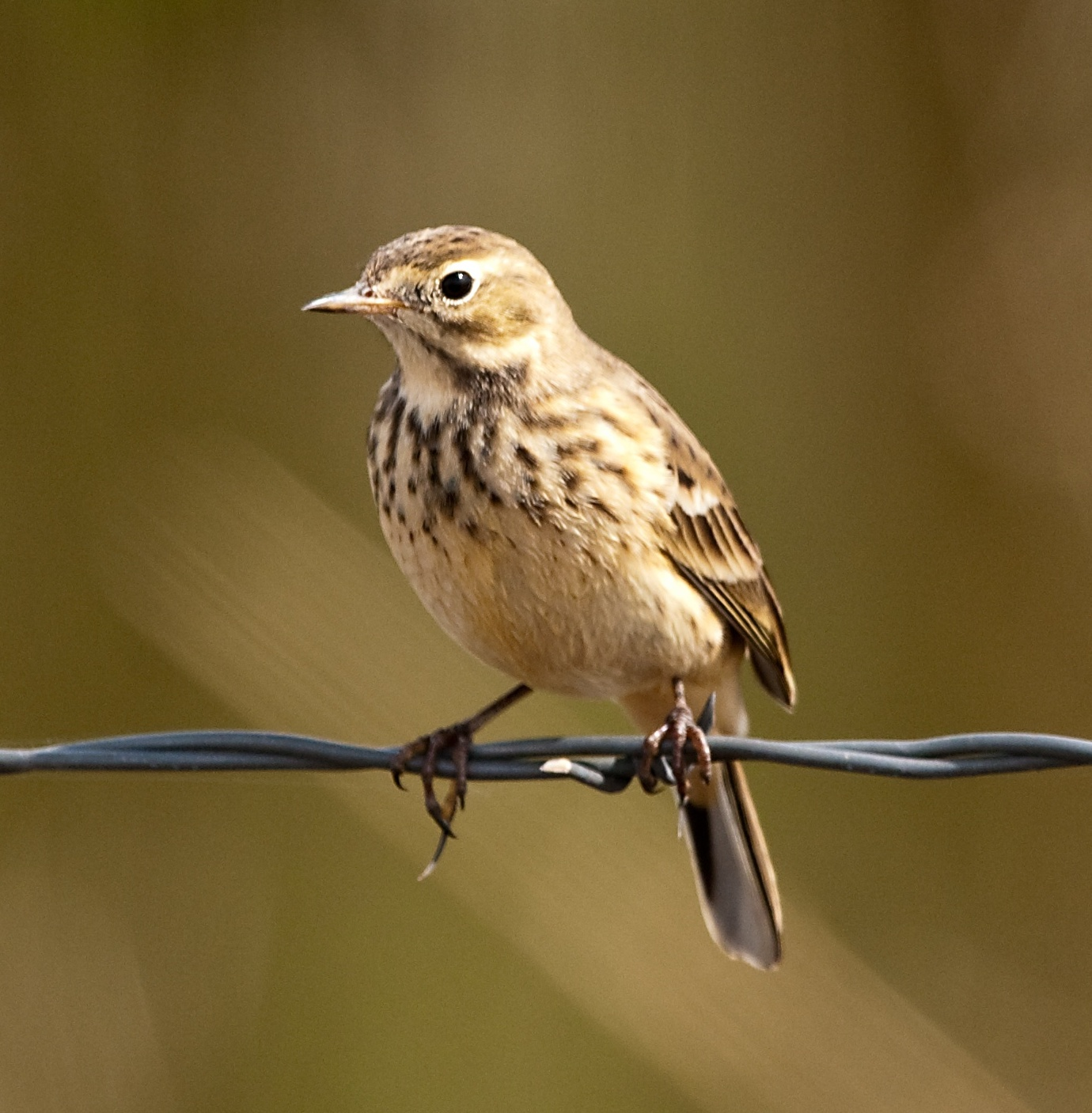
- Nominate subspecies in Oregon, USA American pipit recorded in Minnesota

Conservation status
- Least Concern (IUCN 3.1)

Scientific classification
- Kingdom: Animalia
- Phylum: Chordata
- Class: Aves
- Order: Passeriformes
- Family: Motacillidae
- Genus: Anthus
- Species: A. rubescens

Binomial name
- Anthus rubescens (Tunstall, 1771)
- American pipit range map Breeding Migration Wintering

Synonyms
- Anthus pensilvanicus

= American pipit =

Species of bird

The American pipit (Anthus rubescens), formerly known as the buff-bellied pipit, is a small songbird native to North America. It was first described by Marmaduke Tunstall in his 1771 Ornithologia Britannica. It was formerly classified as a form of the water pipit. The former subspecies, Siberian pipit, is now considered a distinct species.

== Description ==
Like most other pipits, the American pipit is an undistinguished-looking species which usually can be seen to run around on the ground. It has lightly streaked grey-brown upperparts and is diffusely streaked below on the buff breast and flanks. The belly is whitish, the bill and legs are dark. The related Siberian pipit is darker above and has bolder black streaking on its whiter underparts; its legs have a reddish hue. The call is a squeaky sip.

Measurements:

- Length: 16 cm
- Weight: 22 g
- Wingspan: 24 cm

== Taxonomy ==
The scientific name is from Latin. Anthus is the name for a small bird of grasslands, and the specific rubescens means "reddish", from ruber, "ruddy".

Three subspecies are currently recognized:

- A. r. rubescens - (Tunstall, 1771), American pipit – breeds in northern Canada east to Greenland and northeast United States, wintering in Central America
- A. r. pacificus - (Todd, 1935) Breeds in Pacific Cordillera from Alaska to Oregon, wintering in western Mexico. Birds breeding in south Alaska have sometimes been recognized as a distinct subspecies A. r. geophilus.
- A. r. alticola - (Todd, 1935) Breeds in the Rocky Mountains from southern British Columbia to California, wintering in Mexico

This species is closely related to European rock pipit (A. petrosus) and water pipit (A. spinoletta), all three forms having previously been considered conspecific. They can be differentiated by their vocalizations and some visual cues, but rock and American pipit are not found sympatrically except as vagrant individuals.

== Behavior ==
All subspecies of the American pipit are migratory. The American pipit winters on the Pacific coast of North America, and on the Atlantic coast from the southern North America to Central America. At least regarding the American pipit, its wintering range seems to have expanded northwards in the 20th century and the birds seem to spend less time in winter quarters: in northern Ohio, for example, the species was recorded as "not common" during migration in May and September/October in the 1900s (decade), but today it is considered a "widespread migrant" in that region, found between March and May and from late September to November, with many birds actually wintering this far north. The American pipit is a rare vagrant to Western Europe.

Like its relatives, this species is insectivorous. The breeding habitat of American pipit is tundra, but outside the breeding season it is found in open lightly vegetated areas, similar to those favoured by the water pipit (A. spinoletta).

== Reproduction: from pairing to fledging ==
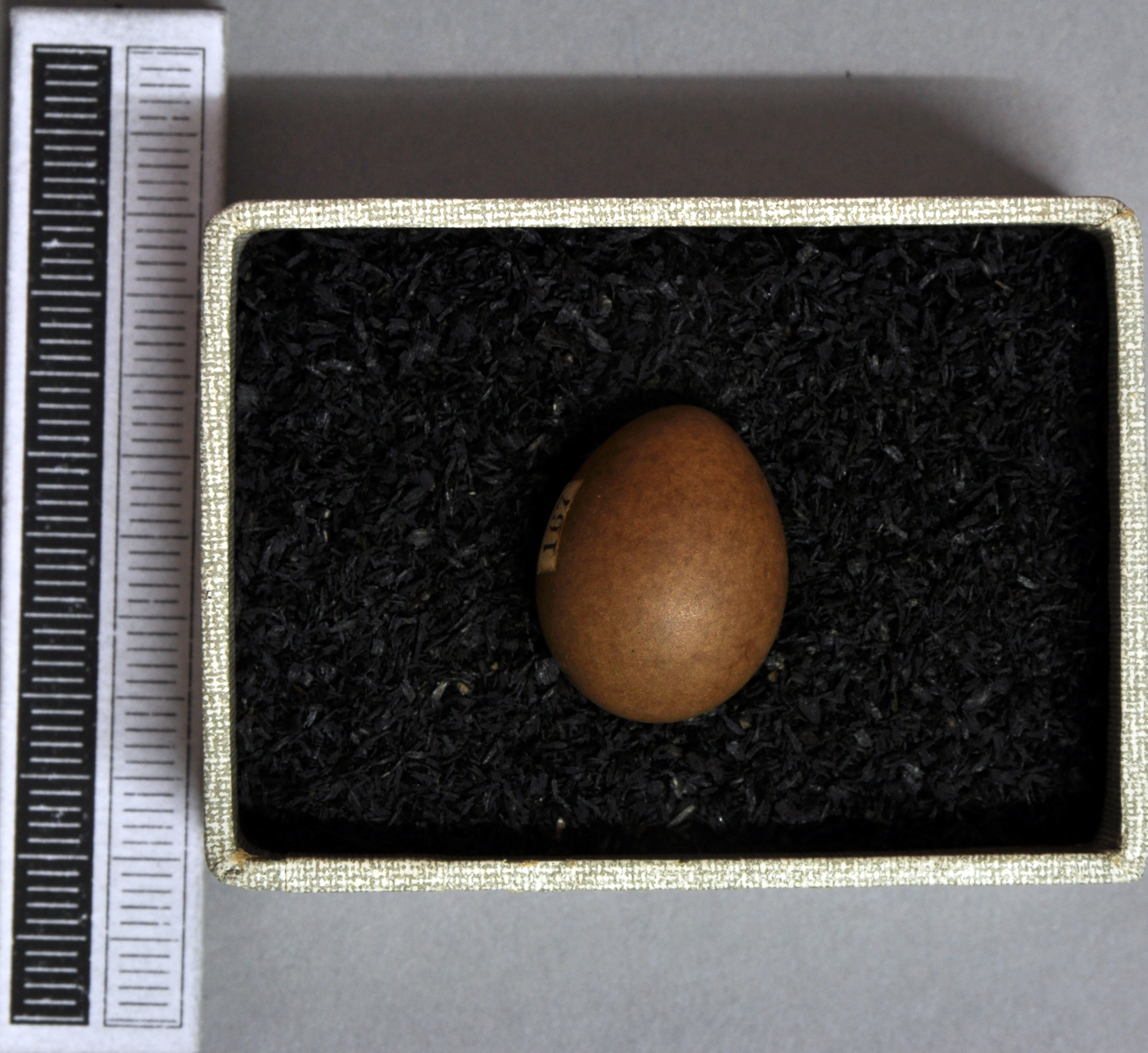
Egg, Collection Museum Wiesbaden

The first thing American pipits do when they arrive on the breeding site, during snowmelt, is pairing. Indeed, males will start to fight one on one to win over the female and pair with it during the entire breeding season. They also fight for the snow-free sites that would be better for nesting. The moment is also very important because the melting snow implies an increase in arthropods abundance, which constitute the main food source for these birds. After the fight and the pairing, nesting is the next step. Nests are most often found on the ground in dry or wet meadows, always with a helpful protection, but they are never placed in shrubs or trees. The composition of the ideal nest depends on whatever is around the nesting area, but it is usually made of sedge, remains or new fine grass, and sometimes some horse hairs. The final issue buff-bellied pipits have to deal with is nest success. The nest is indeed the target for numerous predators such as ants or hawks. If this step is successful, an egg can be produced. The female will not lay an egg if the conditions, such as temperature and nesting site, are not optimal. If the first attempt fails, her time to lay an egg is reduced. In general, American pipits continuously lay eggs over a period of 4 to 5 days after snow-melt (in April–May) until mid-July. After this period, the male testes decrease in size and the female refuses any copulation. The clutch size is usually 5 eggs but it can vary according to snowfalls, the parents' reproductive ability and predation. Eggs are incubated for 13–14 days. During this time, the female does not leave the nest, but is still very reactive to any movement around her. She communicates by singing to the male that brings her food and defends their territory. Four or five days after hatching, the young is skinny, blue-gray in color, and only has its secondary feathers. For a week, the female will brood the clutch, but both parents will feed them. After these 7 days, the birds are ready for fledging but they will still be fed by their parents for 14 days after their departure. Finally, immature birds will form little flocks with other immature birds and wander off.

== Status ==
It is a widespread and common species and not considered threatened by the IUCN.
