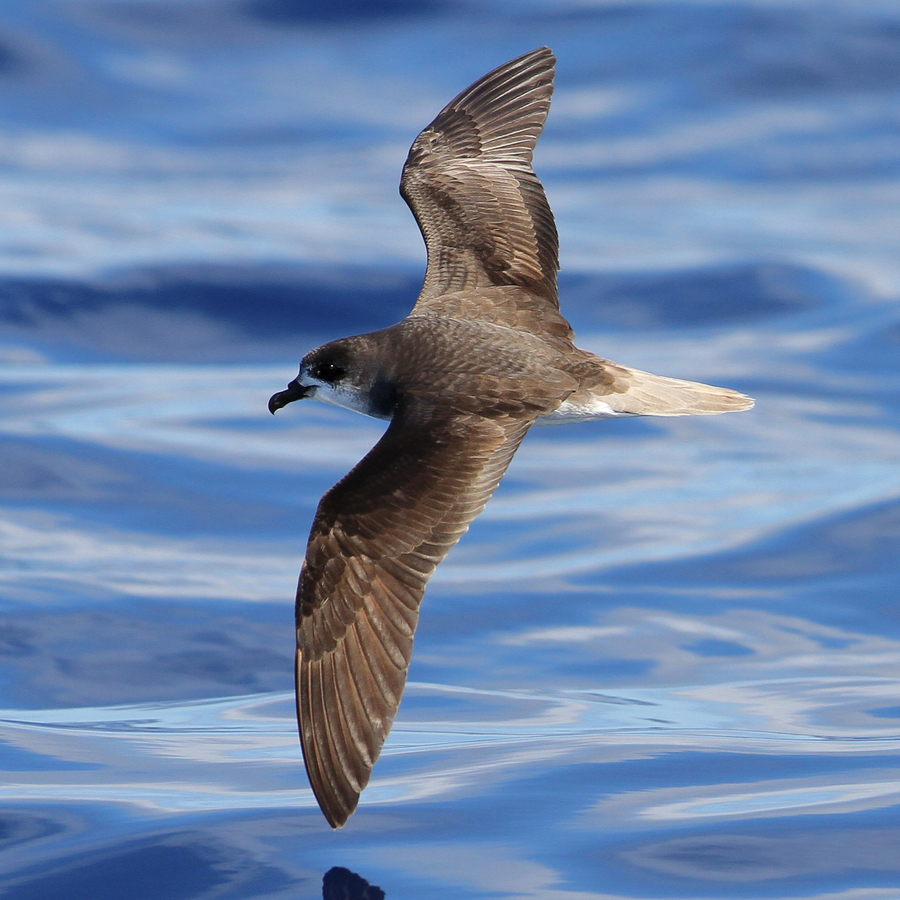
- View of upperparts
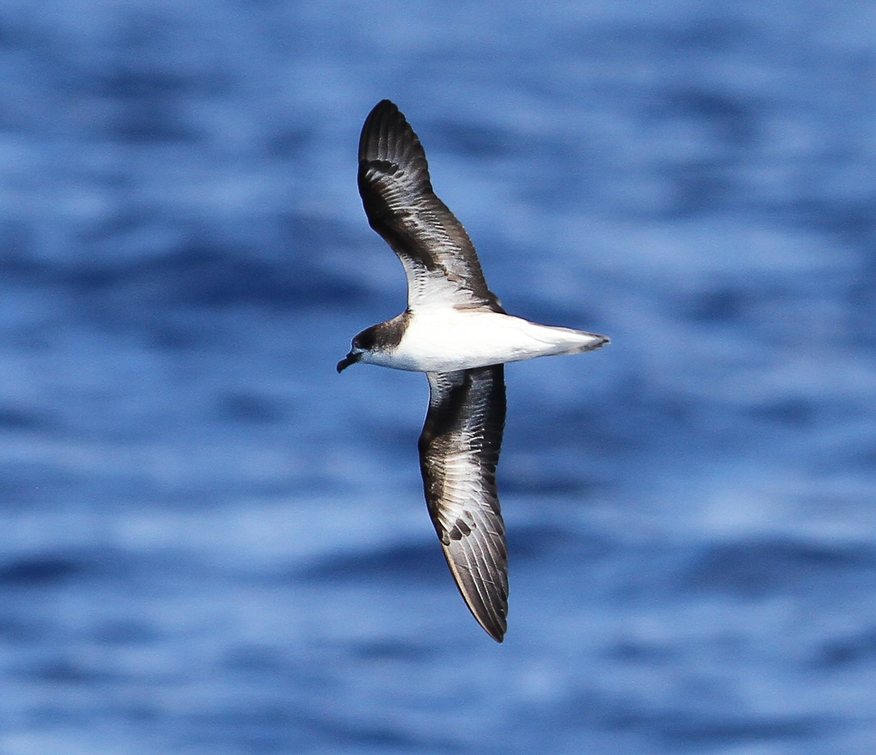
- View of underparts

Conservation status
- Endangered (IUCN 3.1)

Scientific classification
- Kingdom: Animalia
- Phylum: Chordata
- Class: Aves
- Order: Procellariiformes
- Family: Procellariidae
- Genus: Pterodroma
- Species: P. madeira

Binomial name
- Pterodroma madeira Mathews, 1934
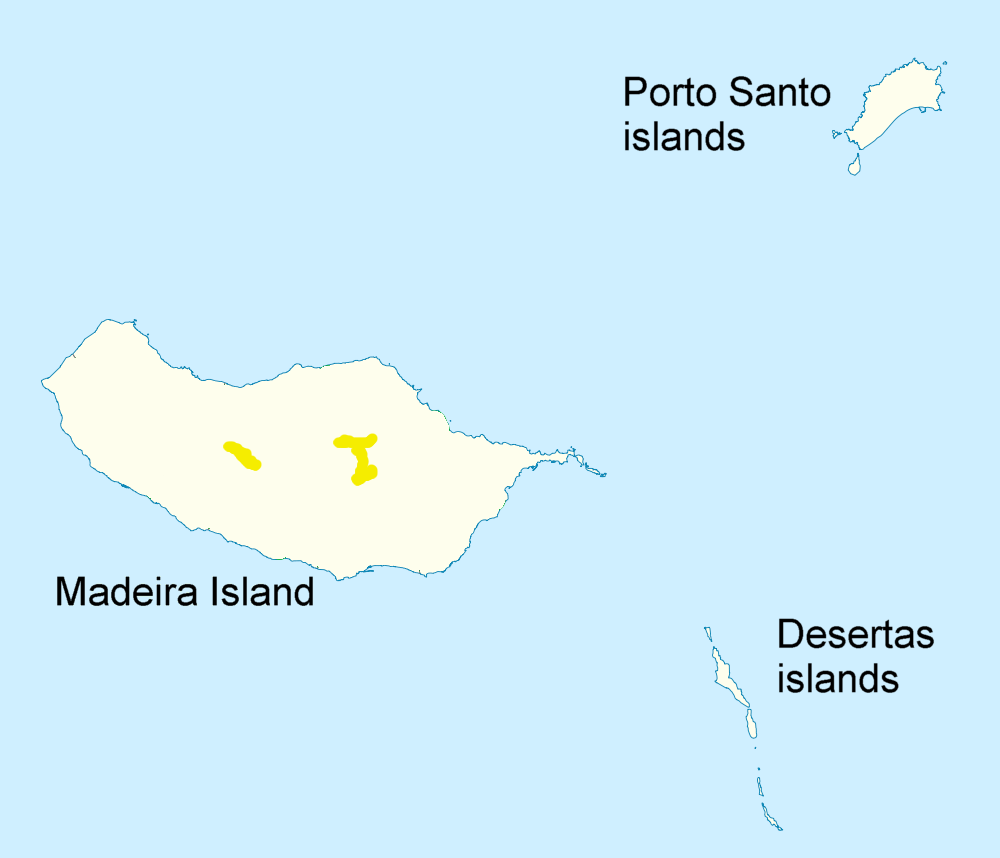
- Nesting areas (winters at sea)

Synonyms
- Pterodroma mollis madeira

= Zino's petrel =

Small seabird in the gadfly petrel genus

Zino's petrel (Pterodroma madeira) or the freira, is a species of small seabird in the gadfly petrel genus, endemic to the island of Madeira. This long-winged petrel has a grey back and wings, with a dark "W" marking across the wings, and a grey upper tail. The undersides of the wings are blackish apart from a triangle of white at the front edge near the body, and the belly is white with grey flanks. It is very similar in appearance to the slightly larger Fea's petrel, and separating these two Macaronesian species at sea is very challenging. It was formerly considered to be a subspecies of the soft-plumaged petrel, P. mollis, but they are not closely related, and Zino's was raised to the status of a species because of differences in morphology, calls, breeding behaviour and mitochondrial DNA. It is one of Europe's most endangered seabirds, with breeding areas restricted to a few ledges high in the central mountains of Madeira.

Zino's petrel nests in burrows which are visited only at night, when they give their haunting calls. The single white egg is incubated by both adults, one sitting during the day while the other feeds on fish and squid at sea. Eggs, chicks and adults have been subject to predation by introduced cats and rats, and in the past have been taken for food by local shepherds. Predator control, and other measures such as the removal of grazing animals that trample the burrows, have enabled the population to recover to 65–80 breeding pairs; the species remains listed as endangered on the IUCN Red List. However, conservation efforts had a major setback in August 2010 when fires killed three adults and 65 percent of the chicks. The population eventually recovered and was stable at 160 individuals by 2018.

== Taxonomy ==
The gadfly petrels in the genus Pterodroma are seabirds of temperate and tropical oceans. Many are little-known, and their often similar appearance have caused the taxonomy of the group to be rather fluid. The forms breeding in Macaronesia on Madeira, Bugio in the Desertas Islands, and in the Cape Verde archipelago were long considered to be subspecies of the Southern Hemisphere soft-plumaged petrel, P. mollis, but mitochondrial DNA analysis, and differences in size, vocalisations, breeding behaviour, showed that the northern birds are not closely related to P. mollis, and that the Bermuda petrel or Cahow may be the closest relative of the Macaronesian birds. Ornithologist George Sangster recommended establishing Zino's petrel on Madeira and Fea's petrel on the Desertas and Cape Verde as full species, and the species split was accepted by the Association of European Rarities Committees (AERC) in 2003.

Nunn and Zino estimated that the two Macaronesian species diverged at the end of the Early Pleistocene, 850,000 years ago. An analysis of feather lice taken from Fea's petrels, Pterodroma feae deserti, from Bugio Island, and from Zino's petrels from the Madeiran mainland showed that there were marked differences between the two seabirds in terms of the parasites they carried, suggesting that they have long been isolated since lice can normally only be transferred through physical contact in the nest. The species on Zino's petrel are most similar to those of the Bermuda petrel, whereas Fea's petrel's lice are like those of Caribbean and Pacific Pterodroma species. This suggests that despite the close physical proximity of the two species of gadfly petrel found in the Madeiran archipelago, they may have arisen from separate colonisations of mainland Madeira and, later, the Desertas Islands. Although their reproductive isolation has allowed the separate evolutionary development of the two species, genetic evidence shows the three Macaronesian petrels are each other's closest relatives.

The petrels breeding in the high central mountains of Madeira were first recorded in 1903 by German naturalist and priest Ernst Johann Schmitz, who failed to realise that they were different from the Fea's petrels he had seen in the Desertas. The species was formally described as a race of soft-plumaged petrel by Australian amateur ornithologist Gregory Mathews in 1934. Following the recognition of the Madeiran birds as a full species, they were named after the British ornithologist, Paul Alexander Zino, who was instrumental in their conservation during the latter half of the twentieth century. The genus name Pterodroma is derived from Greek πτερον, pteron, "a wing", and δρομος, dromos, "running", and refers to the bird's swift erratic flight. The specific madeira refers to the island on which it breeds. The Portuguese name Freira means "nun"; the inhabitants of Curral das Freiras (Nun's Valley) near the breeding site claimed that the nocturnal wailing of the petrels in the breeding season were the calls of the suffering souls of the nuns. The sisters had taken refuge in the valley from attacks on the island by French pirates in 1566 that lasted for 15 days.

Pterodroma petrel remains dated between 60,000 and 25,000 years BP were found in two cave sites in Gibraltar. They consist of a more abundant form similar in size to Zino's, and a larger, less common type. It is uncertain whether they represent the site of a former breeding colony, or are the result of a seabird wreck in which storms blow birds inland. They do suggest, however, that members of the genus were formerly more widespread.

== Description ==
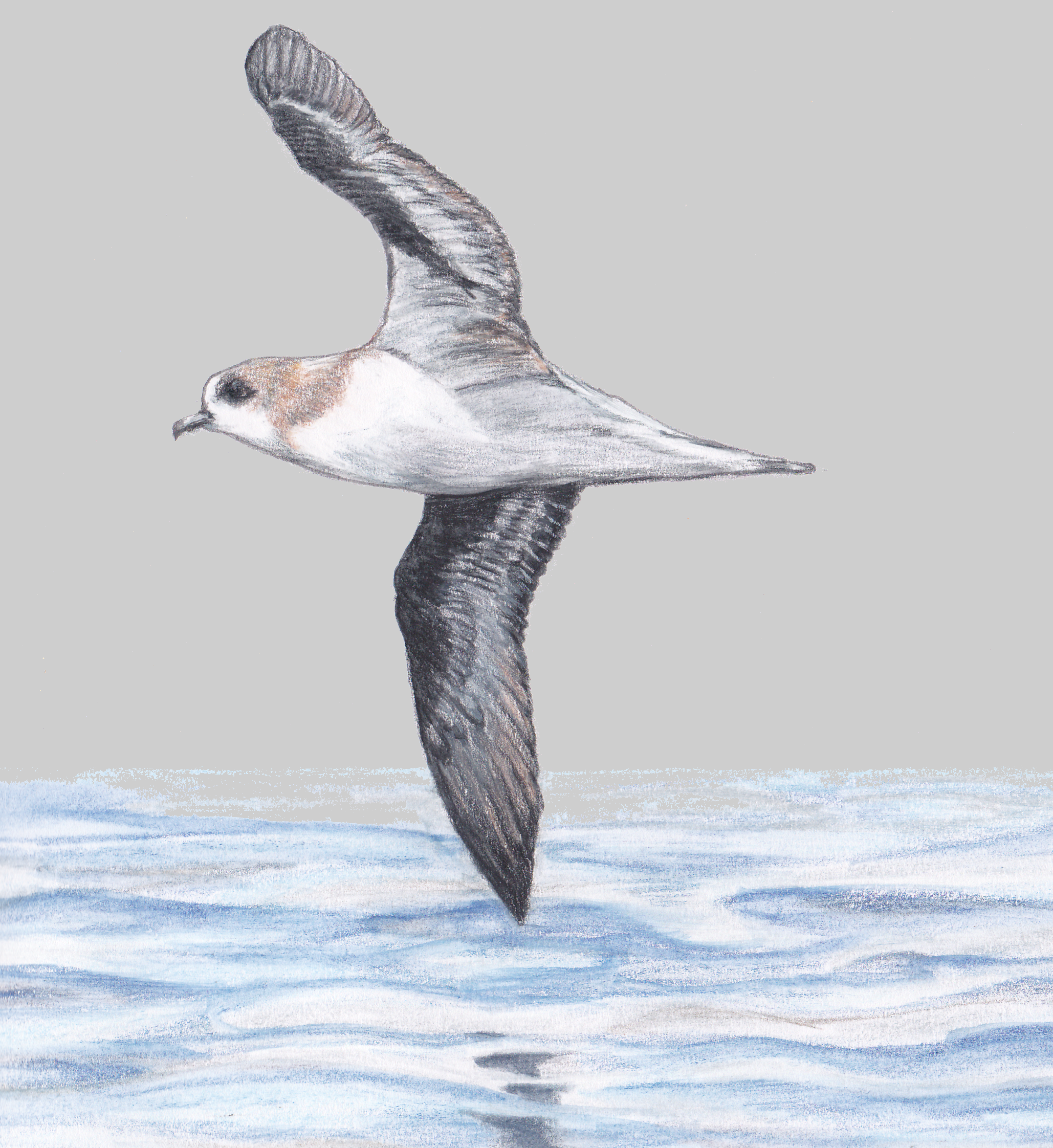
Illustration of species

This long-winged petrel is 32–34 cm (13–13 in) long with an 80–86 cm (31–34 in) wingspan, and an average weight of 290 g (10 oz). It has a grey back, grey wings with a dark "W" marking across them, and a grey upper tail. The undersides of the wings are blackish, apart from a triangle of white at the front edge near the body, and the belly is white with grey flanks. The head has a mottled whitish-brown forehead, a dark cap, and a dark spot below and behind the brown eye. The bill is black and the legs are flesh pink, the colour continuing onto the first third of the feet, the rest of the toes and webs being black-brown. It gives the general impression of a small Cory's or great shearwater, with a fast flight; in strong winds it shears high above the surface with angled wings. Nothing is known of the fresh juvenile plumage or the moult sequence, and age assessment is currently not feasible.

This species is very similar in appearance to the Fea's petrel, but is smaller. The size difference and lighter flight may not be apparent at sea, especially with lone birds, but a recent study helped to clarify other useful features. Zino's has a diagnostically small, delicate, often rather long and slender bill, which may be obvious in the most slender-billed examples, which are probably mostly females, but can be difficult to determine in larger-billed, probably adult male, birds. Another useful feature is a large whitish panel on the underwing. The wing panel is exclusive to Zino's but is only shown by 15% of the birds. Zino's has a more rounded wing tip, but P. feae deserti sometimes shows a rounded wing tip, so this feature is not diagnostic. Previously suggested criteria such as head, upper wing and flank patterns were found to be inconclusive. Off the eastern United States and the Azores, both Macaronesian petrels are easily distinguished from the larger Bermuda petrel by that species' upperparts, which are uniformly dark but for a pale grey rump.

This species at its breeding sites gives a long mournful call like the hooting of a tawny owl, and a much less frequent sound like the whimpering of a pup. It is silent at sea. The breeding calls are very similar to those of Fea's petrel, and Bretagnolle's analysis of the calls of the soft-plumaged petrel complex led him to suggest in 1995 only a two-way species split, with the northern forms madeira, feae and deserti all as subspecies of Fea's petrel.

=== "Snowy-winged petrel" ===
The Hadoram Shirihai expeditions to the Madeira archipelago in 2008, 2009, and 2010 each had sightings of a Pterodroma petrel (possibly the same bird) with largely white underwings, but upper wings like Zino's or Fea's. This plumage does not correspond to any known Pterodroma species. It may have been an unusual variant of Zino's but this is unlikely since no similar bird has been seen amongst the more than 100 caught at the nest. It may alternatively be a single aberrant individual, a hybrid or an unknown taxon from Madeira or elsewhere. No conclusion is possible on current knowledge.

== Distribution and habitat ==
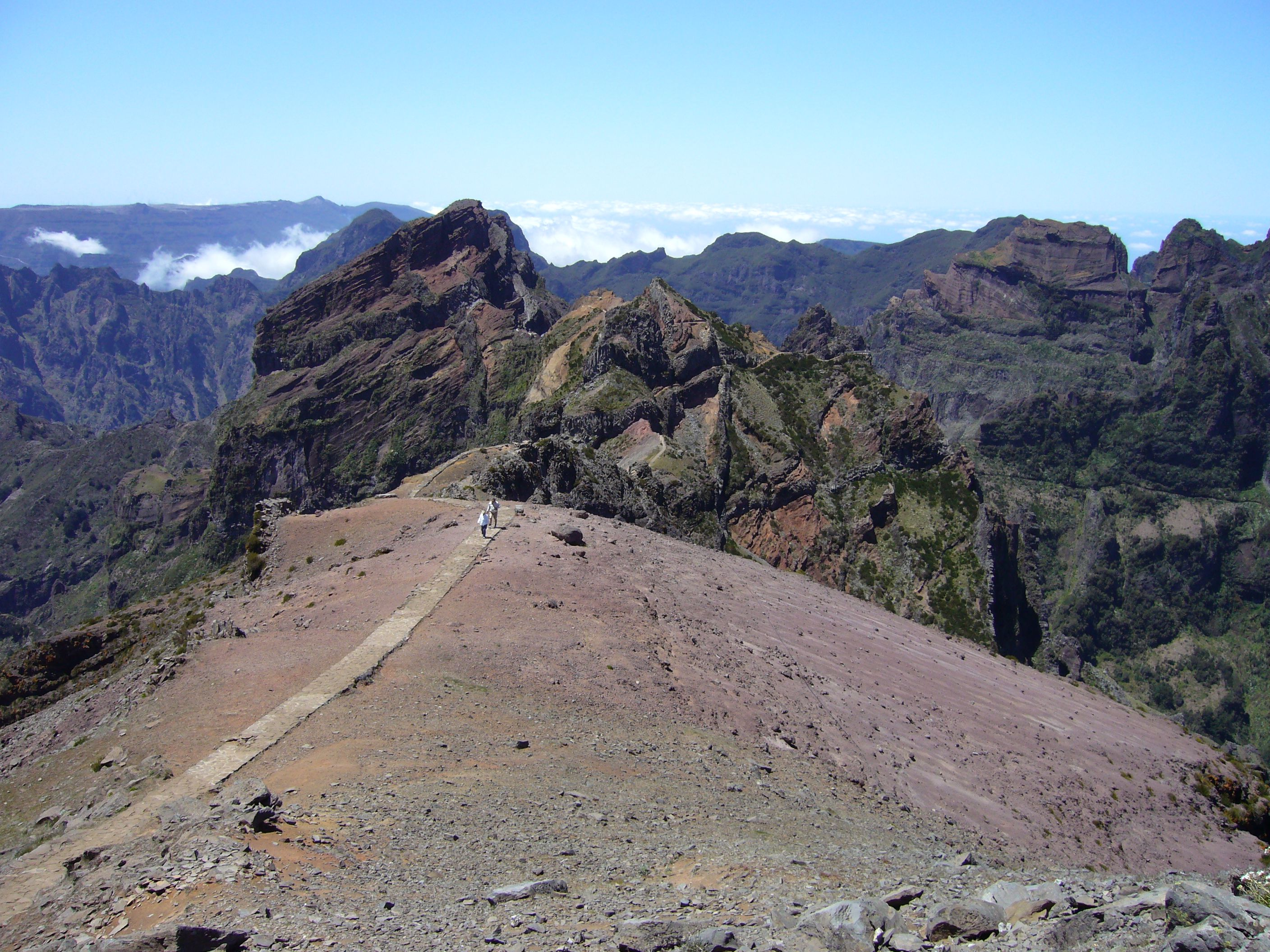
Track to the breeding ledges

Zino's petrel is endemic to the main island of Madeira, where it breeds on inaccessible and well-vegetated ledges in the central mountains between Pico do Arieiro and Pico Ruivo. The typical ledge plants are endemic hemicryptophytes and chamaephytes, but grasses may also be present. It nests at heights above 1,650 m (5,410 ft). It was formerly more widespread, since subfossil remains have been found in a cave in eastern Madeira, and on nearby Porto Santo Island. The breeding ledges have to be inaccessible to introduced goats so that they remain rich in endemic flora. The vegetation ensures that there is sufficient earth on the ledges to allow the birds to burrow and make their nests, and trampling by grazing animals reduces the soil cover.

This petrel is only present in Madeiran waters during the breeding season. Its distribution at sea during the rest of the year is poorly known due to the rarity of the species and the difficulty of separating it from other Pterodroma petrels at sea. Birds identified as either Zino's or Fea's have been recorded from both sides of the North Atlantic, and in Ireland and Britain there has been a large increase in the number of reports, perhaps because global warming brings increasing numbers of tropical species into temperate waters. The timing of the reports, mainly in late spring and summer in the western North Atlantic, and in late summer and early autumn in the east, has suggested that birds follow a clockwise route around the North Atlantic after leaving their breeding sites. However, the few birds that have been identified with certainty have all been Fea's. Zino's petrel may have a similar strategy since preliminary results from geolocation studies indicate widespread dispersal over the North Atlantic central ridge during the breeding season and migration towards the Brazilian coast in the non-breeding period. Pterodroma petrels have been recorded in the Canary Islands and the Azores on surprisingly few occasions; a claim of possible Zino's from South Africa is now thought to be erroneous.

== Behaviour ==
=== Breeding ===
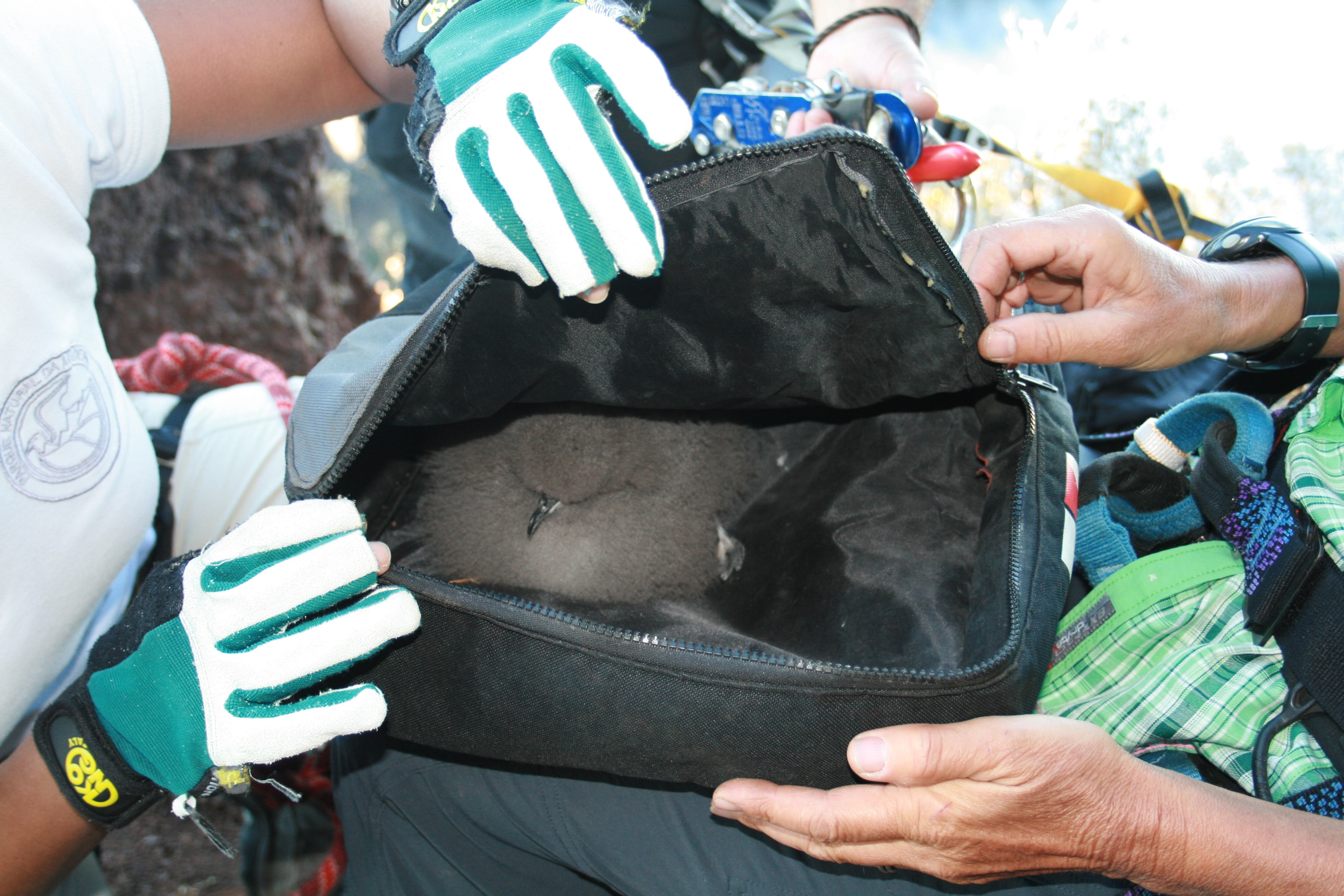
Chick at several weeks old

Zino's petrel breed two months earlier than the Desertas petrel on Bugio, only 50 km (31 mi) away. The birds return from sea to their breeding grounds in late March or early April and courting occurs over the main breeding area during the late evening and early morning hours. The nest is a shallow burrow or old rabbit tunnel up to 140 cm (55 in) long in thick soil on vegetated ledges. The length of the burrow is related to the age of the pair that uses it, young birds making shorter tunnels, which are extended in subsequent years. The oval white egg is laid from mid-May to mid-June in a chamber at the end of the burrow and incubated for 51–54 days, each parent alternating between sitting on the nest and feeding at sea. The young fledge about 85 days later in late September and October. This petrel is strictly nocturnal at the breeding sites to avoid predation by gulls. It stays 3–5 km (1.9–3.1 mi) offshore during the day, coming to land in darkness. It calls from about 30 minutes after nightfall until dawn, including on moonlit nights.

This species mates for life and pairs return to the same burrow year after year. The single egg is not replaced if lost. This is a long-lived species: one individual was observed to return to its burrow for ten consecutive years, and the lifespan is estimated to be about 16 years. The age of first breeding is unknown but assumed to be four or more years. Despite the proximity of their breeding sites, Zino's and Fea's petrels have never been found at each other's nesting areas, and Zino's is not known to hybridise with any other species.

=== Feeding ===
Zino's petrel, like its relatives, feed on small squid and fish. The vomited stomach contents of one bird contained cephalopods, the bioluminescent fish Electrona risso and small crustaceans. Like other small petrels, Zino's does not normally follow ships.

=== Predators and parasites ===
Their nocturnal approach to the breeding sites means that Zino's petrels avoid the attentions of gulls or diurnal raptors, and the only owl on the island, the barn owl, is a rodent hunter. Other than bats, there are no native land mammals on Madeira, although there are a number of introduced species, two of which will take birds or chicks. These are brown rats and feral domestic cats. Even the high mountain nest sites of the Zino's petrel are not safe from these adaptable predators, ten adults being killed by cats in 1990. Feather lice found on Zino's petrels include Trabeculus schillingi, Saemundssonia species and an unnamed species of Halipeurus.

== Conservation status ==
Zino's petrel has a very restricted range on the mountaintops of a single island and is one of Europe's most endangered seabirds. The birds, already confined to a limited area when discovered, were thought to be extinct by the mid-twentieth century. Two freshly fledged juveniles were found within the walls of the governor's palace in Funchal in the early 1940s, presumably attracted there by lights, but the species was not seen again until 1969. In 1969, Paul Zino played a tape of Fea's petrel from Bugio to a shepherd from Curral das Freiras; he immediately recognised the call and led the researchers to the remaining nesting area. Predation by introduced rats meant that breeding success in the small population was low, and no young at all fledged in 1985. The Freira Conservation Project was founded in 1986 with the aim of increasing the population of Zino's petrel by controlling rats and human interference; the control was extended to cats after the mass predation of 1990.

There are now 130–160 known individuals (65–80 breeding pairs) confirmed to breed on just six ledges. There may be some disturbance from visitors at night and from the construction of a NATO radar station on the summit of Mount Arieiro, and in the longer term climate change may have an adverse effect, since all nests are within 1,000 m (3,300 ft) of the top of the highest mountain in the breeding area. Formerly, shepherds collected nestlings for food, and egg collectors have raided burrows. Currently, the main threats continue to be predation of eggs and chicks by rats, and of nesting adults by feral cats, although at much reduced levels due to trapping.

Zino's petrel is protected under the EU's Wild Birds Directive, and its breeding sites lie within the Parque Natural da Madeira national park. Following the purchase of about 300 hectares (740 acres) of land around the main breeding site, all livestock has been removed from the breeding areas, allowing the vegetation to recover, although breeding still only occurs on ledges that were never accessible to grazing animals. The research and predator control by the Freira Conservation Project and the national park which started in 1986 was expanded in 2001 with additional EU funding. The increase in productivity (29 chicks fledged in 2004) meant that this species was downgraded from critically endangered to endangered on the IUCN Red List in 2004. Its population appeared to be stable or increasing slightly up to the summer of 2010.

A disaster struck the colony on 13 August 2010, when a forest fire swept through the breeding site killing three adults and 25 of the 38 chicks. The fire destroyed the vegetation and several nesting burrows. Conservation action to protect the 13 remaining chicks included removing dead birds and burnt vegetation, reinforcing the surviving nests, and setting poison bait for rats around the now exposed nest sites. The action plan also included the provision of artificial burrows, seed dispersal to help the vegetation recover, and the use of anti-erosion materials. By 2018, the colony had recovered and was stable at 160 adults.
