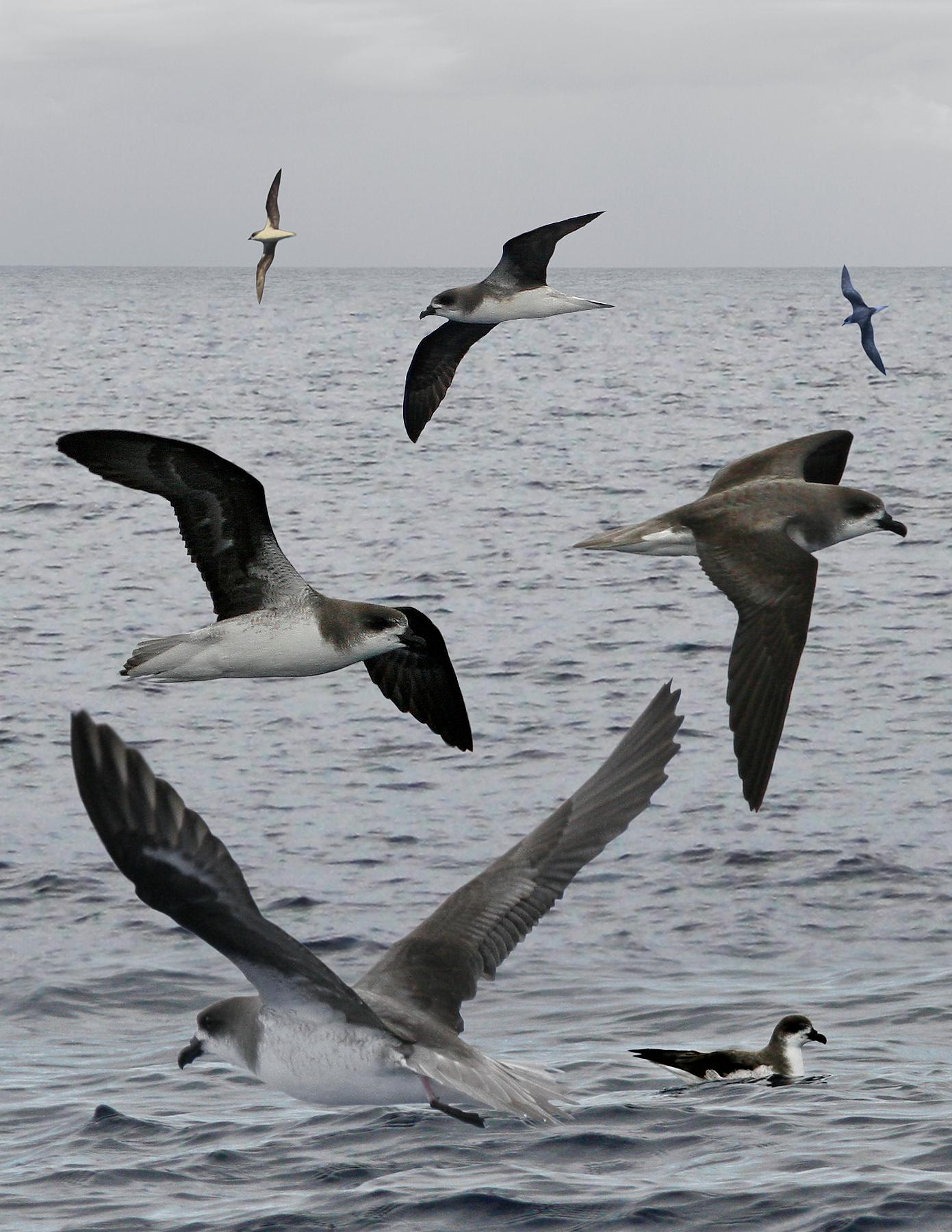

Conservation status
- Near Threatened (IUCN 3.1)

Scientific classification
- Kingdom: Animalia
- Phylum: Chordata
- Class: Aves
- Order: Procellariiformes
- Family: Procellariidae
- Genus: Pterodroma
- Species: P. feae

Binomial name
- Pterodroma feae (Salvadori, 1900)

Synonyms
- Pterodroma mollis feae; Oestrelata feae (Salvadori, 1900)

= Cape Verde petrel =

Species of bird

The Cape Verde petrel (Pterodroma feae), also known as Fea's petrel, is a small seabird in the gadfly petrel genus, Pterodroma. It was previously considered to be a subspecies of the soft-plumaged petrel (P. mollis), but they are actually not closely related at all. However, P. feae is very closely related to Zino's petrel and the Desertas petrel, two other species recently split from P. mollis. The gadfly petrels are named for their speedy weaving flight, as if evading horseflies. The flight action is also reflected in the genus name Pterodroma, from Ancient Greek pteron, "wing" and dromos, " runner". This species is named after the Italian zoologist Leonardo Fea (1852-1903).

== Taxonomy and systematics ==
The first known recording of the "soft-plumaged petrel" appears to have been in October 1768 off the coast of West Africa during Captain Cook's first voyage. While no description was published at the time, a drawing of the specimen produced by Sydney Parkinson can be recognised as the form breeding on the Cape Verde Islands. This specimen was later described as a distinct species by the Italian zoologist Tommaso Salvadori in 1900 with the binomial name Oestrelata feae, named after the Italian ornithologist Leonardo Fea and was later reclassified again as Pterodroma feae.

The gadfly petrels in the genus Pterodroma are seabirds of temperate and tropical oceans. Many are little-known and poorly studied, and their often similar appearance has meant that the taxonomy of the group has been rather fluid. The forms breeding in Macaronesia on Madeira, Bugio in the Desertas Islands, and in the Cape Verde archipelago were long considered to be subspecies of the southern hemisphere soft-plumaged petrel P. mollis, but differences in size, vocalisations, breeding behaviour and mitochondrial DNA analysis showed that the northern birds are not closely related to P. mollis, and that the Bermuda petrel or cahow may be the closest relative of the Macaronesian birds. Sangster recommended establishing Zino's petrel on Madeira and the Cape Verde petrel on the Desertas and Cape Verde as full species, and the species split was accepted by the Association of European Rarities Committees (AERC) in 2003. More recently, some authorities have further split Fea's petrel, separating the Desertas Islands breeding birds from those in the Cape Verde archipelago.

Sangster estimated that the two Macaronesian species diverged at the end of the Early Pleistocene, 850,000 years ago, although the methodology used to establish this time scale has subsequently been questioned. An analysis of feather lice from Fea's petrels Pterodroma feae deserti from Bugio Island and Zino's petrels from the Madeiran mainland showed that there were marked differences between the two seabirds in terms of the parasites they carried, suggesting that they have long been isolated, since lice can normally only be transferred through physical contact in the nest. The species on Zino's petrel are most similar to those of the Bermuda petrel, whereas Fea's petrel's lice are like those of Caribbean and Pacific Pterodromas. This suggests that despite the close physical proximity of the two species of gadfly petrel found in the Madeiran archipelago, they may have arisen from separate colonisations of mainland Madeira and, later, the Desertas Islands.

== Description ==
This long-winged petrel is 33–36 cm in length with an 86–94 cm wingspan. It has a grey back and wings, with a dark "W" marking across the wings. The undersides of the wings are dark and the belly is white. It has a fast impetuous flight. It picks planktonic food items from the ocean surface. This species is very similar to the Zino's petrel, but is larger and has a thicker black bill.

As all three species in the Pterodroma feae/madeira/desertae complex were once believed to be subspecies of a single species: Pterodroma mollis, the extreme difficulty in telling them apart is easily understood. A summary of data from a morphological study sheds light on the issue:

- In overall size feae is closer to deserta and both are bigger than madeira (wing length - f:262, d: 264, m: 248; tarsus - f:34.7, d: 35.2, m: 32.7).
- Bill length once again similar in feae and deserta and both larger than madeira (f:29.0, d: 28.6, m: 26.3).
- Bill depth by far biggest in deserta, lowest in madeira, and intermediate in feae (f:11.9, d: 12.9, m: 10.5).

In terms of ratios:

- (Bill length/wing length) (f:11.1%, d: 10.8%, m: 10.6%) is rather similar in the three taxa.
- (Bill length/bill depth) (f: 2.44, d: 2.22, m: 2.53) is lowest in deserta, and highest in madeira. In feae it is intermediate, but more than twice closer to madeira than to deserta.

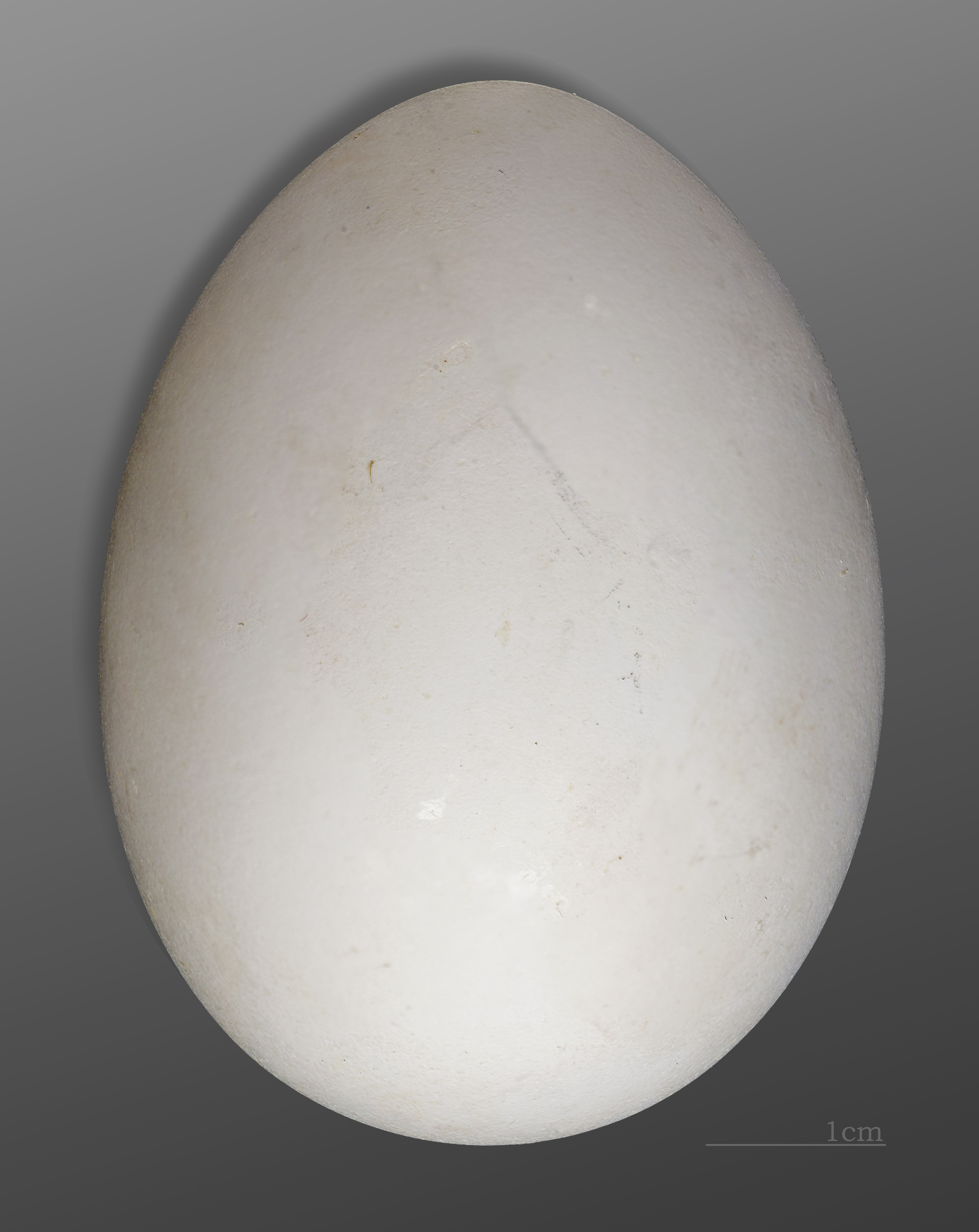
Egg of Fea's petrel (coll.MHNT)

== Distribution and habitat ==
It breeds on four islands of Cape Verde in the eastern Atlantic Ocean: Fogo, Santo Antão, São Nicolau and Santiago.

== Behaviour and ecology ==
=== Breeding ===
This seabird is strictly nocturnal at the breeding sites to avoid predation by gulls. Like most petrels, its walking ability is limited to a short shuffle to the burrow. This endangered species nests in colonies in burrows in spring and autumn. It lays a single white egg.
