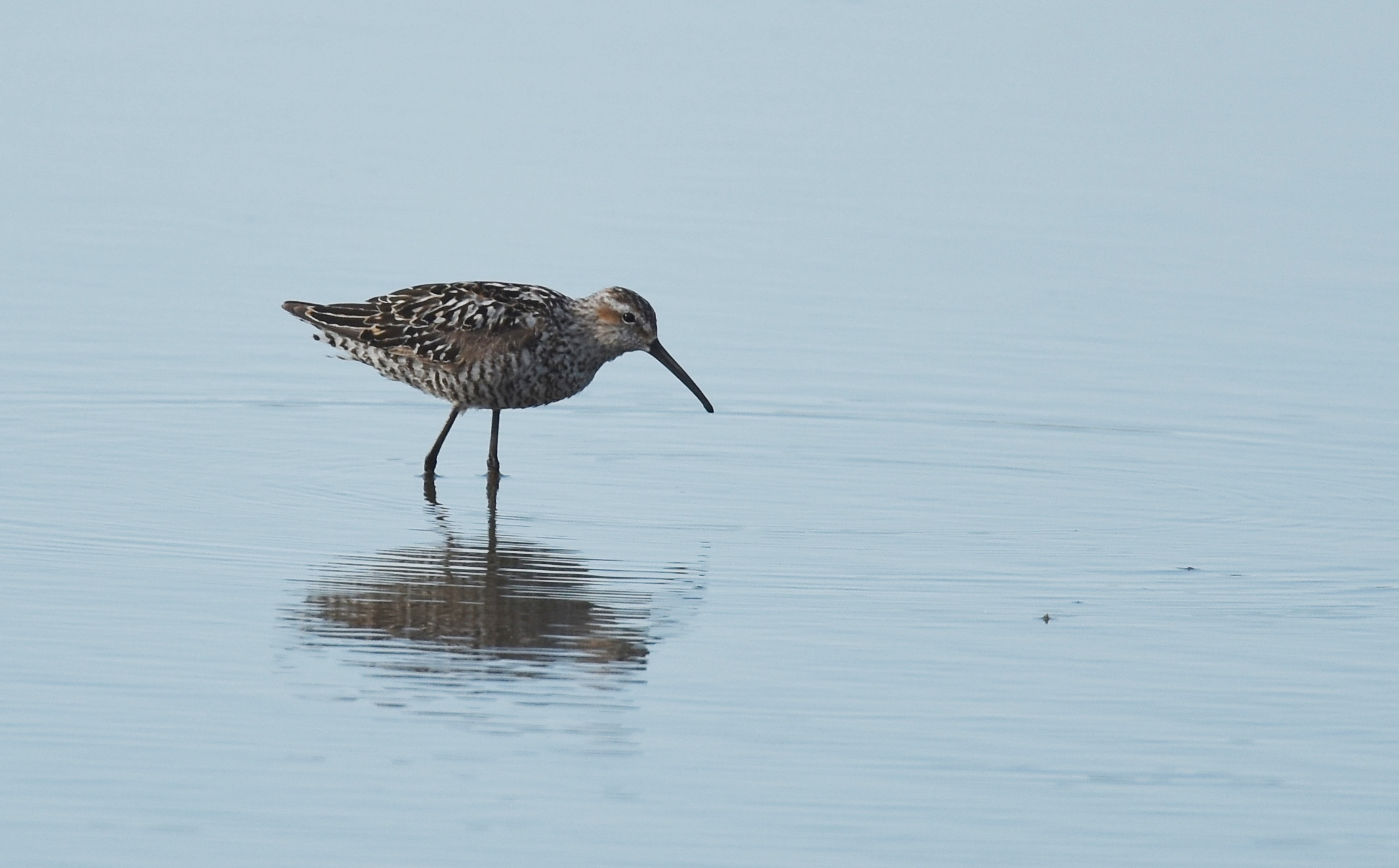

Conservation status
- Near Threatened (IUCN 3.1)

Scientific classification
- Kingdom: Animalia
- Phylum: Chordata
- Class: Aves
- Order: Charadriiformes
- Family: Scolopacidae
- Genus: Calidris
- Species: C. himantopus

Binomial name
- Calidris himantopus (Bonaparte, 1826)
- Breeding Migration Nonbreeding

Synonyms
- Micropalama himantopus

= Stilt sandpiper =

Species of bird

The stilt sandpiper (Calidris himantopus) is a small shorebird. The scientific name is from Ancient Greek; the genus name kalidris or skalidris is a term used by Aristotle for a gray-colored waterside bird. The specific himantopus means "strap foot" or "thong foot", and also refers to the stilt.

== Taxonomy ==
Formerly placed in its own monotypic genus Micropalama, DNA evidence has now shown that it is deeply embedded in the genus Calidris, where its closest relative is the curlew sandpiper, and next closest to a group of four Eurasian species, red-necked stint, spoon-billed sandpiper, Temminck's stint, and long-toed stint. Within the genus Calidris the stilt sandpiper is most closely related to the curlew sandpiper (Calidris ferruginea).

== Description ==
The stilt sandpiper resembles the curlew sandpiper in its long bill, long neck, pale supercilium and white rump. It is readily distinguished from that species by its straighter bill (only slightly curved, not obviously so), its longer and greenish-yellow (not black) legs, and in flight, by the lack of a wingbar. It also lacks an obvious wing bar in flight. Breeding adults are distinctive, heavily barred with blackish bars on a white background beneath, and with reddish-orange patches above and below the white supercilium. The back is brown with darker feather centres. The winter plumage is gray above and white below, and still has a white supercilium. Juveniles resemble the adults in their strong head pattern and brownish back, but they are not barred below, and show white fringes on the back feathering.

Measurements:

- Length: 18–23 cm (7.1–9.1 in)
- Wingspan: 37–42 cm (15–17 in)
- Weight: 50–70 g (1.8–2.5 oz)

== Distribution and habitat ==
The stilt sandpiper breeds in the open arctic tundra of North America in northern Alaska and northern Canada. It is a long-distance migrant, wintering mainly in central South America from southern Peru across to southern Brazil, south to northern Chile and northern Argentina; small numbers also winter further north, in California, Texas, Florida, and Mexico. On migration, flocks stop to rest and feed at the muddy margins of freshwater pools, mainly in the eastern states and provinces of the US and Canada, but also small numbers west to the Pacific coast. It occurs as a rare vagrant in western Europe, Japan and Australia.

== Behaviour and ecology ==
=== Breeding ===
The stilt sandpiper nests on the ground, laying three or four eggs. The male has a display flight. Outside the breeding season, this bird is normally found on inland waters, rather than open coasts.

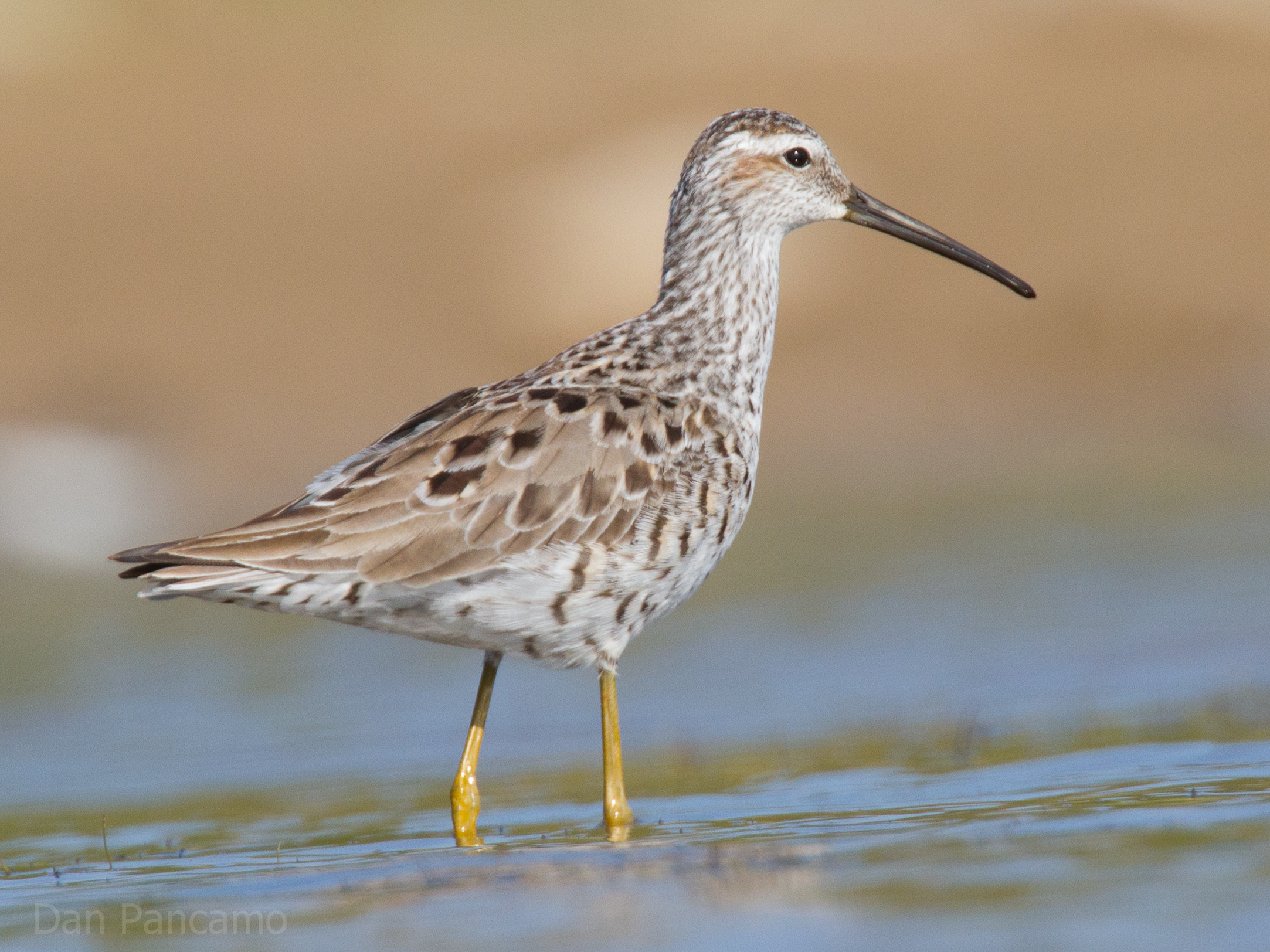
Stilt sandpiper in Quintana, Texas

=== Food and feeding ===
It forages on muddy pool margins, picking up food by sight, often jabbing like the dowitchers with which it often associates. They mainly eat insects, other invertebrates (such as molluscs), seeds, and the leaves and roots of aquatic plants.
