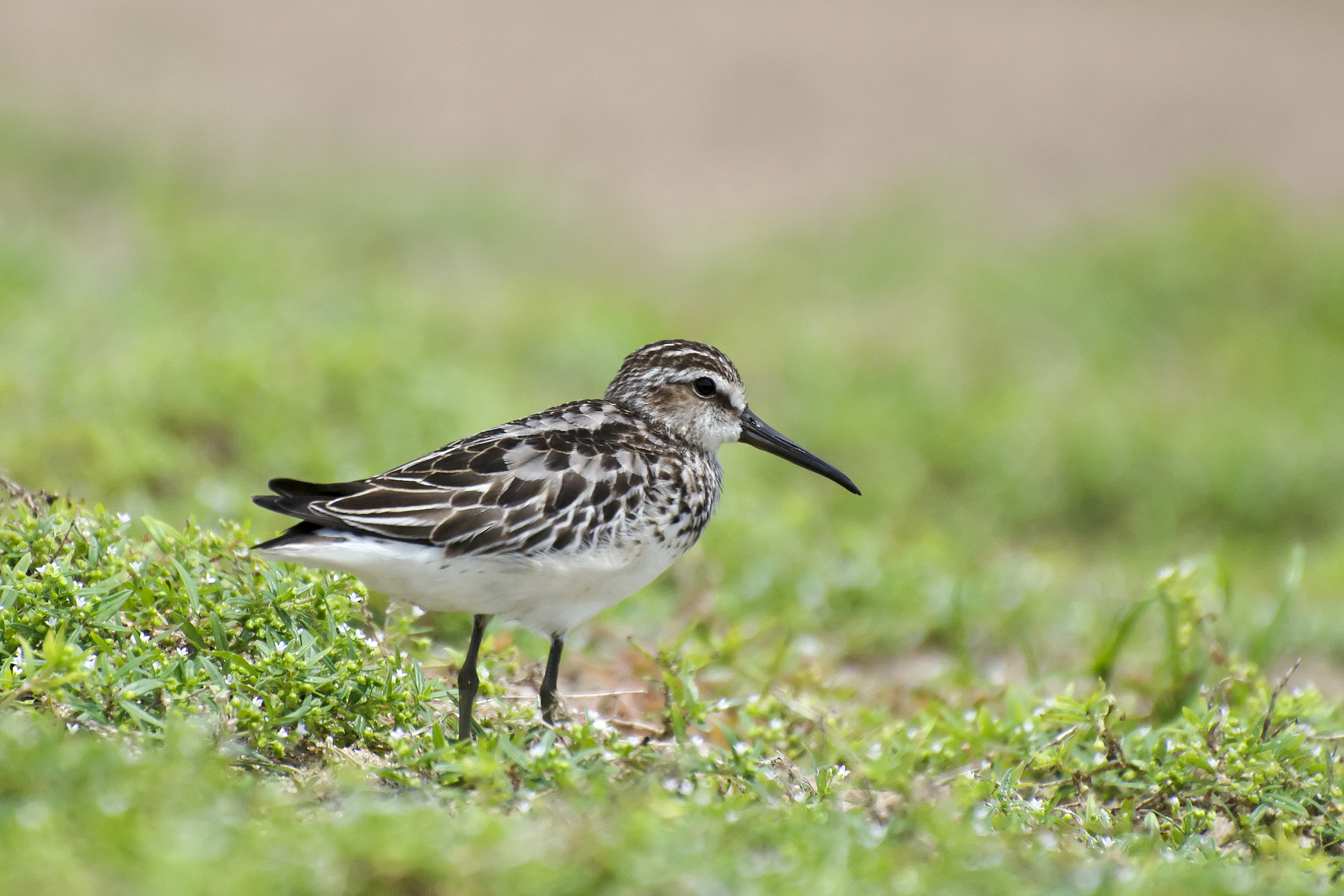
- C. f. falcinellus adult in autumn starting moult to winter plumage, Kerala, India

Conservation status
- Vulnerable (IUCN 3.1)

Scientific classification
- Kingdom: Animalia
- Phylum: Chordata
- Class: Aves
- Order: Charadriiformes
- Family: Scolopacidae
- Genus: Calidris
- Species: C. falcinellus

Binomial name
- Calidris falcinellus (Pontoppidan, 1763)
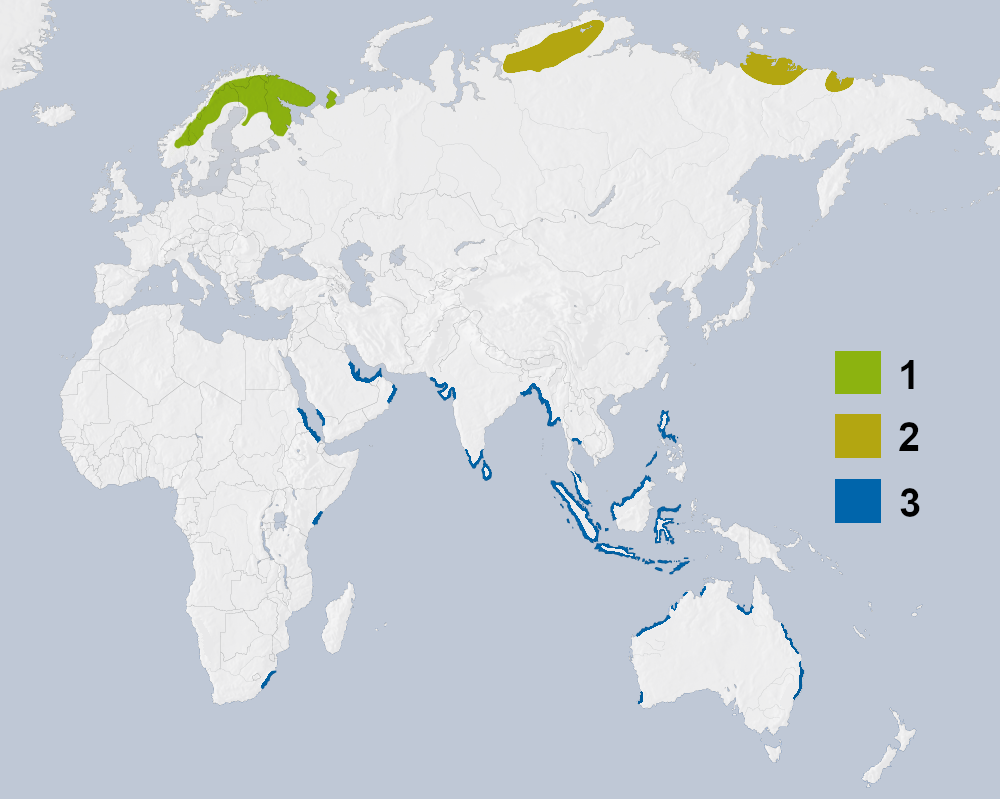
- 1. C. f. falcinellus breeding range 2. C. f. sibirica breeding range 3. Wintering range

Synonyms
- Limicola falcinellus

= Broad-billed sandpiper =

Species of bird

The broad-billed sandpiper (Calidris falcinellus) is a small wader. The scientific specific name falcinellus is the diminutive from Latin falx, falcis, "a small sickle". It was formerly treated in its own monospecific genus Limicola, but this was found to be embedded within the wider genus Calidris, into which it was transferred in 2004.

Within the genus Calidris, the broad-billed sandpiper is most closely related to the sharp-tailed sandpiper (C. acuminata).

The two subspecies are:

- C. f. falcinellus – breeds northern Scandinavia, northwest Russia; winters east Africa, Middle East, India
- C. f. sibirica – breeds central and eastern Siberia; winters southeast Asia

== Description ==
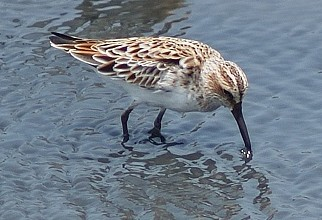
Adult C. f. sibirica on spring migration, Taiwan

Broad-billed sandpipers are small waders, 16–18 cm long, slightly smaller than the dunlin, but larger than the little stint; it has a longer, straighter bill with the tip distinctly kinked down, and shorter legs than dunlin. The breeding adult has dark brown upperparts patterned with narrow, pale feather fringes, and white underparts with blackish markings on the breast. It has a pale crown stripe, and a distinctive double (split) supercilium. As its English name suggests, the bill is slightly broader than in most other Calidris species, but this "museum" name characteristic is rarely evident in the field. The two subspecies differ in the summer plumage feather fringing, narrow and white in C. f. falcinellus, brighter and rufous-toned in C. f. sibirica.

The winter plumage is much paler and greyer above and white below, like a winter dunlin, but retains the distinct head pattern. Juveniles have backs similar to a young dunlin or little stint with pale "tramlines" down the mantle, but the white flanks and belly and brown-streaked breast are distinctive.

The contact call is a dry, whistling dree-it, dree-it and a clicking dik dik, similar to the little stint.

== Distribution and habitat ==
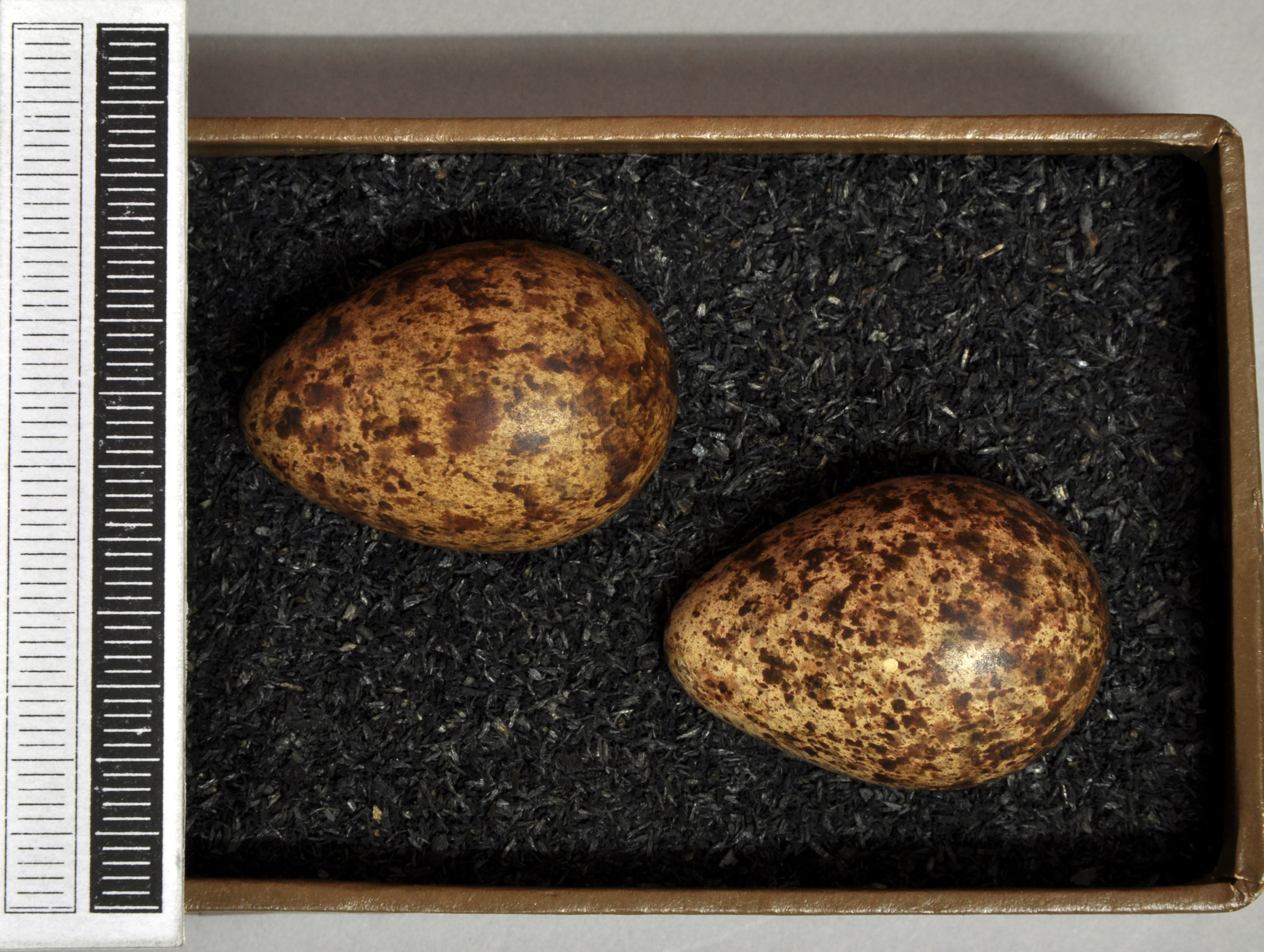
Eggs in the Museum Wiesbaden collection

The broad-billed sandpiper is strongly migratory, spending the non-breeding season from easternmost Africa, through south and south-east Asia to Australasia. It is gregarious, and forms flocks with other scolopacid waders, particularly dunlins. Despite its European breeding range, this species is rare on passage in western Europe, due to its south-easterly migration route.

This bird's breeding habitat is wet taiga bogs in Arctic northern Scandinavia and Siberia, in two disjunct regions, representing the two subspecies. The male performs an aerial display during courtship. The pairs nest in a ground scrape, laying four eggs.

They forage in soft mud on marshes in the summer and on coasts in winter, mainly picking up food by sight. They mostly eat insects and other small invertebrates.

== Status ==
This species has a wide distribution range and a large population, but the global population trends show signs of decline, which likely exceed 30% in the past three generations, so the International Union for Conservation of Nature and Natural Resources classified this species as "vulnerable".

The broad-billed sandpiper is one of the species to which the Agreement on the Conservation of African-Eurasian Migratory Waterbirds applies.
