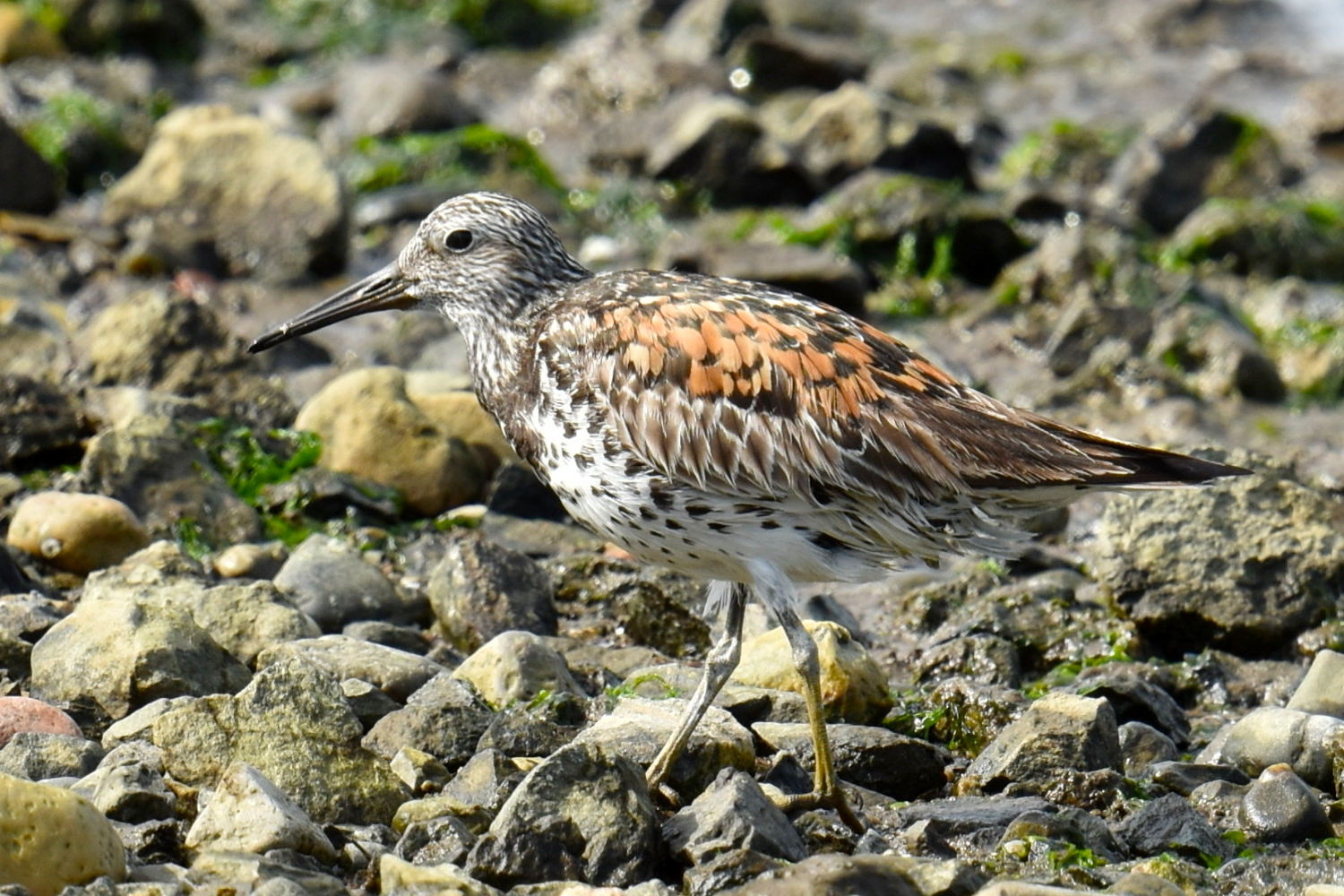
- Breeding plumage, Primorsky Krai, Russia
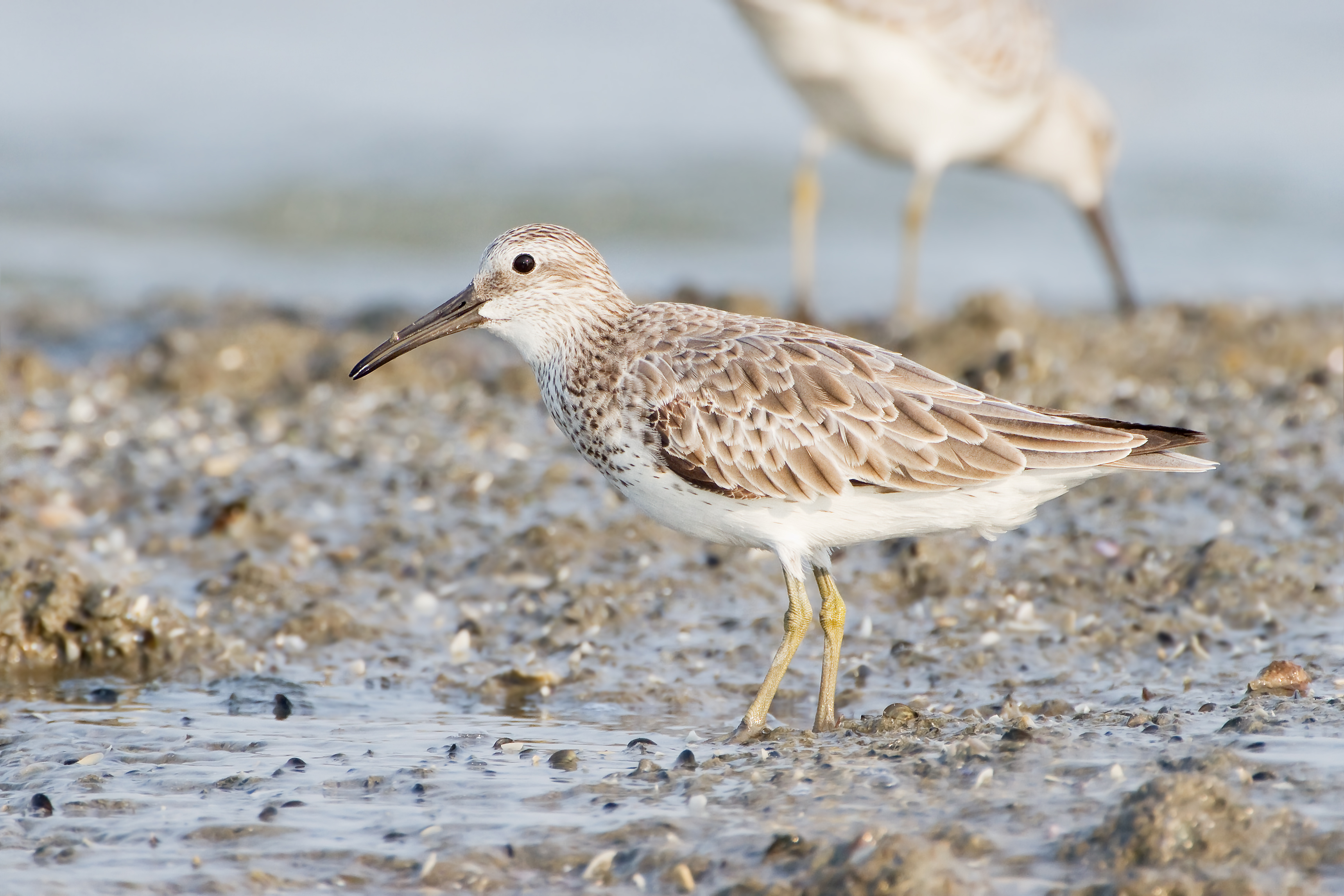
- Winter plumage, Thailand

Conservation status
- Endangered (IUCN 3.1)

- Critically endangered (EPBC Act)

Scientific classification
- Kingdom: Animalia
- Phylum: Chordata
- Class: Aves
- Order: Charadriiformes
- Family: Scolopacidae
- Genus: Calidris
- Species: C. tenuirostris

Binomial name
- Calidris tenuirostris (Horsfield, 1821)

= Great knot =

Species of bird

The great knot (Calidris tenuirostris) is a medium-sized wader. It is one of the largest species in the genus Calidris. It is a migratory bird which breeds in eastern Siberia, Russia, and flies to southern Asia and Australia in the northern winter.

== Taxonomy ==
Within the genus Calidris the great knot is most closely related to the surfbird (Calidris virgata).

The genus name is from Ancient Greek kalidris or skalidris, a term used by Aristotle for some grey-coloured waterside birds. The specific tenuirostris is from Latin tenuis "slender" and rostrum "bill".

== Distribution ==
Their breeding habitat is tundra in northeast Siberia, Russia. They nest on the ground laying about four eggs in a ground scrape. They are strongly migratory wintering on coasts in southern Asia through to Australia. This species forms enormous flocks in winter.

The species is also recorded in summer in low numbers in western Alaska, United States in most years, and in winter in small numbers west to Pakistan, Oman, and the United Arab Emirates. It has occurred as a vagrant in Great Britain, Morocco, New Zealand, British Columbia in Canada, and in the lower 48 states of the USA in Oregon, West Virginia, and Maine.

== Taxonomy and description ==
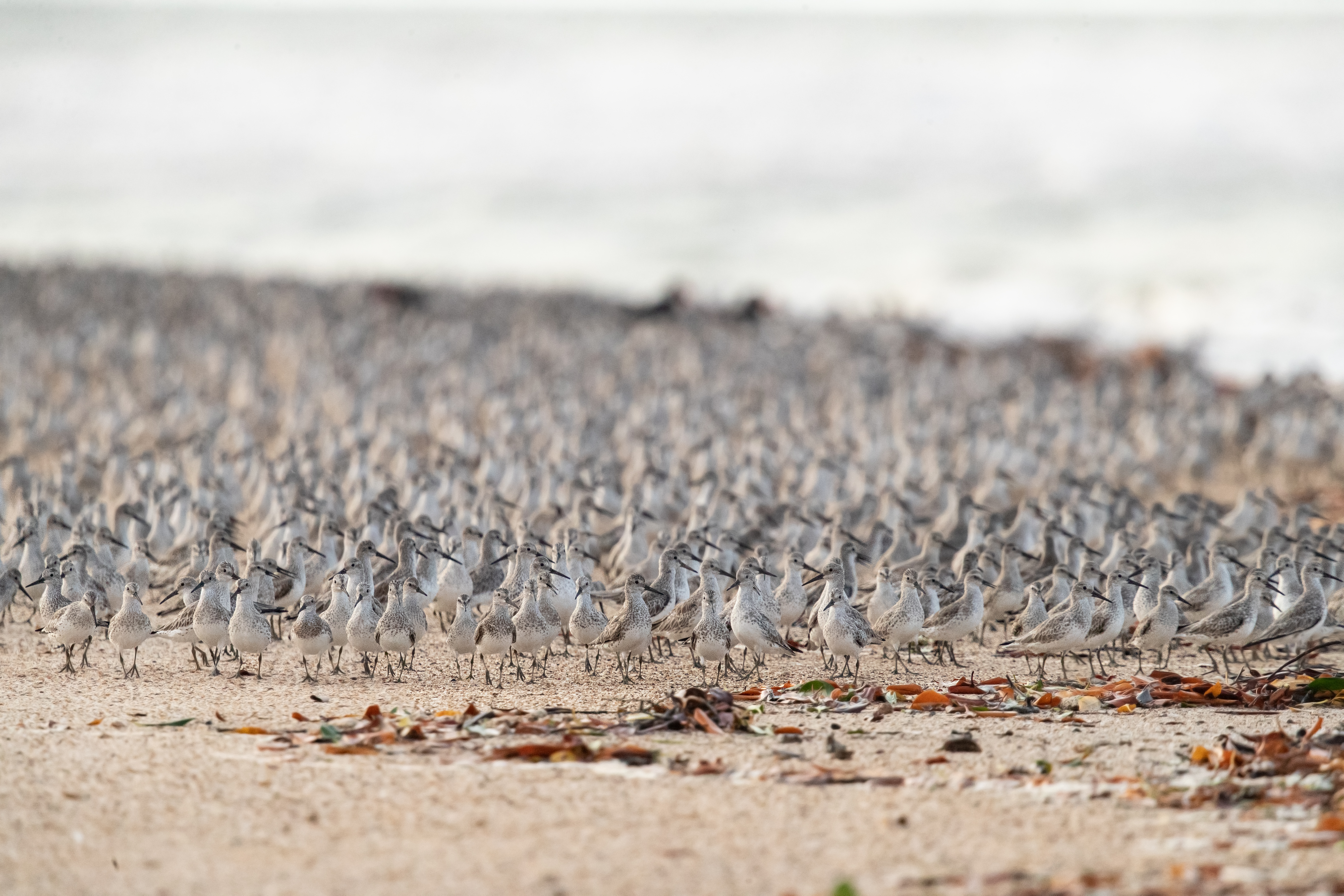
Great knots at Lee Point, Darwin, Northern Territory, Australia

Manly Marina, SE Queensland, Australia

Calidris tenuirostris, commonly known as the great knot, is one of the largest species of the genus Calidris, in the family Scolopacidae. The ruff C. pugnax, with its marked sexual dimorphism in size, can have larger males, but its females are much smaller. Its sister species, the surfbird C. virgata and red knot C. canutus, are the next largest. Adult great knots can measure 26 to 30 cm (10 to 12 in), with a wingspan of 56 to 66 cm (22 to 26 in), and weighing 115 to 261 g (4.1 to 9.2 oz).

This species has short dark legs and a medium-length thin dark bill. Breeding adults have mottled greyish upper parts, with a distinct band of rufous feathering on the scapular feathers. The face, throat and breast are heavily spotted black, and there are also some streaks on the rear belly. In winter the plumage becomes uniformly pale grey above.

It is distinguished from the red knot by its breeding plumage, in which the latter has a distinctive red face, throat and breast. In other plumages, the great knot can be identified by its larger size, longer bill, deeper chest, and the more streaked upper parts.

== Behaviour ==
These birds forage on mudflats and beaches, probing or picking up food by sight. They mainly eat molluscs and insects.

== Conservation status ==
The great knot is one of the species to which the Agreement on the Conservation of African-Eurasian Migratory Waterbirds (AEWA) applies.

=== Australia ===
Since 5 May 2016 and as of August 2023, the great knot is listed as critically endangered in Australia under the federal Environment Protection and Biodiversity Conservation Act 1999 (EPBC Act), with the next assessment due on 30 October 2023. A study published in Biological Conservation in March 2023 listed 23 species which the authors considered to no longer meet the criteria as threatened species under the EPBC Act, including the great knot. The reason for the assessment was "Populations now stable or declining at a rate less than threshold".

Under state and territory legislation, the species is as of August 2023 listed as vulnerable in New South Wales and the Northern Territory; endangered in South Australia; and critically endangered in Queensland, Victoria, and Western Australia.
