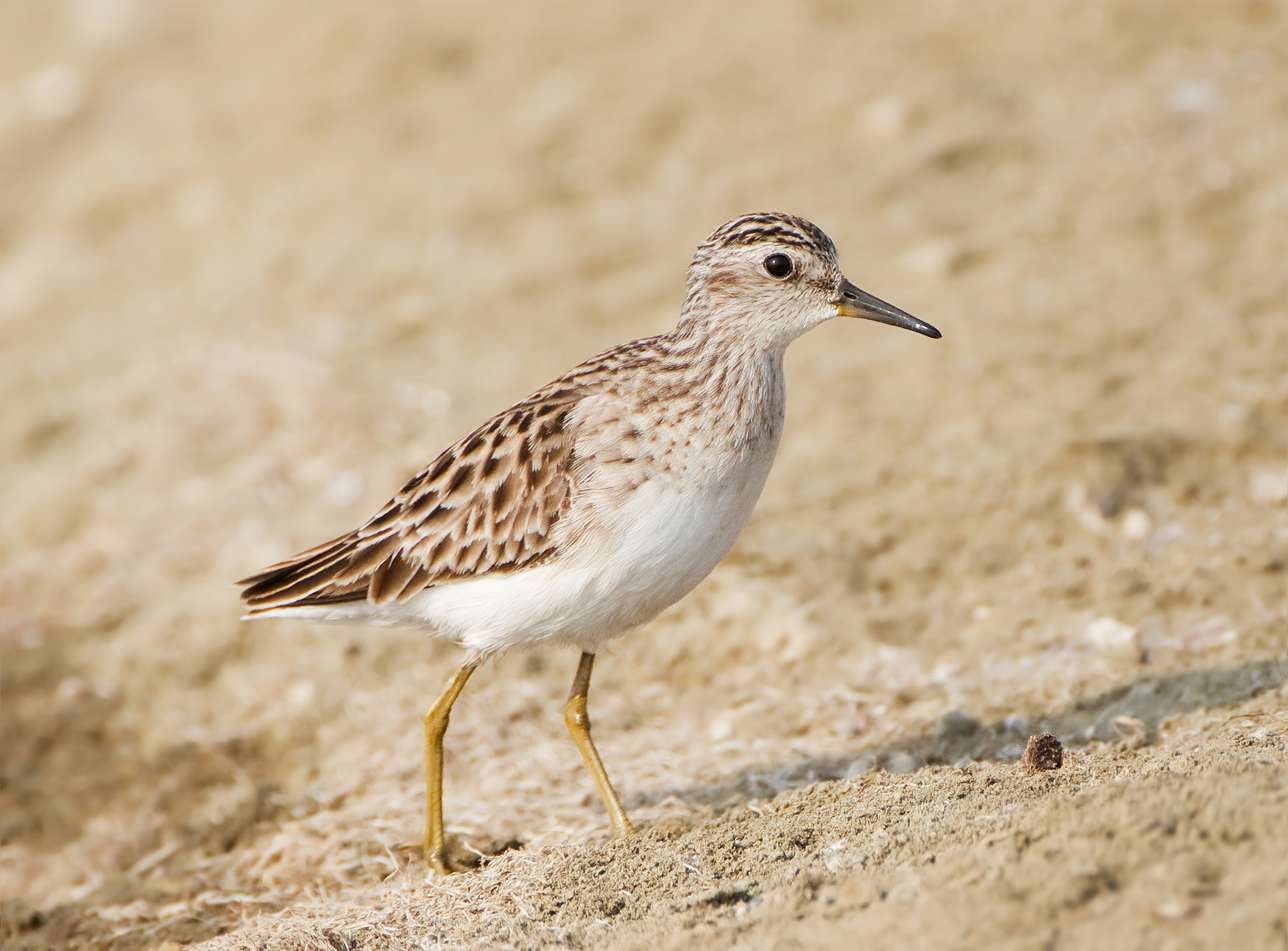

Conservation status
- Least Concern (IUCN 3.1)

Scientific classification
- Kingdom: Animalia
- Phylum: Chordata
- Class: Aves
- Order: Charadriiformes
- Family: Scolopacidae
- Genus: Calidris
- Species: C. subminuta

Binomial name
- Calidris subminuta (Middendorff, 1853)

Synonyms
- Erolia subminuta

= Long-toed stint =

Species of bird

The long-toed stint (Calidris subminuta) is a small wader. The genus name is from Ancient Greek kalidris or skalidris, a term used by Aristotle for some grey-coloured waterside birds. The specific subminuta is from Latin sub, "near to" and minuta, "small" from its similarity to the little stint, Calidris minuta.

Within the genus Calidris the long-toed stint is most closely related to Temminck's stint (Calidris temminckii).

It breeds across northern Asia and is strongly migratory, wintering in south and south east Asia and Australasia. It occurs in western Europe only as a very rare vagrant.

This bird has yellowish legs and a short thin dark bill. Breeding adults are a rich brown with darker feather centres above and white underneath. They have a light line above the eye and a brown crown. In winter, long-toed stints are grey above. The juveniles are brightly patterned above with rufous colouration and white mantle stripes.

This bird can be difficult to distinguish from other similar tiny waders which are known collectively as "peeps" or "stints". In particular, the long-toed stint is very similar to its North American counterpart, the least sandpiper. It differs from that species in its more slender, longer-necked appearance, longer toes, somewhat brighter colours, and weaker wingbar.

These birds forage on mudflats, picking up food by sight, sometimes by probing. They mainly eat small crustaceans, insects and snails. Little is known of the breeding habits of this species, although it nests on the ground, and the male has a display flight.

== Description ==
The long-toed stint is a very small wader measuring just 13 to 16 cm (5.1 to 6.3 in) in length with a wingspan of 26.5 to 30.5 cm (10.4 to 12.0 in). It weighs about 25 g (0.9 oz). It has a small head and short, straight sharp-tipped beak. The neck is slender, the belly rounded and the long legs are set well back. The toes are long and slender, especially the middle one. The primary feathers extend as far as the tail. The crown is brown and there is a pale streak just above the eye. The upper parts are brown with the centres of the feathers darker brown. The breast is speckled with pale brown and the underparts are white. The legs and feet are yellow and the beak dark brown, apart from the base of the lower mandible which is yellow or pale brown.

This bird has a distinctive stance and its flight call distinguishes it from other sandpipers. On the ground it can be confused with the red-necked stint (Calidris ruficollis) but is more finely built and slightly smaller.

== Distribution and habitat ==
The long-toed stint breeds in Siberia during the Northern Hemisphere summer. Little is known of its breeding habits but its breeding range includes the Chukchi Peninsula, the Koryak Plateau, the Commander Islands, the Kuril Islands, land bordering the Sea of Okhotsk, north Verkhoyansky District and around the Ob River and the Irtysh River. After the breeding season it migrates southwards passing through China, Indochina, Malaysia and the Philippines and westwards to Burma, Bangladesh, Nepal, Sri Lanka and the Maldive Islands. It is a winter (Northern Hemisphere winter) visitor to New Guinea and Australia and a vagrant to Great Britain, Sweden, South Africa, Melanesia, Hawaii, the northwestern USA and the vicinity of the Bering Sea. In its overwintering range it visits a variety of wetland habitats including shallow freshwater or brackish areas, lakes, swamps, floodplains, marshes, lagoons, muddy shores and sewage ponds.

== Behaviour ==
The long-toed stint forages in wet habitats, probing the ground with its beak. It feeds on molluscs, crustaceans, amphibians, insects, other invertebrates and seeds. It roosts in hollows in soft mud or in low vegetation bordering its feeding area. In its breeding range in Russia its habitat is tundra, taiga, open grassy bogs or swamps. The nesting site tends to be in an area with mosses, sedges and dwarf willows and is typically a well-hidden, shallow depression on a mound of sedge or dried grass.

== Status ==
The long-toed stint has a very wide range and it is estimated that there are somewhere between 10,000 and 100,000 individuals globally. There may be in the region of 25,000 breeding pairs. The population trend is unknown but the IUCN has listed the bird as being of least concern. No particular threats have been identified.
