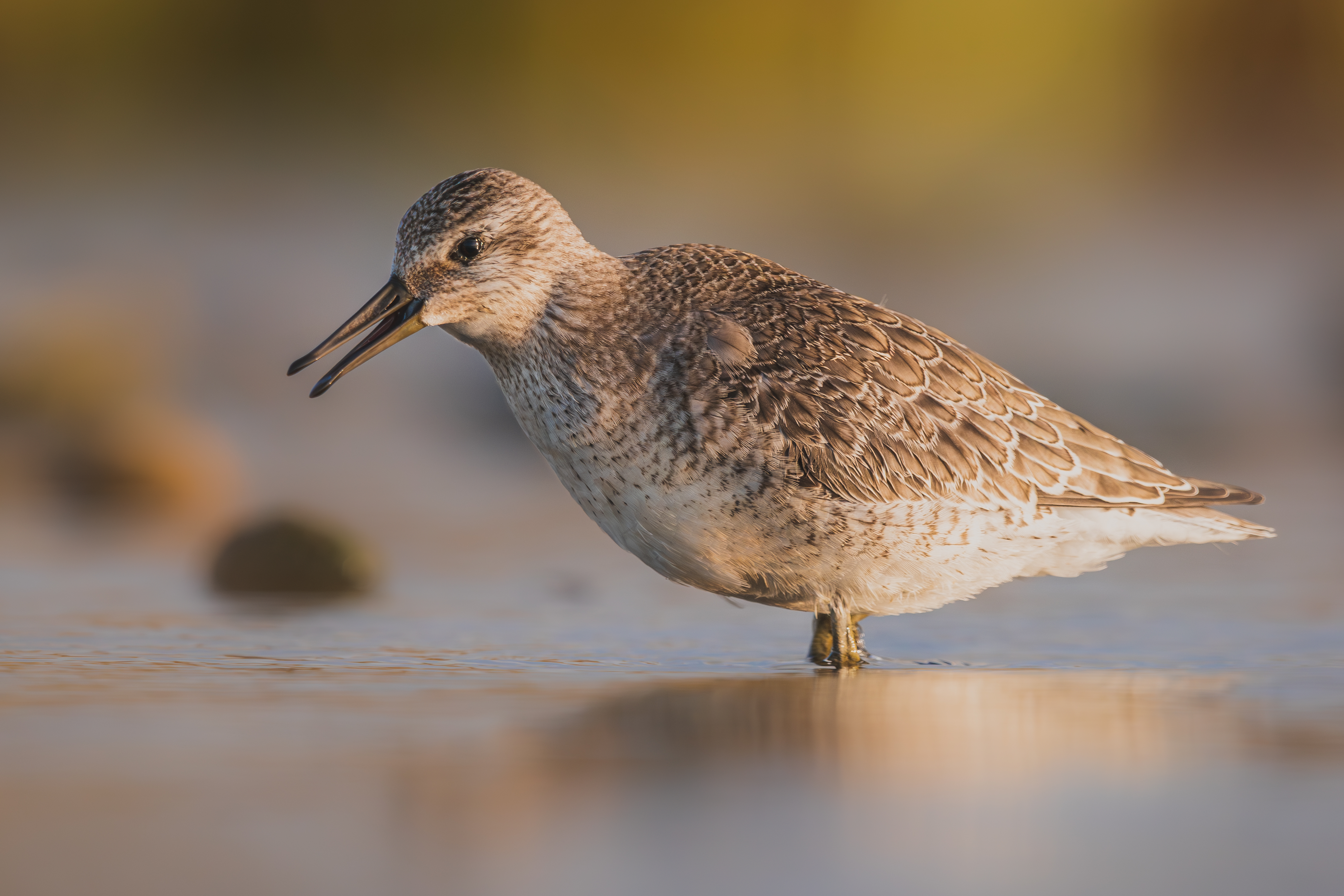
- Red knot (Calidris canutus) in juvenile plumage, Brittany, France

Scientific classification
- Kingdom: Animalia
- Phylum: Chordata
- Class: Aves
- Order: Charadriiformes
- Family: Scolopacidae
- Genus: Calidris; Merrem, 1804

Type species
- Tringa calidris = Tringa canutus Gmelin, 1789

Synonyms
- Philomachus Merrem, 1804; Ereunetes Illiger, 1811; Erolia Vieillot, 1816; Limicola Koch, 1816; Machetes Cuvier, 1817; Eurynorhynchus Nilsson, 1821; Crocethia Billberg, 1828; Canutus Brehm, 1831; Aphriza Audubon, 1839; Tryngites Cabanis, 1857; Micropalama Baird, 1858

= Calidris =

Genus of birds

Calidris is a genus of Arctic-breeding, strongly migratory wading birds in the family Scolopacidae. These birds form huge mixed flocks on coasts and estuaries in winter. They are small to medium-sized sandpipers, long-winged and relatively short-billed; some are difficult to identify because of the similarity between species, and various breeding, non-breeding, juvenile, and moulting plumages. With a few exceptions, they have a fairly stereotypical colour pattern, being brownish above and lighter, usually white or buffy coloured, on much of the underside. They often have a lighter supercilium above brownish cheeks. The species are variously known in English as sandpipers or (particularly the smaller species) stints; some have their own unique names, with dunlin (a mediaeval name meaning "[small] brown bird"), knot (imitative of its call), ruff (named after its male display plumage), and sanderling and surfbird (named after their habitat and behaviour). In North America, the smaller species are often known colloquially as peeps.

Their bills are flexible, able to exhibit rhynchokinesis, and have sensitive tips which contain numerous corpuscles of Herbst. This enables the birds to locate buried prey items, which they typically seek with restless running and probing. Migratory shorebirds are shown to have declined in reproductive traits because of temporal changes of their breeding seasons.

== Taxonomy ==
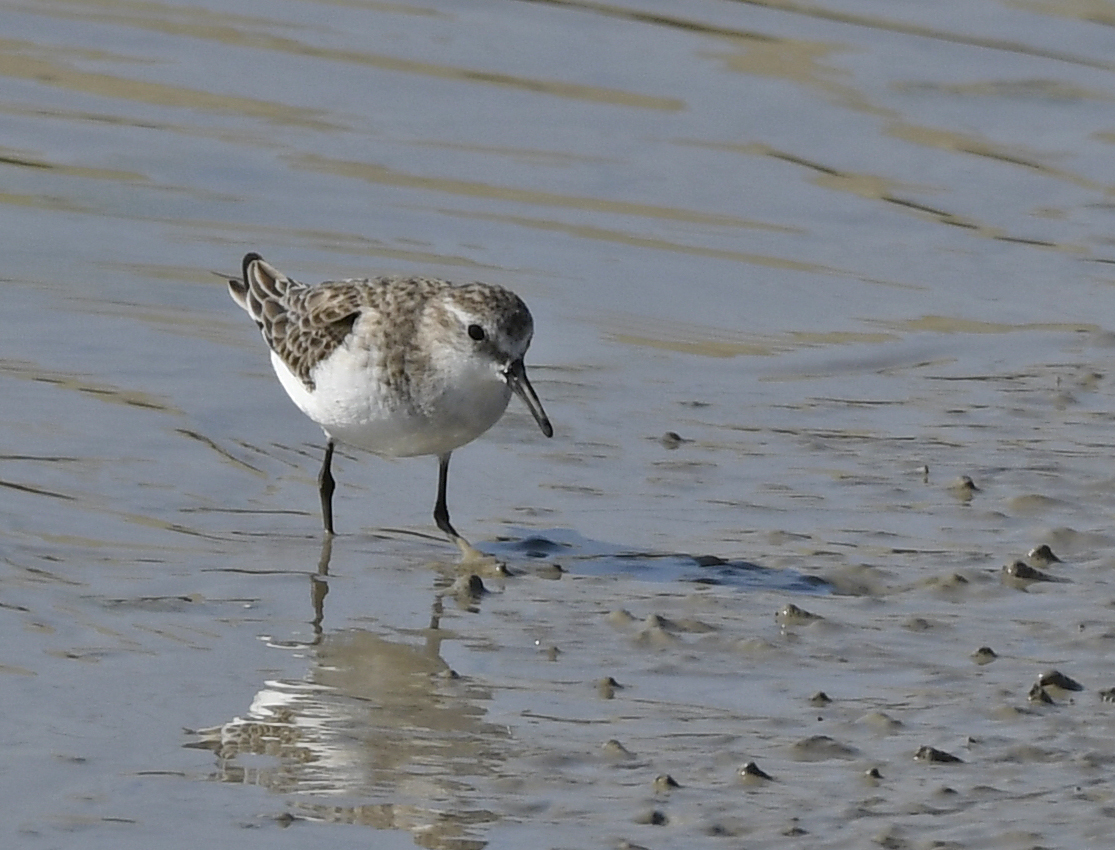
Little Stint at Jamnagar, India

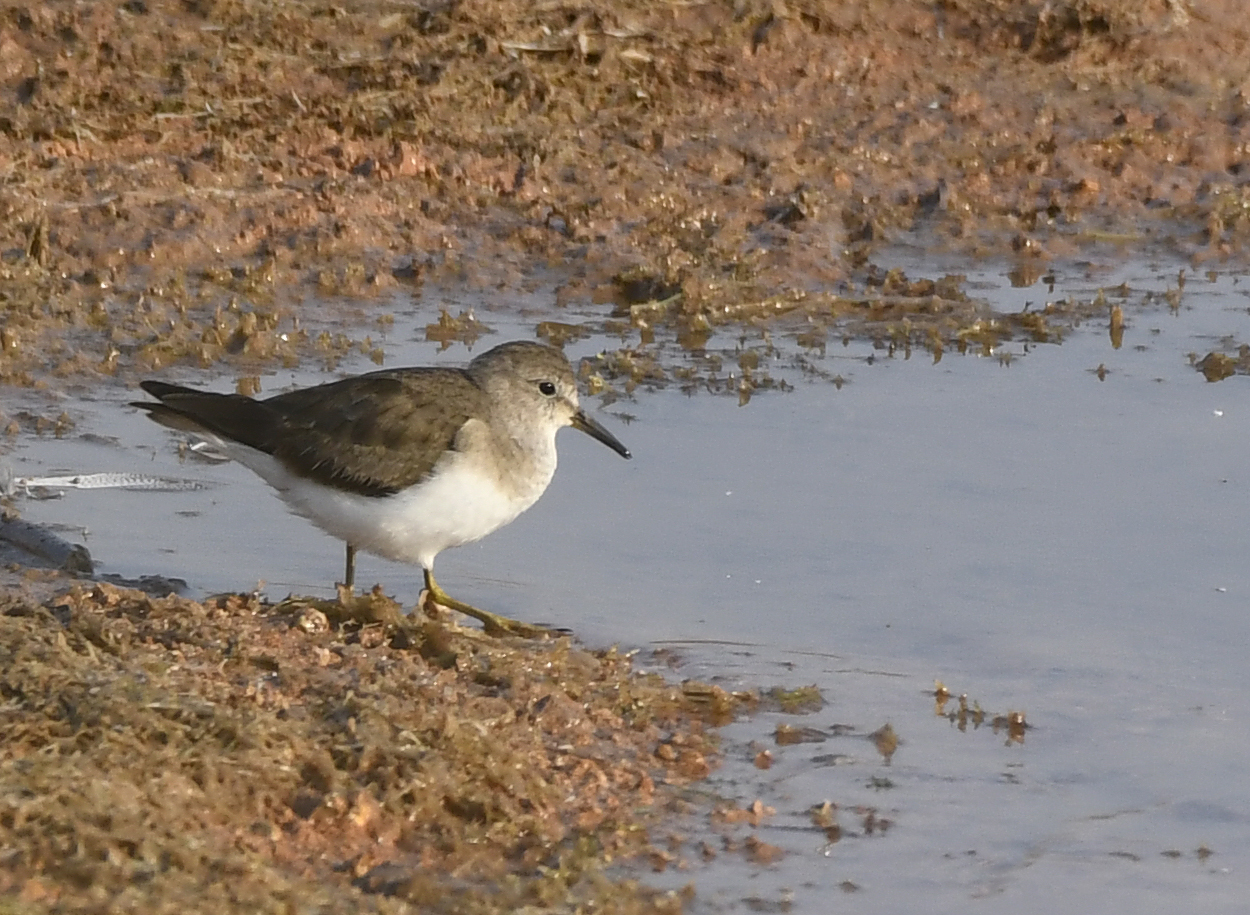
Temminck's stint at Jamnagar, India

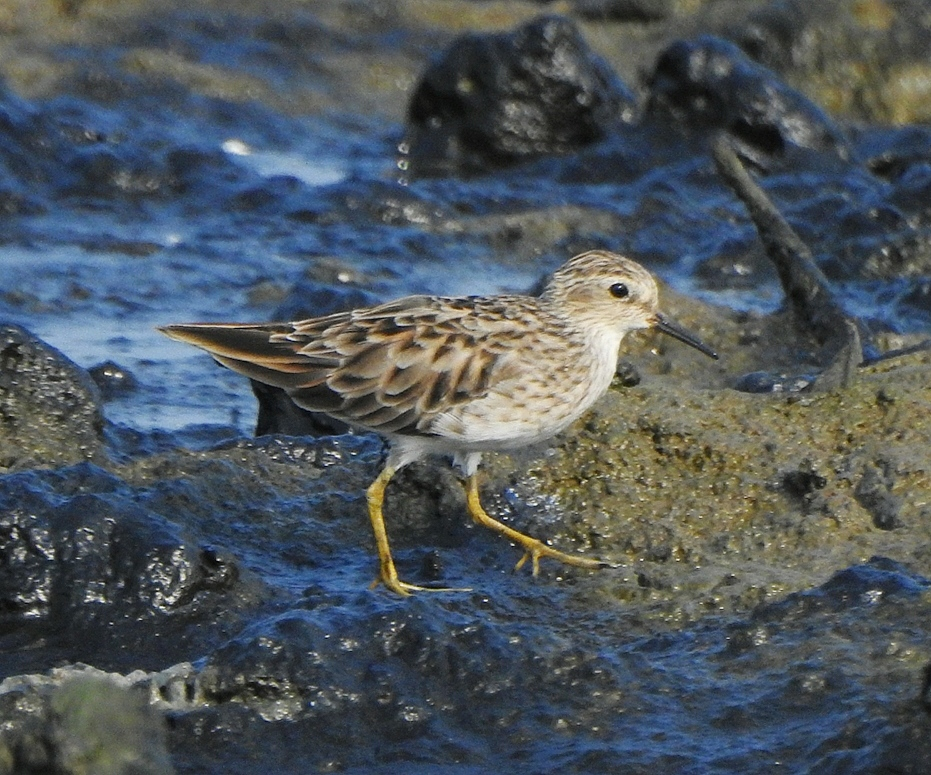
Long-toed stint (Calidris subminuta) in Kerala

The genus Calidris was introduced in 1804 by the German naturalist Blasius Merrem with the red knot as the type species. The genus name is from Ancient Greek kalidris or skalidris, a term used by Aristotle for an unidentified grey-coloured waterside bird.

Many of the species have been treated under other generic names at various times in the past, but these treatments leave Calidris polyphyletic; synonyms are in brackets in the list below.

The genus contain 24 species:

- Red knot Calidris canutus
- Great knot Calidris tenuirostris
- Surfbird Calidris virgata (syn. Aphriza virgata)
- Ruff Calidris pugnax (syn. Philomachus pugnax)
- Sharp-tailed sandpiper Calidris acuminata
- Broad-billed sandpiper Calidris falcinellus (syn. Limicola falcinellus)
- Curlew sandpiper Calidris ferruginea (syn. Erolia ferruginea)
- Stilt sandpiper Calidris himantopus (syn. Micropalama himantopus)
- Spoon-billed sandpiper Calidris pygmaea (syn. Eurynorhynchus pygmaeus)
- Red-necked stint Calidris ruficollis
- Temminck's stint Calidris temminckii
- Long-toed stint Calidris subminuta
- Buff-breasted sandpiper Calidris subruficollis (syn. Tryngites subruficollis)
- Sanderling Calidris alba (syn. Crocethia alba)
- Dunlin Calidris alpina
- Purple sandpiper Calidris maritima
- Rock sandpiper Calidris ptilocnemis
- Baird's sandpiper Calidris bairdii
- Pectoral sandpiper Calidris melanotos
- Semipalmated sandpiper Calidris pusilla (syn. Ereunetes pusillus)
- Western sandpiper Calidris mauri
- Little stint Calidris minuta
- Least sandpiper Calidris minutilla
- White-rumped sandpiper Calidris fuscicollis

The following species-level cladogram is based on a molecular phylogenetic study by David Černý and Rossy Natale that was published in 2022. Some of the nodes are only weakly supported by the sequence data.

- Calidris
  - - Red knot – Calidris canutus
    - - Great knot – Calidris tenuirostris
      - Surfbird – Calidris virgata
  - - Ruff – Calidris pugnax
    - - - Sharp-tailed sandpiper – Calidris acuminata
        - Broad-billed sandpiper – Calidris falcinellus
      - - - - Curlew sandpiper – Calidris ferruginea
            - Stilt sandpiper – Calidris himantopus
          - - - Spoon-billed sandpiper – Calidris pygmaea
              - Red-necked stint – Calidris ruficollis
            - - Long-toed stint – Calidris subminuta
              - Temminck's stint – Calidris temminckii
        - - Buff-breasted sandpiper – Calidris subruficollis
          - - - Sanderling – Calidris alba
              - - Dunlin – Calidris alpina
                - - Purple sandpiper – Calidris maritima
                  - Rock sandpiper – Calidris ptilocnemis
            - - Baird's sandpiper – Calidris bairdii
              - - - Little stint – Calidris minuta
                  - - White-rumped sandpiper – Calidris fuscicollis
                    - Least sandpiper – Calidris minutilla
                - - Pectoral sandpiper – Calidris melanotos
                  - - Western sandpiper – Calidris mauri
                    - Semipalmated sandpiper – Calidris pusilla

== Hybrids ==
Several hybrids have been discovered between different species in the genus. See Hybridisation in shorebirds for further details.
