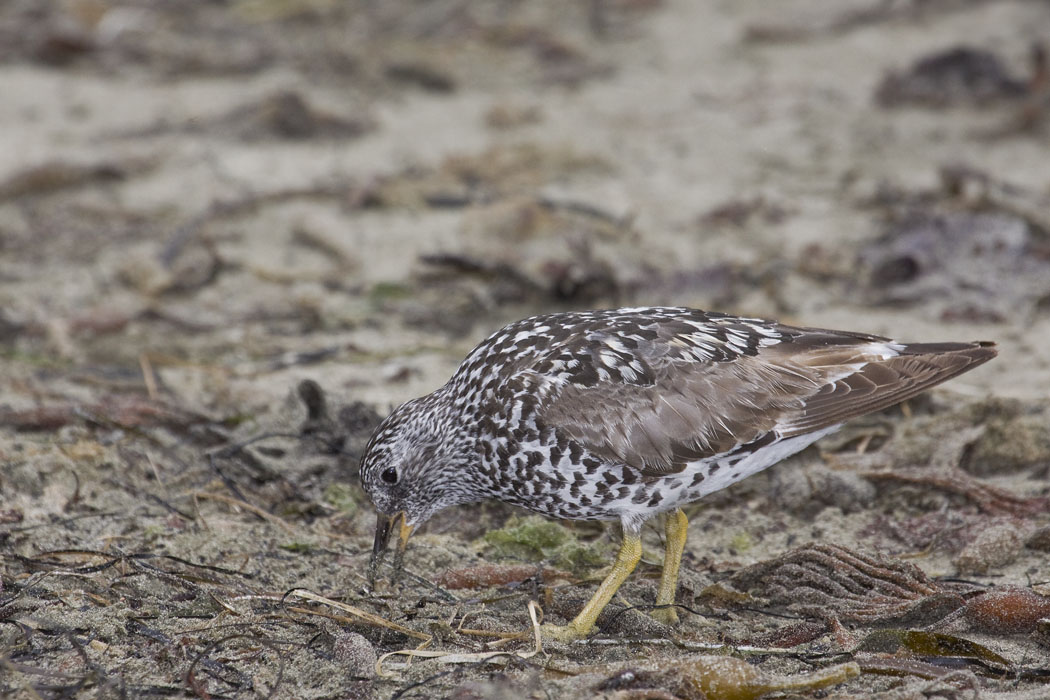

Conservation status
- Least Concern (IUCN 3.1)

Scientific classification
- Kingdom: Animalia
- Phylum: Chordata
- Class: Aves
- Order: Charadriiformes
- Family: Scolopacidae
- Genus: Calidris
- Species: C. virgata

Binomial name
- Calidris virgata (Gmelin, JF, 1789)
- Breeding Nonbreeding

Synonyms
- Aphriza virgata

= Surfbird =

Species of bird

The surfbird (Calidris virgata) is a small stocky wader in the family Scolopacidae. It was once considered to be allied to the turnstones, and placed in the monotypic genus Aphriza, but is now placed in the genus Calidris.

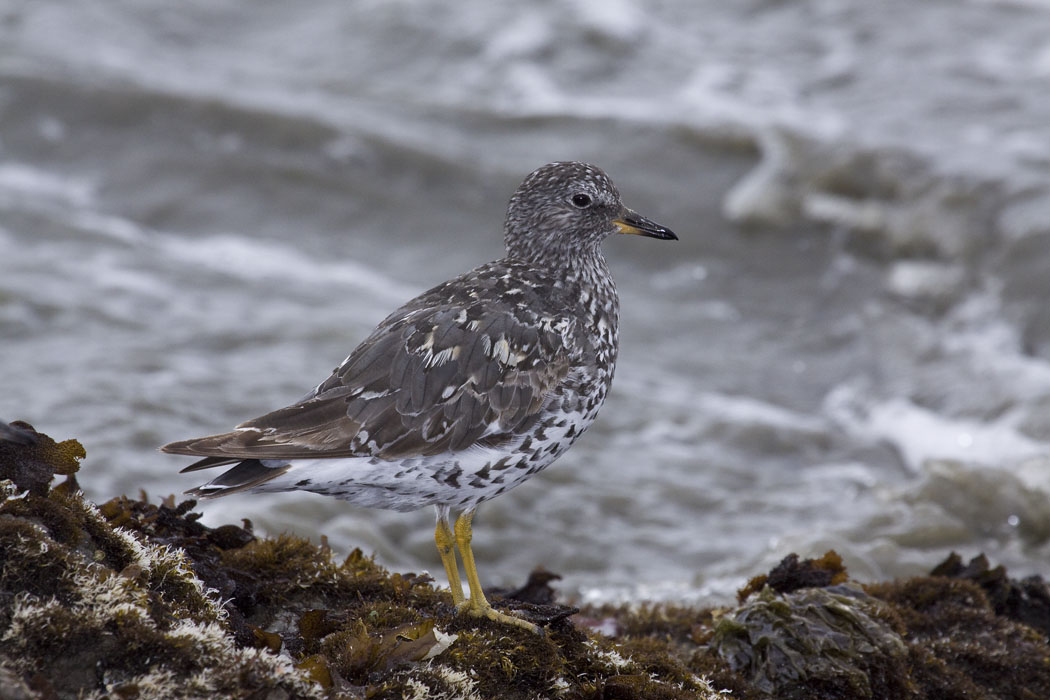
In worn breeding plumage

This bird has a short dark bill, yellow legs and a black band at the end of the white rump. In breeding plumage, it has dark streaks on the brownish head and breast with dark spots on its white underparts; the upperparts are dark with flax or sometimes rust colouring on the wings. Birds in winter plumage and immature birds are mainly grey on the upperparts and breast and white on the underparts with streaking. Their breeding habitat is rocky tundra areas in Alaska and the Yukon. The female lays 4 eggs in a depression on the ground lined with vegetation. Both parents look after the young birds, who feed themselves.

These birds migrate to the Pacific coasts of North and South America, from southern Alaska to Tierra del Fuego.

On the nesting grounds, these birds mainly eat insects and some seeds. At other times of year, they eat mollusks and crustaceans found along the surf line on rocky coasts and are usually found in small flocks, often with turnstones.

The song is a whistled tee tee tee.

== Taxonomy ==
The surfbird was formally described in 1789 by the German naturalist Johann Friedrich Gmelin in his revised and expanded edition of Carl Linnaeus's Systema Naturae. He placed it with the other sandpipers in the genus Tringa and coined the binomial name Tringa virgata. Gmelin based his description on the "streaked sandpiper" that had been described in 1785 by the English ornithologist John Latham from a specimen collected in 1778 from Sandwich Sound (now Prince William Sound, Alaska) on James Cook's third voyage to the Pacific Ocean. The species was moved to the monotypic genus Aphriza by John James Audubon in 1839. It is now one of 24 species placed in the genus Calidris that was introduced in 1804 by the German naturalist Blasius Merrem. The genus name is from Ancient Greek kalidris or skalidris, a term used by Aristotle for some grey-coloured waterside birds. The specific epithet virgata is from Latin virgatus meaning "striped" or "streaked". The species is treated as monotypic: no subspecies are recognised. Within the genus Calidris the surfbird is most closely related to the great knot (Calidris tenuirostris).

The species was long thought to be allied to the turnstones, and placed in the subfamily Arenariinae. With the turnstones it has even been treated as its own family. More recent data suggests it is very close genetically to the red and great knots and should be included in Calidris. Indeed, the great knot looks very much like a larger, longer-billed, and somewhat darker surfbird.

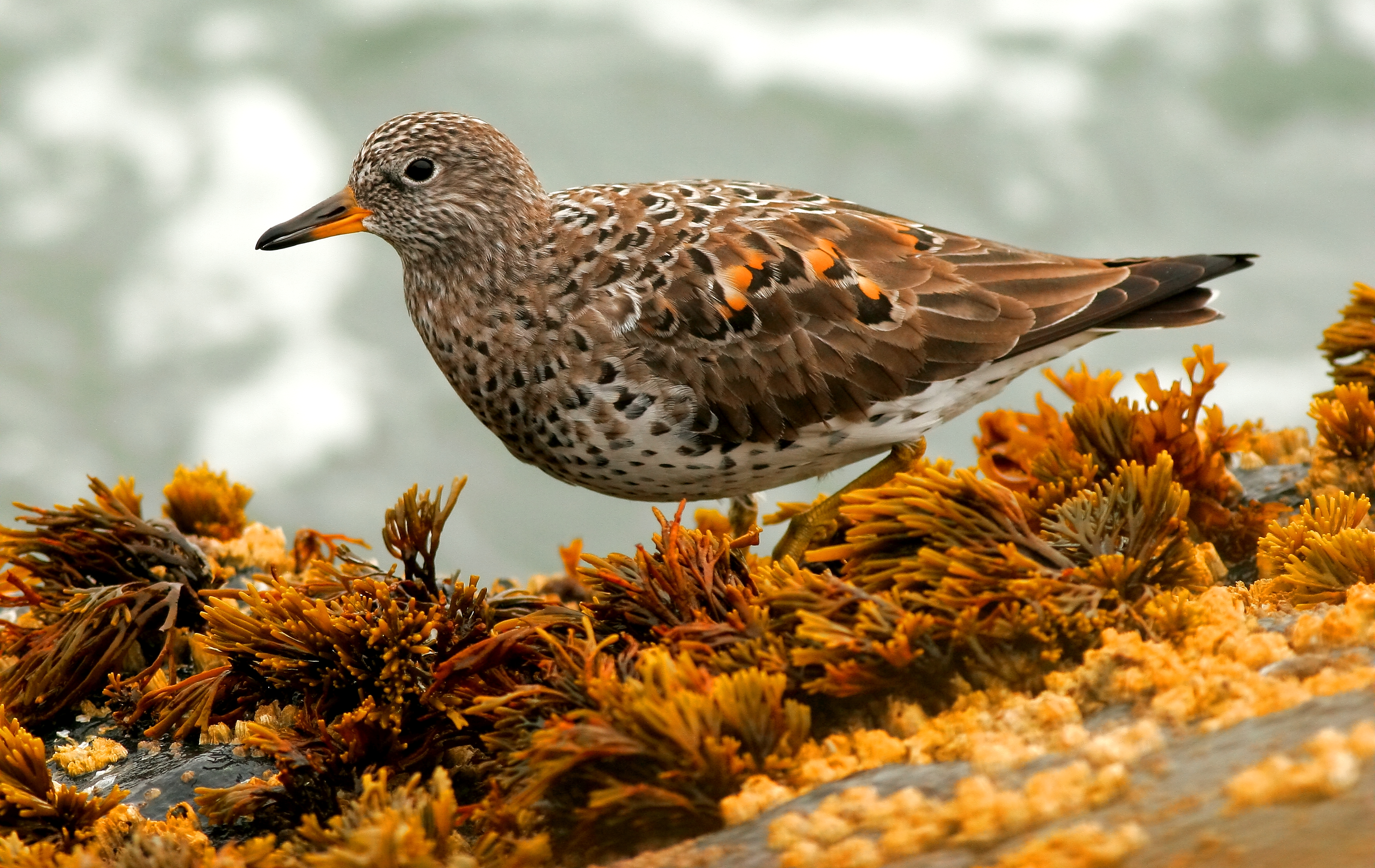
Surfbird in Humboldt County, California.

== Description ==
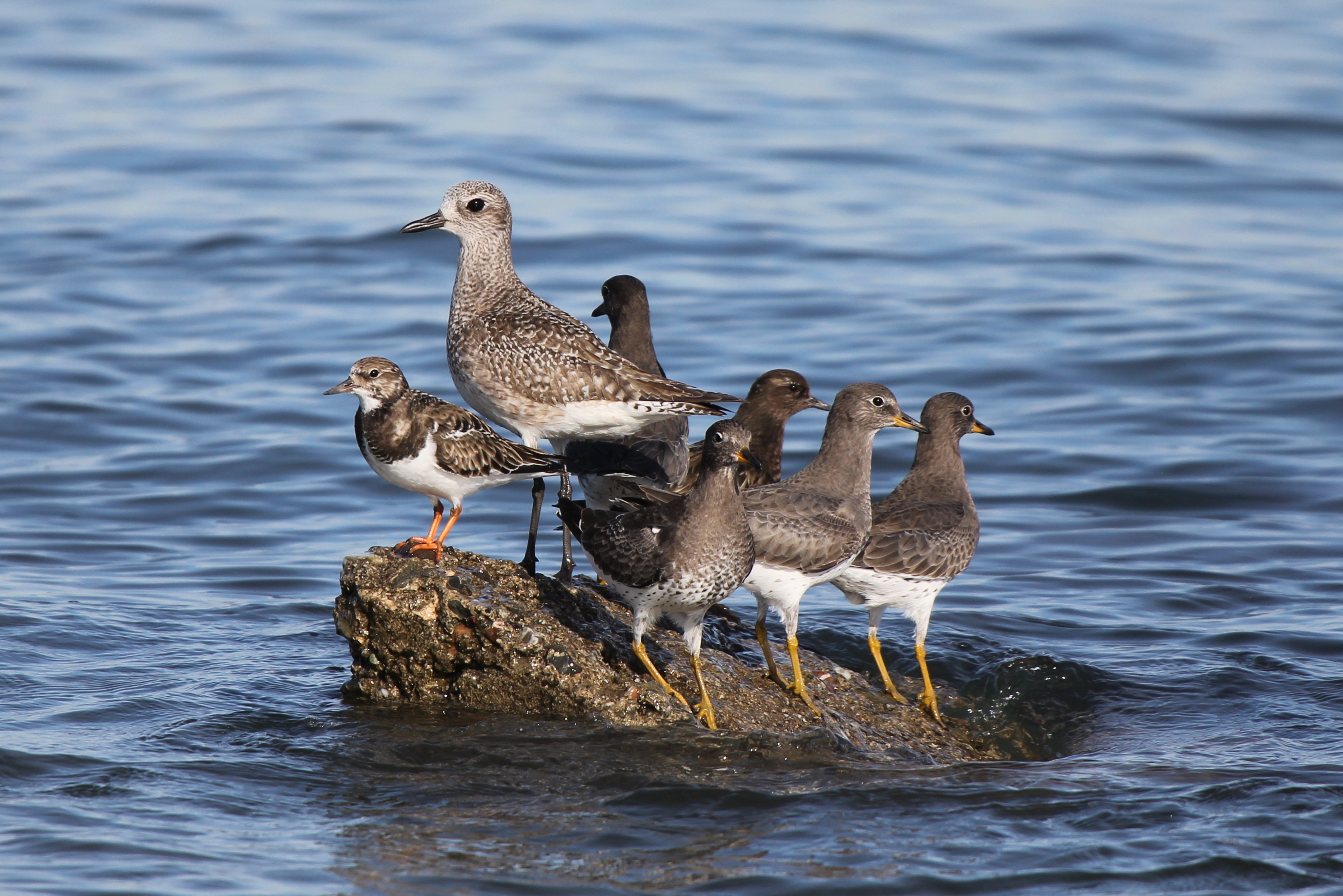
Surfbirds in winter plumage with a ruddy turnstone (left), black-bellied plover (second from left) and black turnstones (back).

The surfbird is a large sandpiper, reminiscent of the turnstones or the great knot. It measures 23 to 26 cm (9.1–10.2 in) and weighs 133–251 g (4.7–8.9 oz). The sexes look the same, but the females are slightly larger than males on average.

Surfbirds their breeding plumage from March through August, and have white heads, necks breast and belly which are streaked with black, except for the crown which are rusty. The streaking becomes less prominent lower in the body.

== Distribution and habitat ==
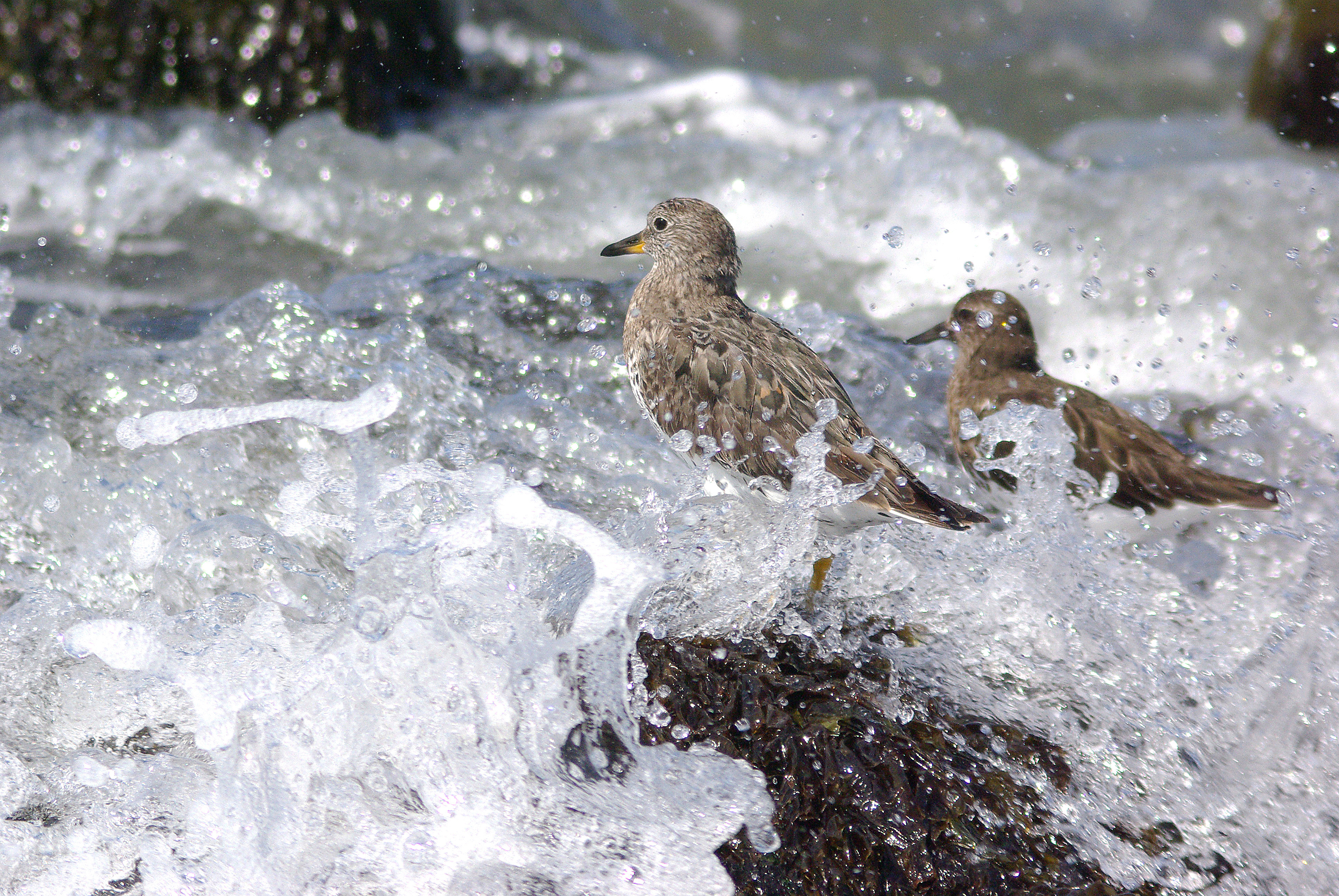
Non-breeding surfbirds feed in the spray zone of rocky shores.

The surfbird has the longest and narrowest non-breeding distribution of any North American bird, being found from Kodiak Island in Alaska to the Straits of Magellan at the southern tip of South America. Along that range it is rarely found more than a few meters from the shore. During the breeding season it is found on the mountains of Alaska and the western Yukon, from 150–1,800 m (490–5,910 ft).

The surfbird starts leaving its breeding grounds from July (the last leaving in October), and begins reaching its main wintering grounds in Chile and Peru in mid August. On its return migration it begins to leave South America in early March. Some birds remain on the wintering grounds year-round. Vagrant birds have been seen in the Falkland Islands, Florida, and Texas. The migration routes are almost entirely coastal, a very small number of birds have been seen inland during migration.

Its breeding habitat is alpine tundra, preferably rocky ridges dominated by scree, rock fields, lichens, dwarf shrubs and Dryas (mountain avens), and less commonly in tundra with mosses and sedges. It is generally found away from suitable habitat that is close to forest. In the non breeding season, it is a rocky shore specialist, feeding on rocky shores, reefs, and ledges on the coast. It will feed from the spray zone on the water's edge to just above the tide line. In some circumstances, it will feed on sandy beaches and mudflats near rocky areas.

== Behavior ==
=== Diet and feeding ===
The diet of breeding surfbirds is dominated by insects. On one study examining stomach contents, flies (Diptera), including eggs, pupae and adults, composed 55% of the food taken by surfbirds, and beetles Coleoptera 36%. Other insects taken include moths and butterflies (Lepidoptera) and bees and wasps (Hymenoptera). Seeds and snails are also taken, albeit rarely.

=== Breeding ===
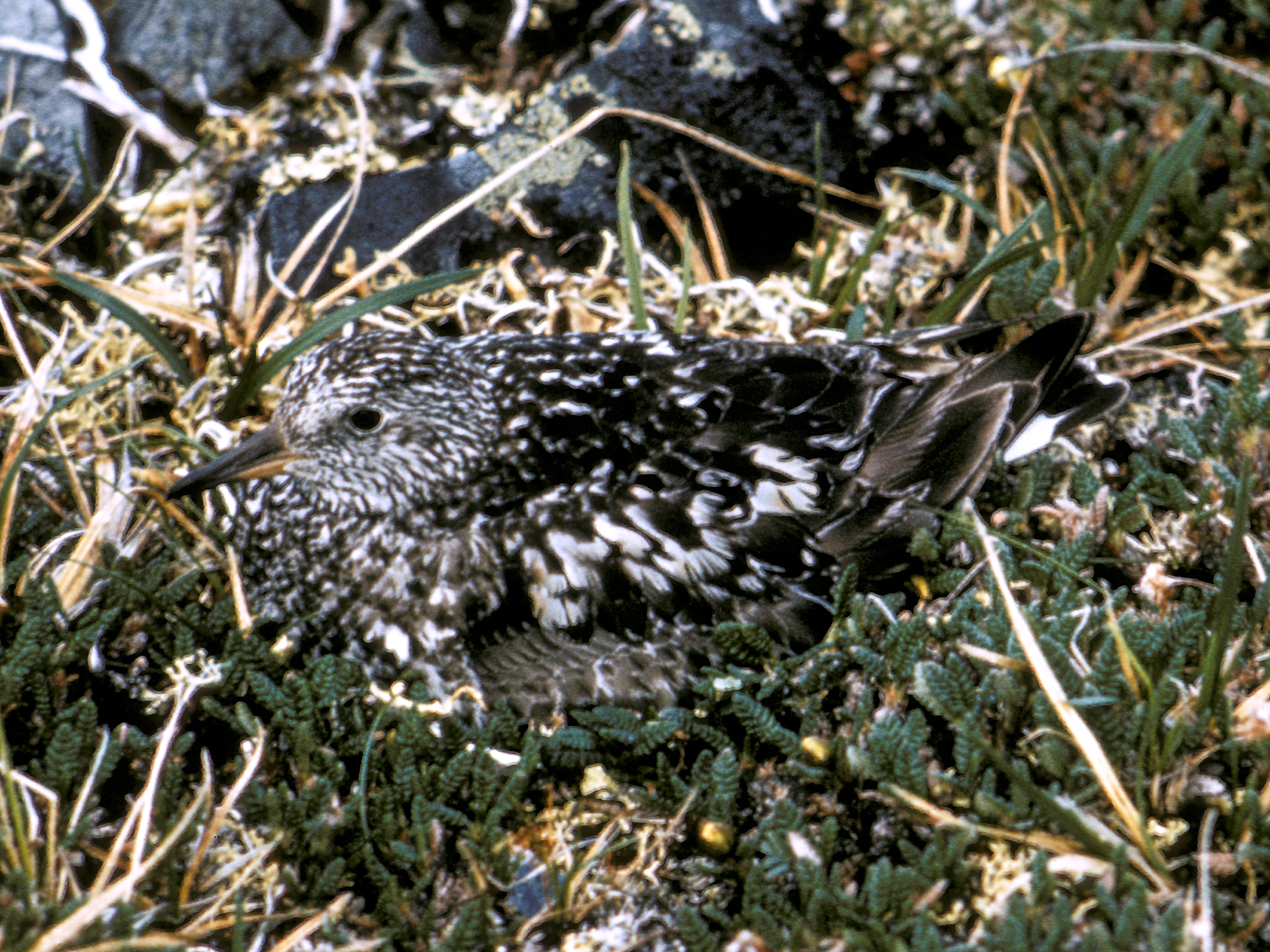
Surfbird on its nest

The breeding behavior of the surfbird is poorly known. The surfbird arrives in its breeding habitat in early May; due to high winds in their exposed nesting areas the snow has usually cleared by then. Nesting sites are typically on north or west facing slopes. Nests are exposed, and a re simple depressions lined with lichens and, sometimes, Dryas. The species is assumed to be territorial and monogamous. Clutch size is usually four eggs, although smaller clutches have been found.

The eggs are buff-colored with gray or purple markings, and measure 43 mm × 31 mm (1.7 in × 1.2 in). Both sexes incubate the eggs and the incubation period is estimated to be between 22 and 24 days.
