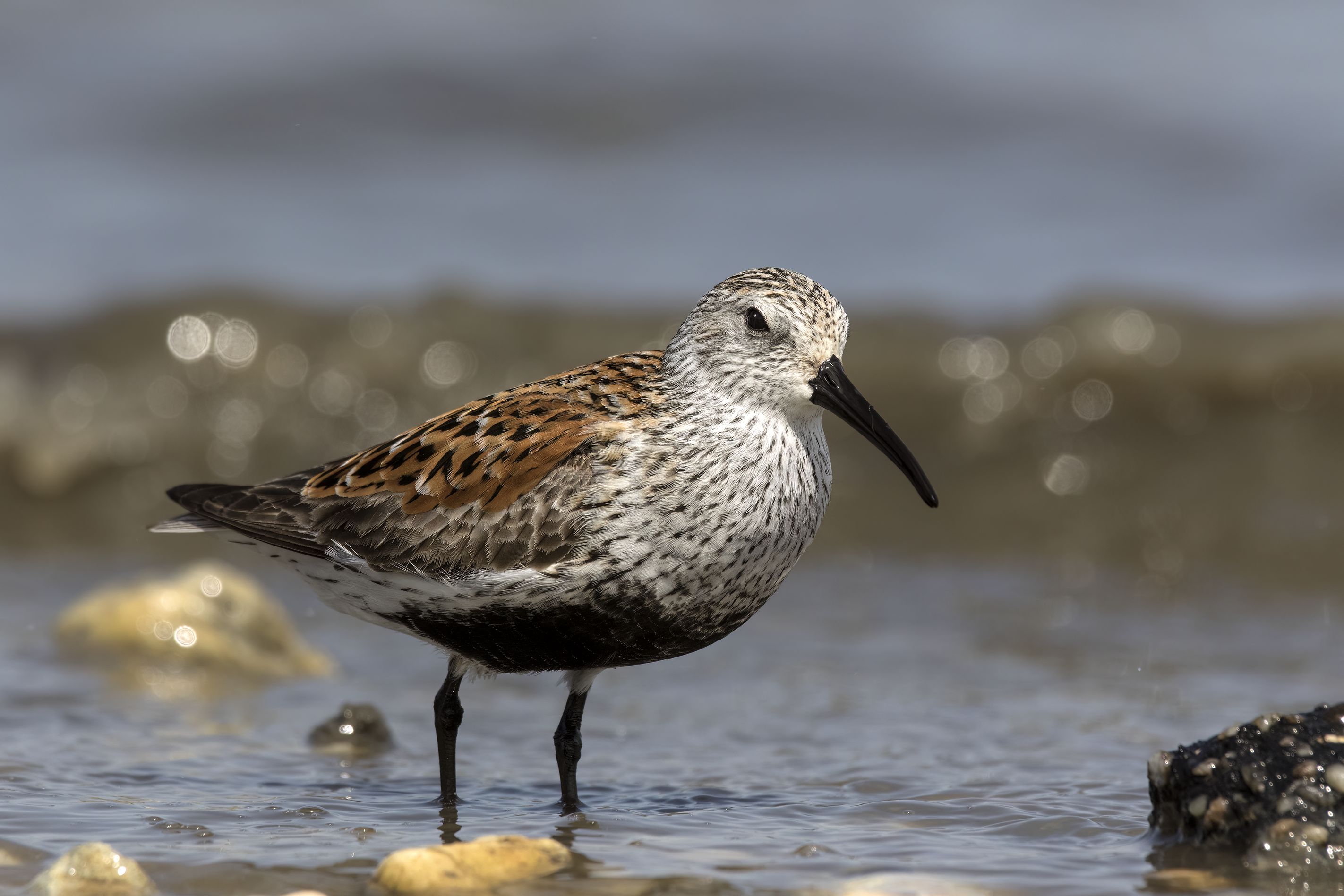
- C. a. hudsonia in breeding plumage
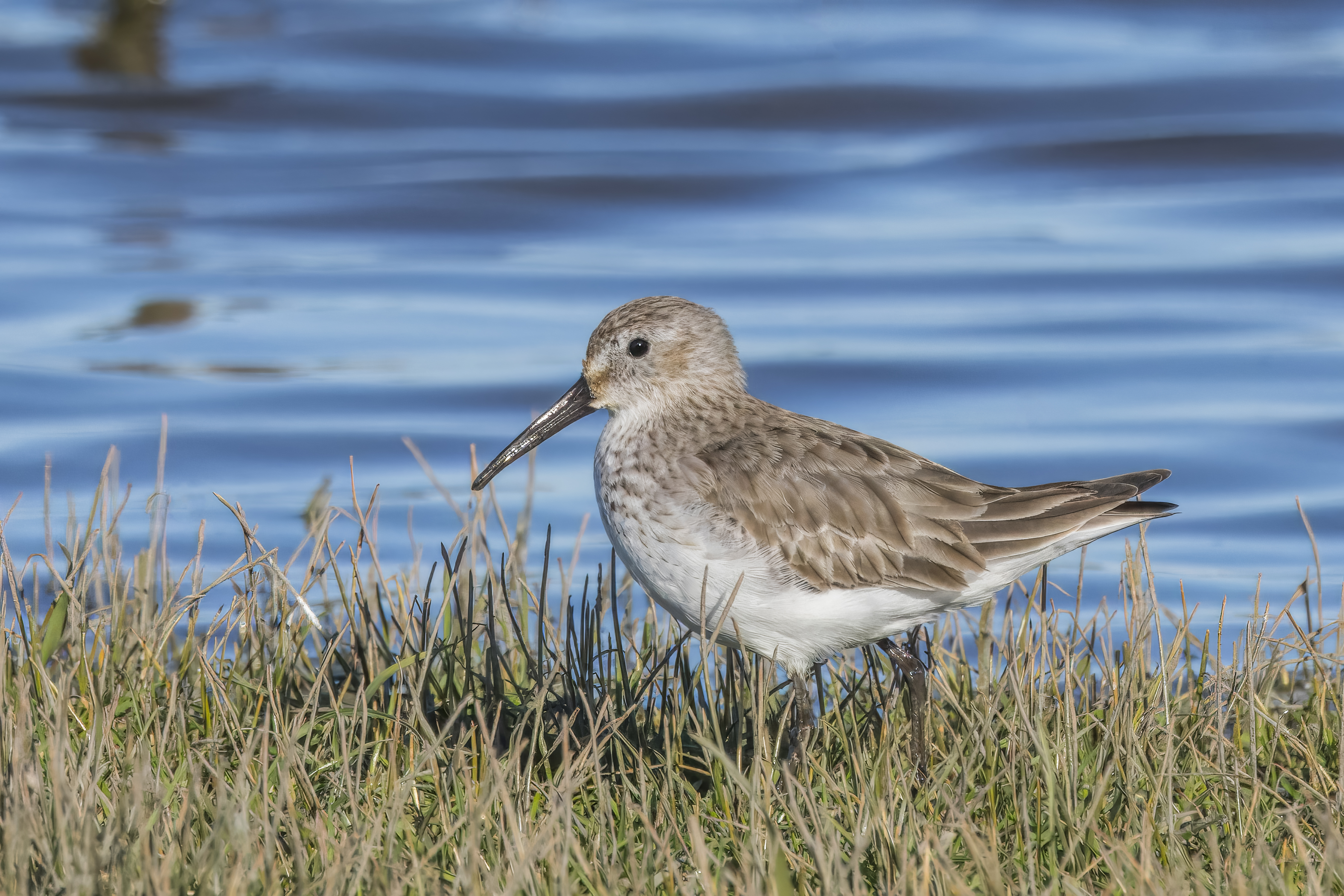
- C. a. alpina in non-breeding plumage, Netherlands Display song recorded in Cardiganshire, Wales

Conservation status
- Near Threatened (IUCN 3.1)

Scientific classification
- Kingdom: Animalia
- Phylum: Chordata
- Class: Aves
- Order: Charadriiformes
- Family: Scolopacidae
- Genus: Calidris
- Species: C. alpina

Binomial name
- Calidris alpina (Linnaeus, 1758)
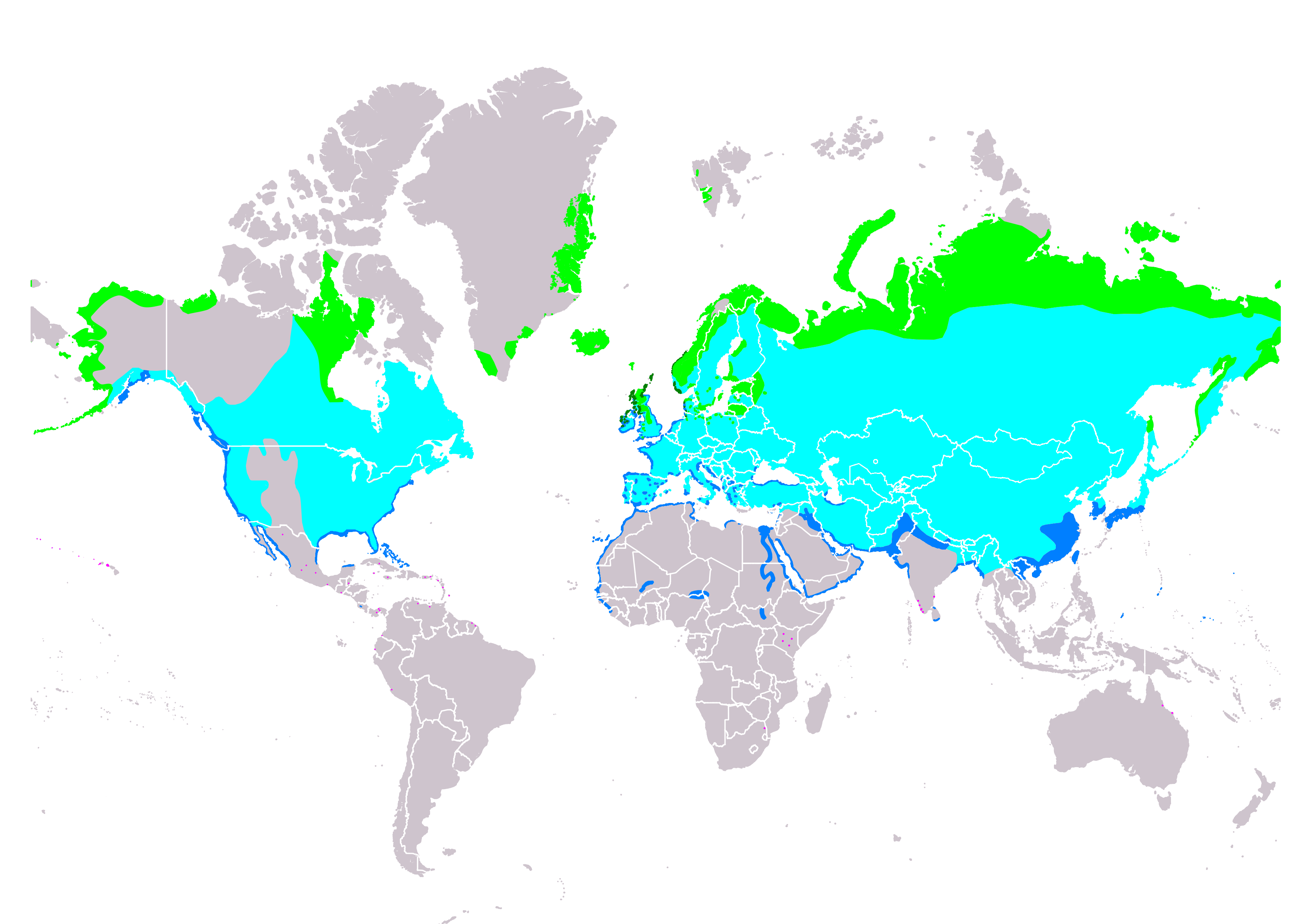
- Range of C. alpina Breeding migrant Breeding resident Non-breeding Passage Vagrant (seasonality uncertain)

Synonyms
- Tringa alpina Linnaeus, 1758; Erolia alpina (Linnaeus, 1758); Pelidna alpina (Linnaeus, 1758)

= Dunlin =

Species of bird

The dunlin (Calidris alpina) is a small wader in the genus Calidris. The English name is a dialect form of "dunling", first recorded in 1531–1532. It derives from dun, "dull brown", with the suffix -ling, meaning a person or thing with the given quality.

It is a circumpolar breeder in Arctic or subarctic regions. Birds that breed in western Europe are short-distance migrants largely staying on western and southern European and northwest African coasts; those breeding in far northern Europe and Asia are long-distance migrants, wintering south to Africa, southeast and west Asia. Birds that breed in Alaska and the Canadian Arctic migrate short distances to the Pacific and Atlantic coasts of North America, although those nesting in northern Alaska overwinter in Asia.

== Taxonomy ==
The dunlin was formally described by the Swedish naturalist Carl Linnaeus in 1758 in the tenth edition of his Systema Naturae under the binomial name Tringa alpina. Linnaeus specified the location as Lapland. This species was formerly placed (with the other "stints") by some American authors in the genus Erolia, but is now placed with 23 other sandpipers in the genus Calidris that was introduced in 1804 by the German naturalist Blasius Merrem. The genus name is from Ancient Greek kalidris or skalidris, a term used by Aristotle for some grey-coloured waterside birds. The specific alpina is from Latin and means "of high mountains", in this case referring to alpine tundra habitats generally, rather than the Alps specifically.

Ten subspecies are recognised:

- C. a. actites Nechaev & Tomkovich, 1988—breeds on Sakhalin
- C. a. alpina (Linnaeus, 1758)—breeds in northern Scandinavia, Svalbard, and northwest Siberia
- C. a. arctica (Schiøler, 1922)—breeds in northeast Greenland. Smallest subspecies, short-billed; silvery upperparts with minimal rufous; small black belly patch.
- C. a. arcticola (Todd, 1953)—breeds from northwest Alaska to northwest Canada
- C. a. centralis (Buturlin, 1932)—breeds in north-central and northeast Siberia
- C. a. hudsonia (Todd, 1953)—breeds in central Canada
- C. a. kistchinski Tomkovich, 1986—breeds around the Sea of Okhotsk to Kuril Islands and Kamchatka
- C. a. pacifica (Coues, 1861)—breeds in western and southern Alaska
- C. a. sakhalina (Vieillot, 1816)—breeds in eastern Russia to the Chukchi Peninsula
- C. a. schinzii (Brehm & Schilling, 1822)—breeds in southeast Greenland, Iceland, the British Isles, southern Scandinavia & the Baltic. Browner upperparts; small black belly patch.

== Description ==
Measurements:

- Length: 16–20 cm (6.3–7.9 in)
- Weight: 34–77 g (1 1/4–2 3/4 oz)
- Wingspan: 38–43 cm (15–17 in)

An adult dunlin in breeding plumage shows the distinctive black belly which no other similar-sized wader possesses. In winter, dunlins are greyish-brown above and white below. Juveniles are brown above with two weak whitish "V" shapes on the back, though less obvious than the same feature on little stint and some other species in the genus. They usually have black marks on the flanks or belly. All ages show a narrow white wingbar in flight. The legs and slightly decurved bill are black. The subspecies differ mainly in the extent of rufous plumage and the size of the black belly patch in the breeding season, and the bill length; in winter there are no subspecific distinctions in the plumage, with only the bill length providing a limited guide. Bill length varies between sexes, the females having longer bills than the males, further complicating winter subspecies identification. On the tip of the Dunlin's bill is a soft covering that fills with blood and with many nerve endings, forming a sensitive probe that is used to locate invertebrate prey in mud and sand. Although the bill can look sharp-pointed in dead specimens, in life it is blunt.

The call is a typical sandpiper "chreep", and the display song a harsh trill.

== Distribution and habitat ==
Dunlin are small migratory waders, however they show strong philopatry with individuals of the southern subspecies Calidris alpina schinzii in Sweden and Finland returning to, or very close to, their natal patches. Habitat fragmentation has reduced the availability of habitat patches to these birds through reducing patch size and increasing patch isolation. This reduced connectivity between patches has reduced the movements of Dunlin leaving them more susceptible to inbreeding in these locations.

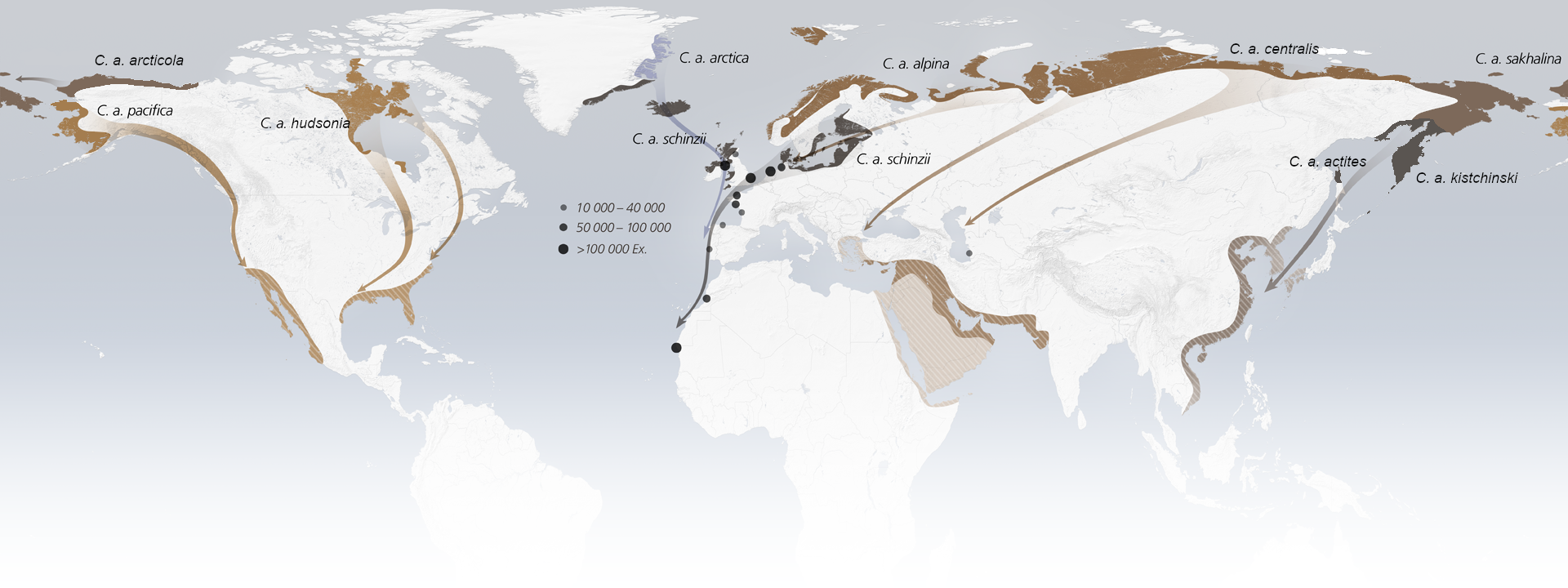
Distribution of subspecies, migration routes, and major European wintering sites

== Ecology and behaviour ==
The dunlin is highly gregarious in winter, sometimes forming large flocks on coastal mudflats or sandy beaches. Large numbers can often be seen swirling in synchronized flight on stop-overs during migration or on their winter habitat.

This bird is one of the most common waders throughout its breeding and wintering ranges, and it is the species with which other waders tend to be compared. At 17–21 cm (6.7–8.3 in) length and with a 32–36 cm (13–14 in) wingspan, it is similar in size to a common starling, but stouter, with a longer, thicker bill.

The dunlin moves along the coastal mudflat beaches it prefers with a characteristic "sewing machine" feeding action, methodically picking small food items. Insects, particularly Diptera, form the main part of the dunlin's diet on the nesting grounds; it eats molluscs, worms and crustaceans in coastal areas.

=== Breeding ===
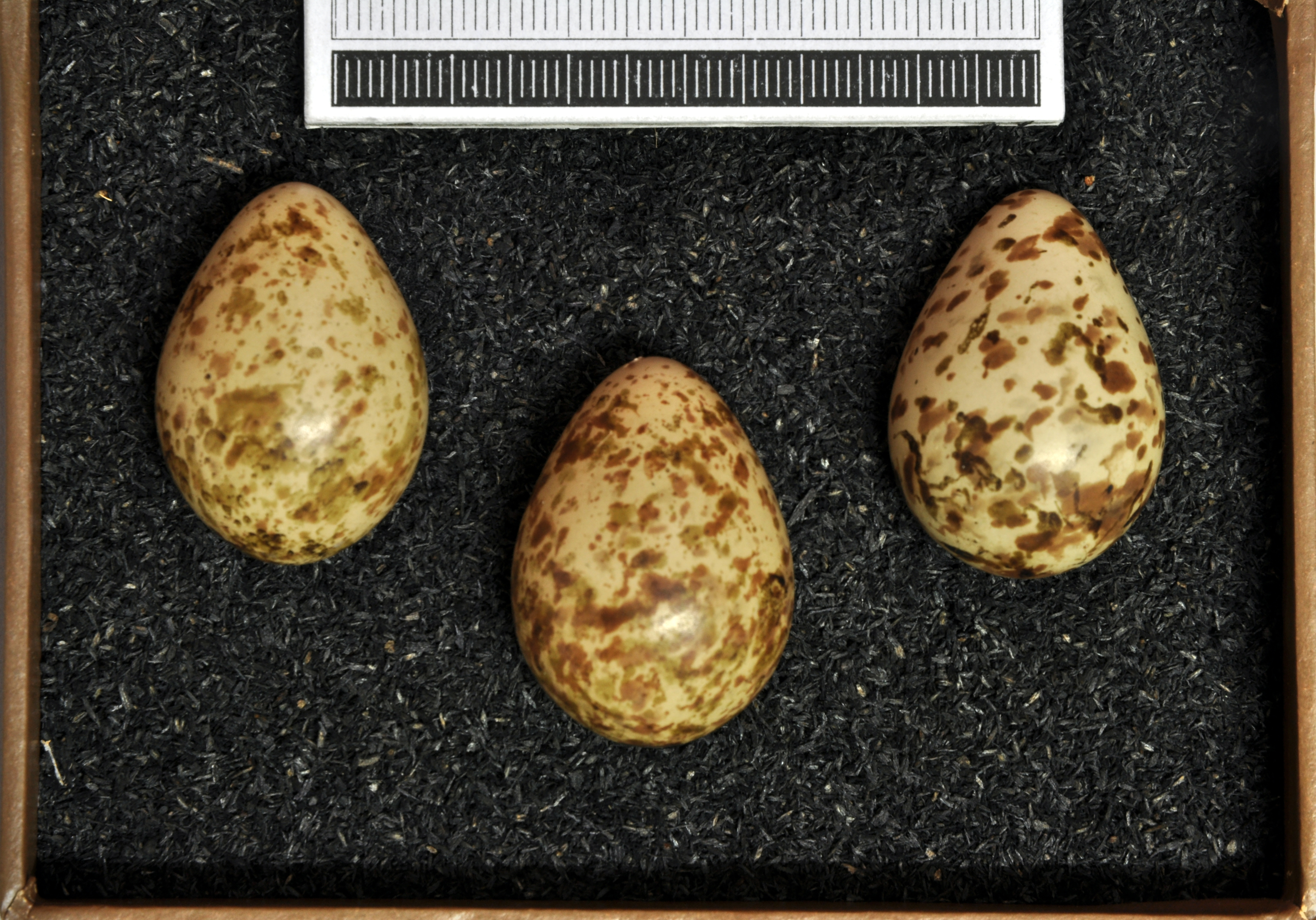
Eggs, Collection Museum Wiesbaden, Germany

The nest is a shallow scrape on the ground lined with vegetation, into which typically four eggs are laid and incubated by the male and female parents. Chicks are precocial, but are brooded during early development. They start to fly at approximately three weeks of age. The majority of brood care is provided by the male, as the female deserts the brood and often leaves the breeding area.

Apparent hybrids between this species and the white-rumped sandpiper as well as with the purple sandpiper have been reported from the Atlantic coasts of North America and Europe, respectively.

== Status ==
The dunlin has an extremely large range and although the population appears to be decreasing, the population is still very large. The International Union for Conservation of Nature (IUCN) has judged that the threat to the species is of "Near Threatened". The dunlin is one of the species to which the Agreement on the Conservation of African-Eurasian Migratory Waterbirds (AEWA) applies. The southern subspecies C. a. schinzii is of particular concern, declining and endangered in some areas, particularly towards the southern edge of its range; in Denmark, only 95 pairs were left in 2021, compared to 50,000 pairs a century earlier. The northeast Greenland subspecies C. a. arctica is also endangered, with a very small population.

== Gallery ==
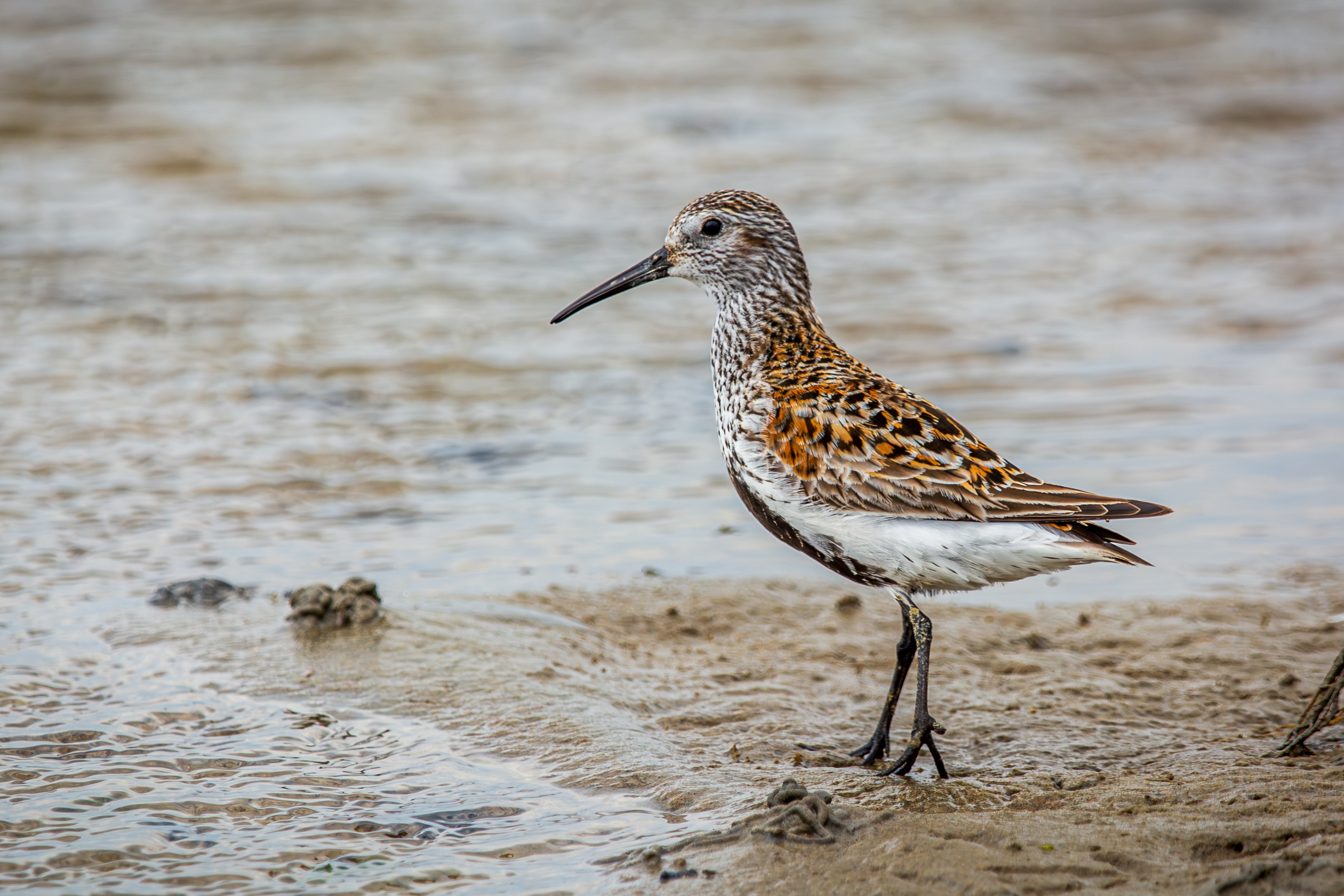
C. a. alpina in breeding plumage on spring migration, Spiekeroog, northern Germany

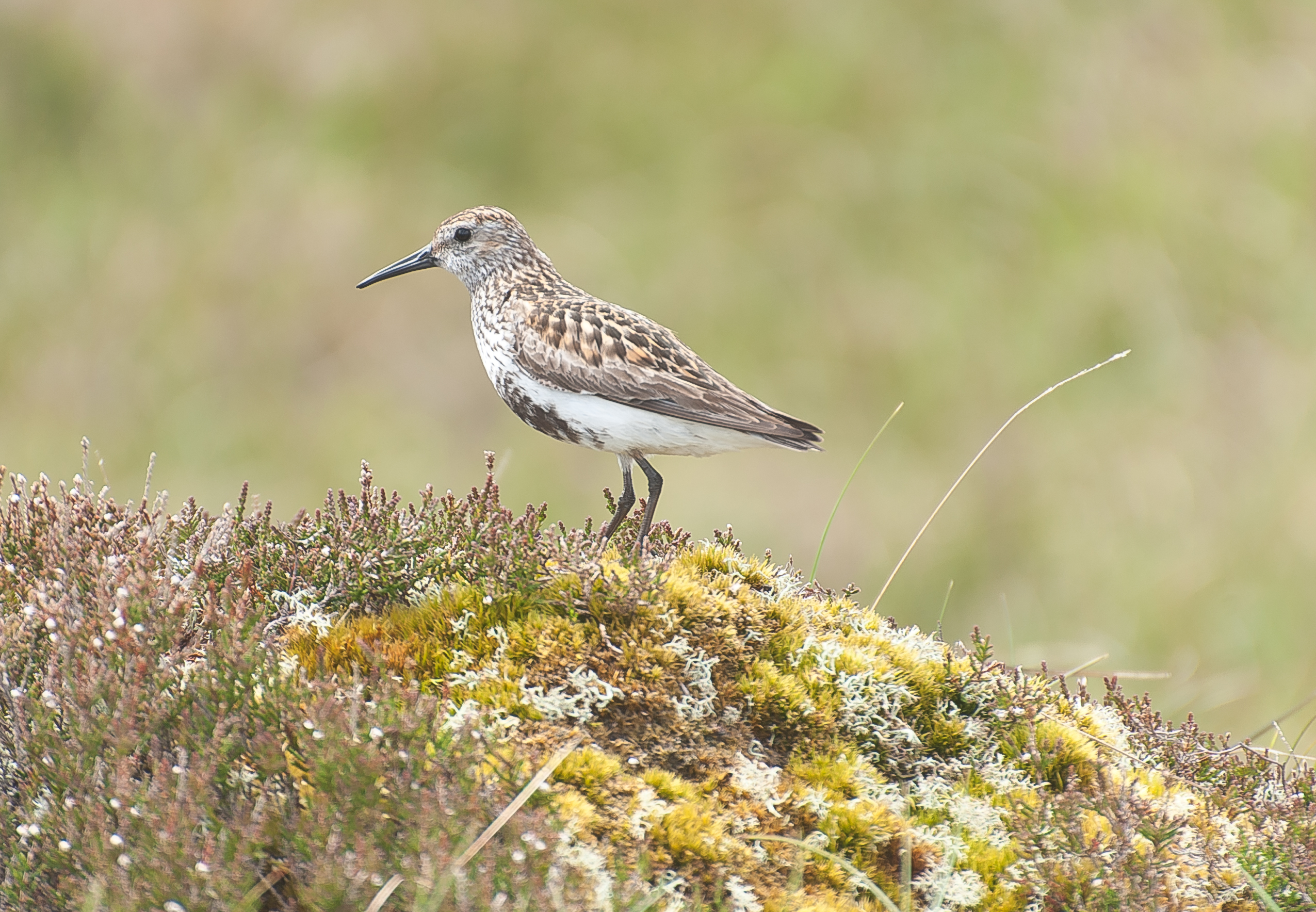
C.a. schinzii, Mellon Udrigle, Scotland

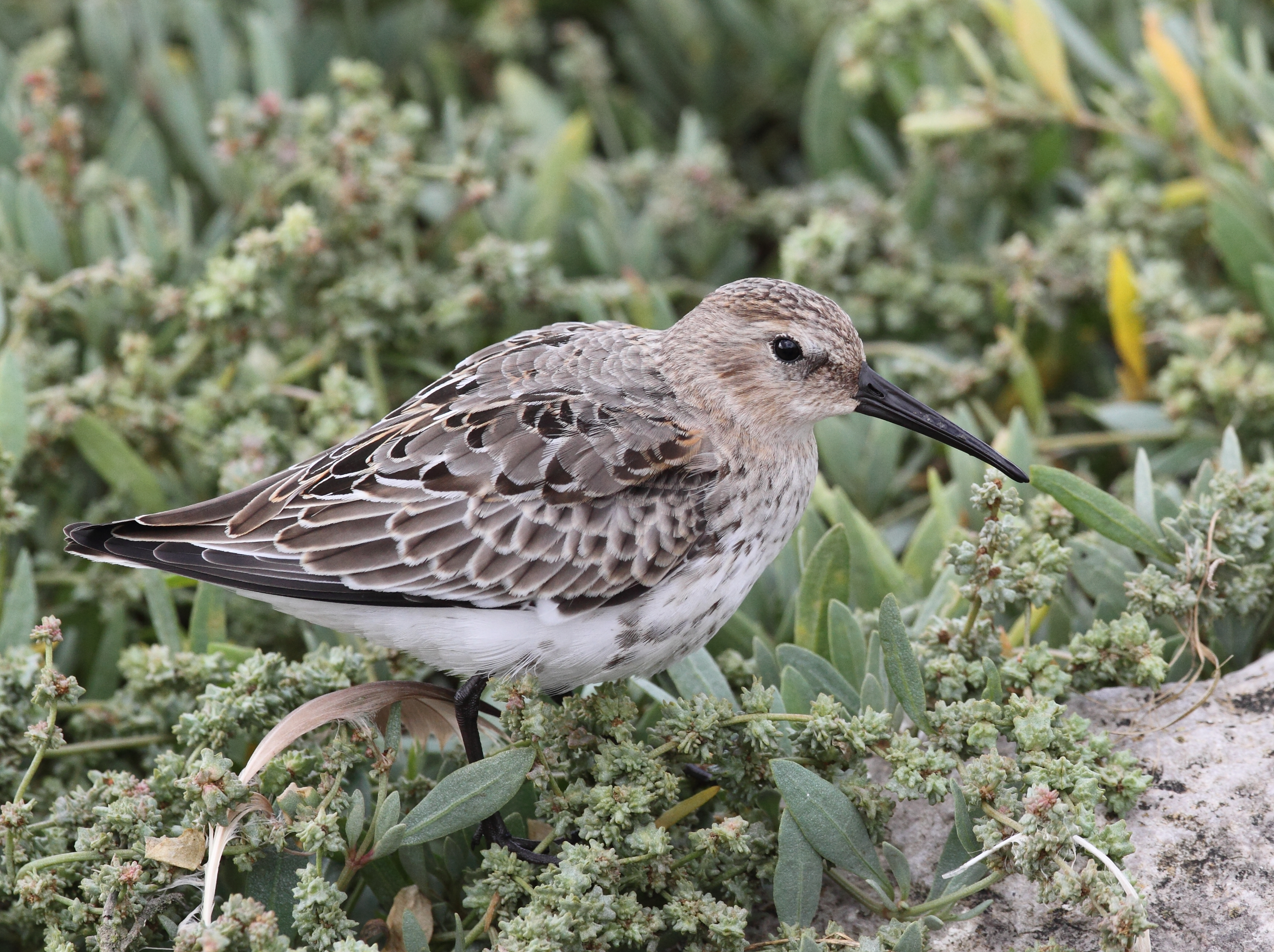
Bird near the end of post-juvenile moult to first-winter plumage, Wales

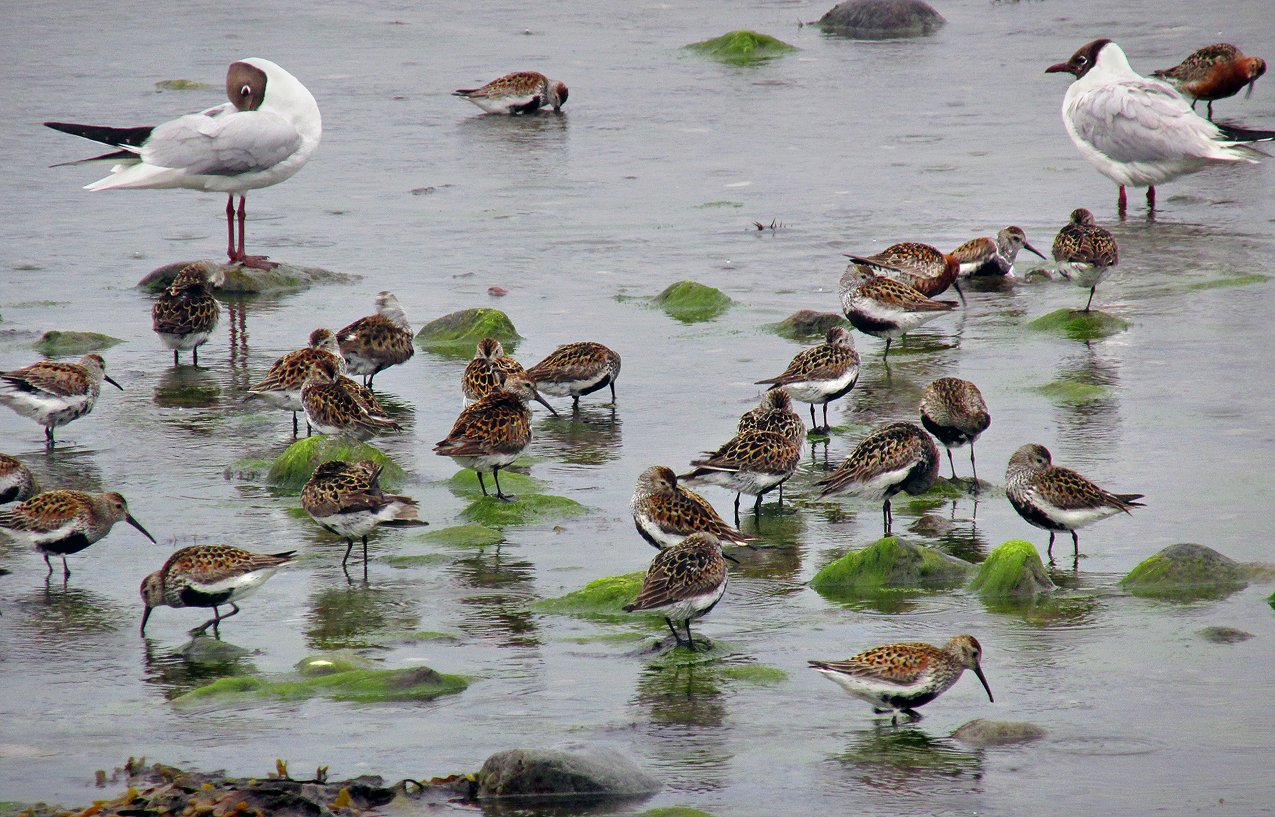
Flock in Ystad, Sweden

Foraging
