= Red-necked stint =

Conservation status
- Near Threatened (IUCN 3.1)

Scientific classification
- Kingdom: Animalia
- Phylum: Chordata
- Class: Aves
- Order: Charadriiformes
- Family: Scolopacidae
- Genus: Calidris
- Species: C. ruficollis

Binomial name
- Calidris ruficollis (Pallas, 1776)
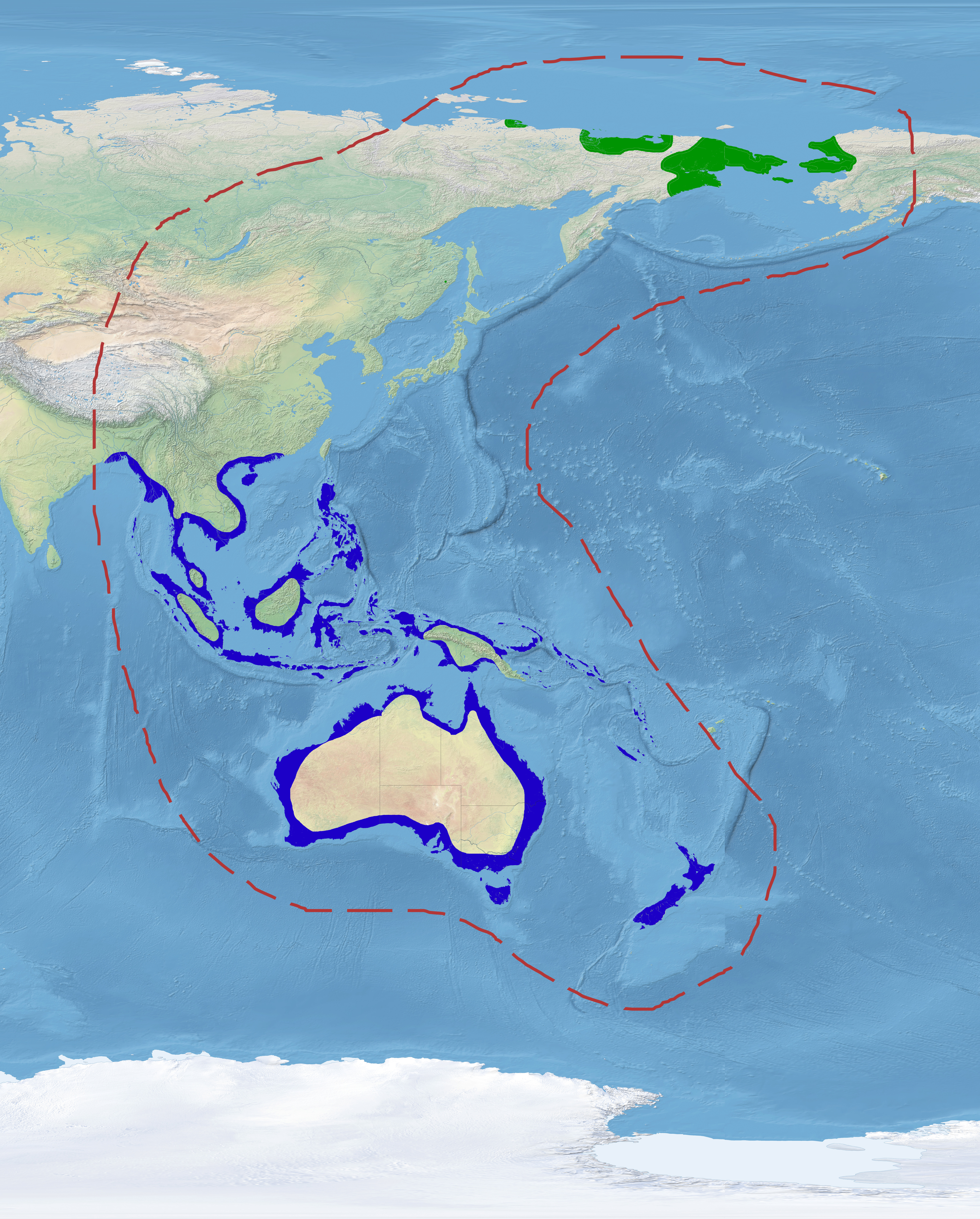
- Range of C. ruficollis Estimated range Breeding range Wintering range

Synonyms
- Erolia ruficollis

Species of bird

The red-necked stint or rufous-necked stint (Calidris ruficollis) is a small migratory wader that breeds in northeast Russia and spends the non-breeding season along the coastlines of Southeast Asia and Australasia.

== Taxonomy ==
The red-necked stint was formally described in 1776 by the German naturalist Peter Simon Pallas under the binomial name Trynga ruficollis. The specific epithet ruficollis is Modern Latin meaning "red-necked" from Latin rufus meaning "red" or "rufous" and -collis meaning "-necked" or "-throated". The type locality is southern Transbaikal in eastern Siberia. The red-necked stint is now placed with 23 other species in the genus Calidris that was introduced in 1804 by the German naturalist Blasius Merrem. The species is monotypic, with no subspecies recognised. Within the genus Calidris the red-necked stint is most closely related to the spoon-billed sandpiper (Calidris pygmaea).

== Description ==
These birds are among the smallest of waders, very similar to the little stint, Calidris minuta, with which they were once considered conspecific. The red-necked stint's small size, fine dark bill, dark legs and quicker movements distinguish this species from all waders except the other dark-legged stints. It measures 13–17 cm (5.1–6.7 in) in length, 28–37 cm (11–15 in) in wingspan, and 21–51 g (0.74–1.80 oz) in weight. It can be distinguished from the western sandpiper and the semipalmated sandpiper in all plumages by its combination of a fine bill tip, unwebbed toes, and longer primary projection.

The breeding adult has an unstreaked orange breast, bordered with dark markings below, and a white V on its back. In winter plumage identification is difficult, although it is shorter legged and longer winged than the little stint. Juveniles have more contrasting mantle plumage and weaker white lines down the back than their relative. The call is a hoarse "stit".

== Distribution and habitat ==
Red-necked stints are strongly migratory, breeding along the Arctic littoral of eastern Eurasia and spending the non-breeding season in Southeast Asia and Australasia as far south as Tasmania and New Zealand. They are rare vagrants to western Europe, with records from Belgium, Denmark, Great Britain, Germany, Ireland, the Netherlands, and Sweden. They are often seen in western Alaska and occasionally elsewhere in the Americas.

== Behaviour ==
Red-necked stints are highly gregarious and will form flocks with other small Calidris waders, such as sharp-tailed sandpipers and curlew sandpipers in their non-breeding areas.

=== Breeding ===
The breeding habitat is low altitude tundra usually in dry raised areas. The birds have only a low degree of site fidelity. The eggs are laid in June. The nest is a shallow depression lined with leaves and grass. The clutch of 3 or 4 eggs is incubated for 20-22 days by both parents. The females leaves soon after the eggs hatch while the male continues to care for the chicks until they fledge at 16-17 days. Only a single brood is raised each year.

=== Food and feeding ===
They forage in wet grassland and soft mud, mainly picking up food by sight. In their non-breeding habitat they feed on intertidal mudflats and along the muddy margins of freshwater lakes. They mainly eat insects and other small invertebrates.

== Gallery ==
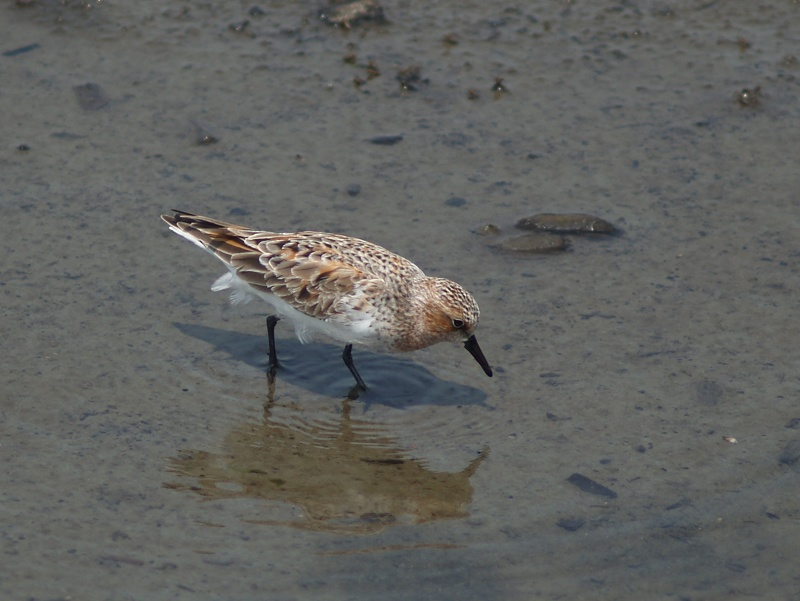
Feeding

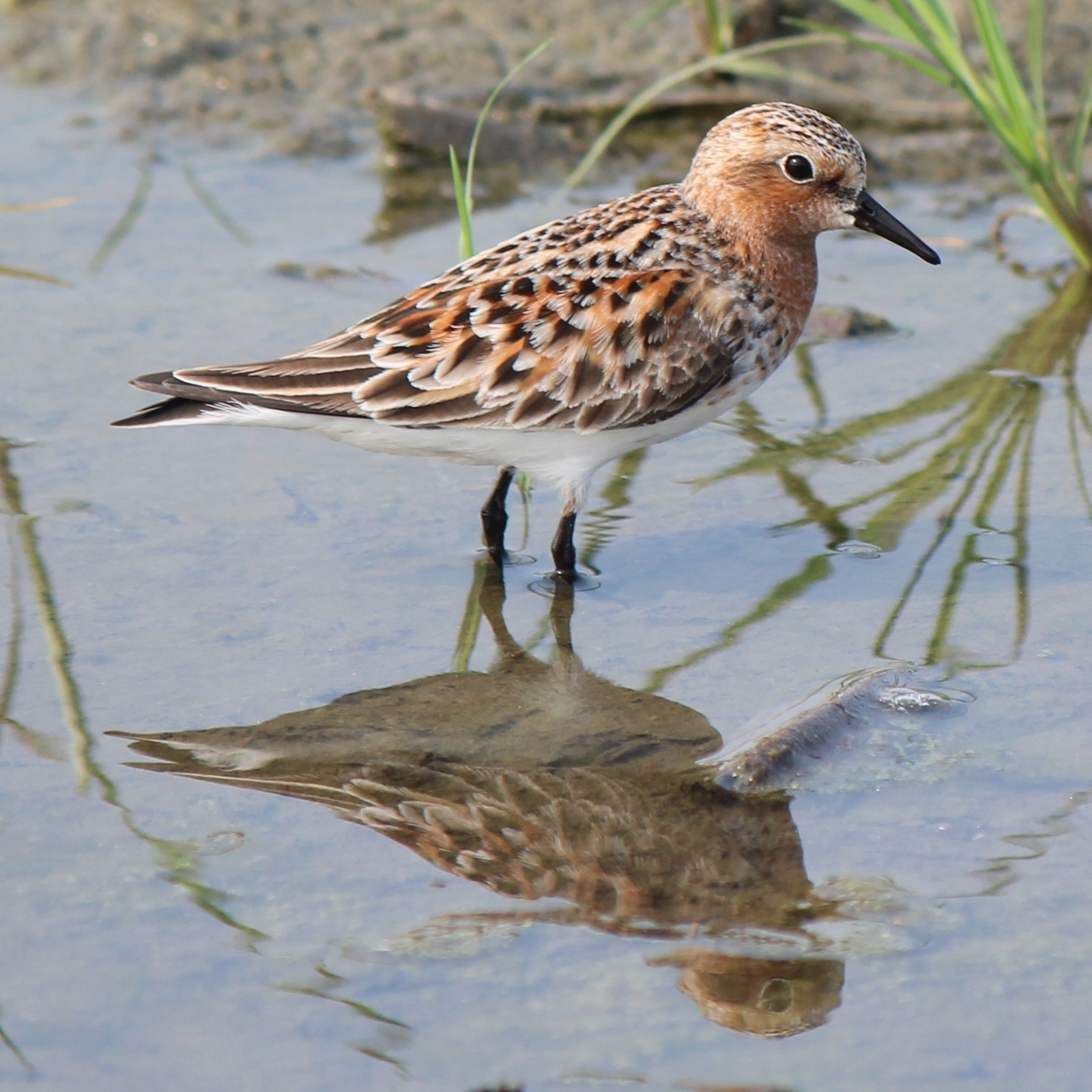
Summer plumage in Japan

Scarborough, SE Queensland, Australia

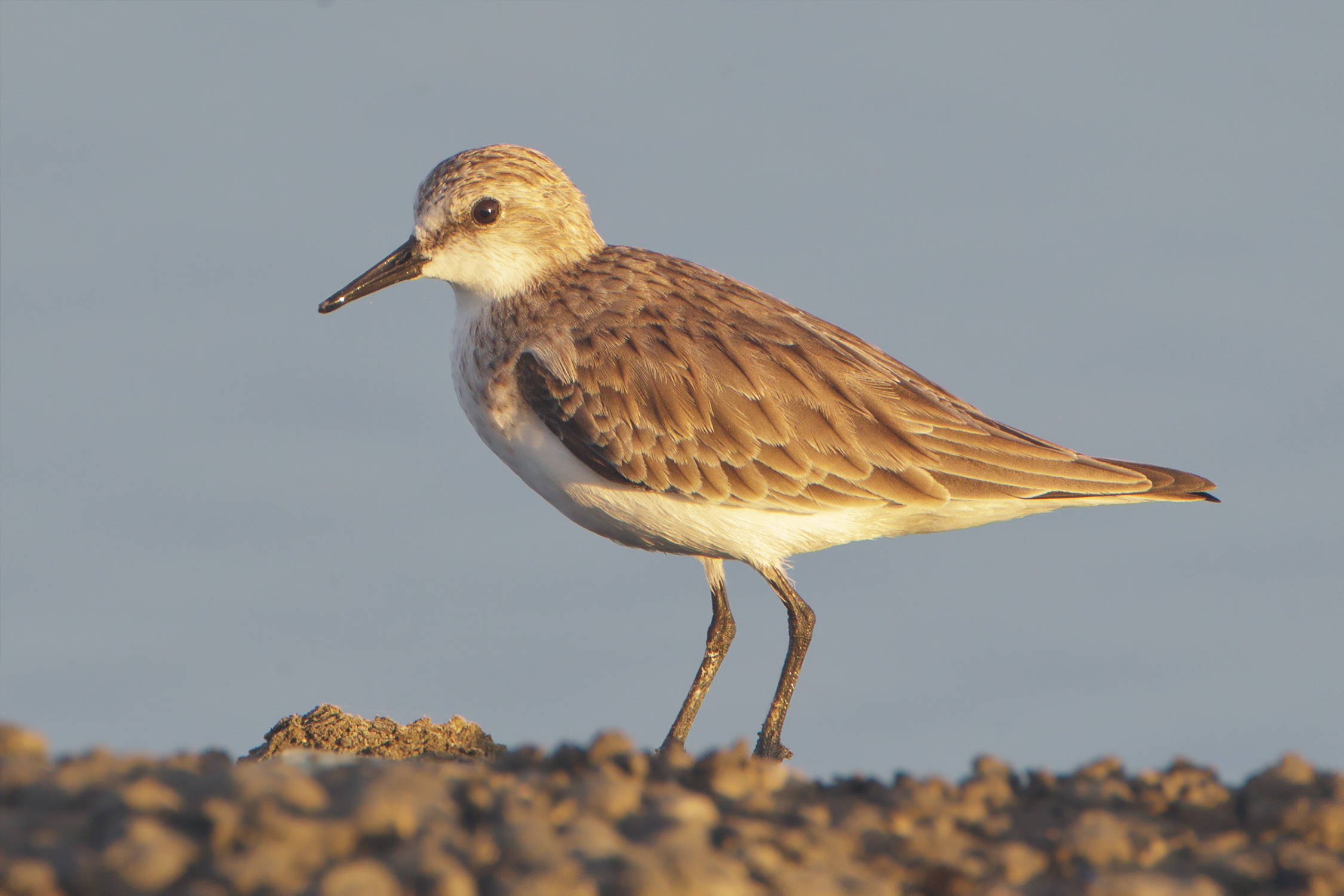
In Thailand

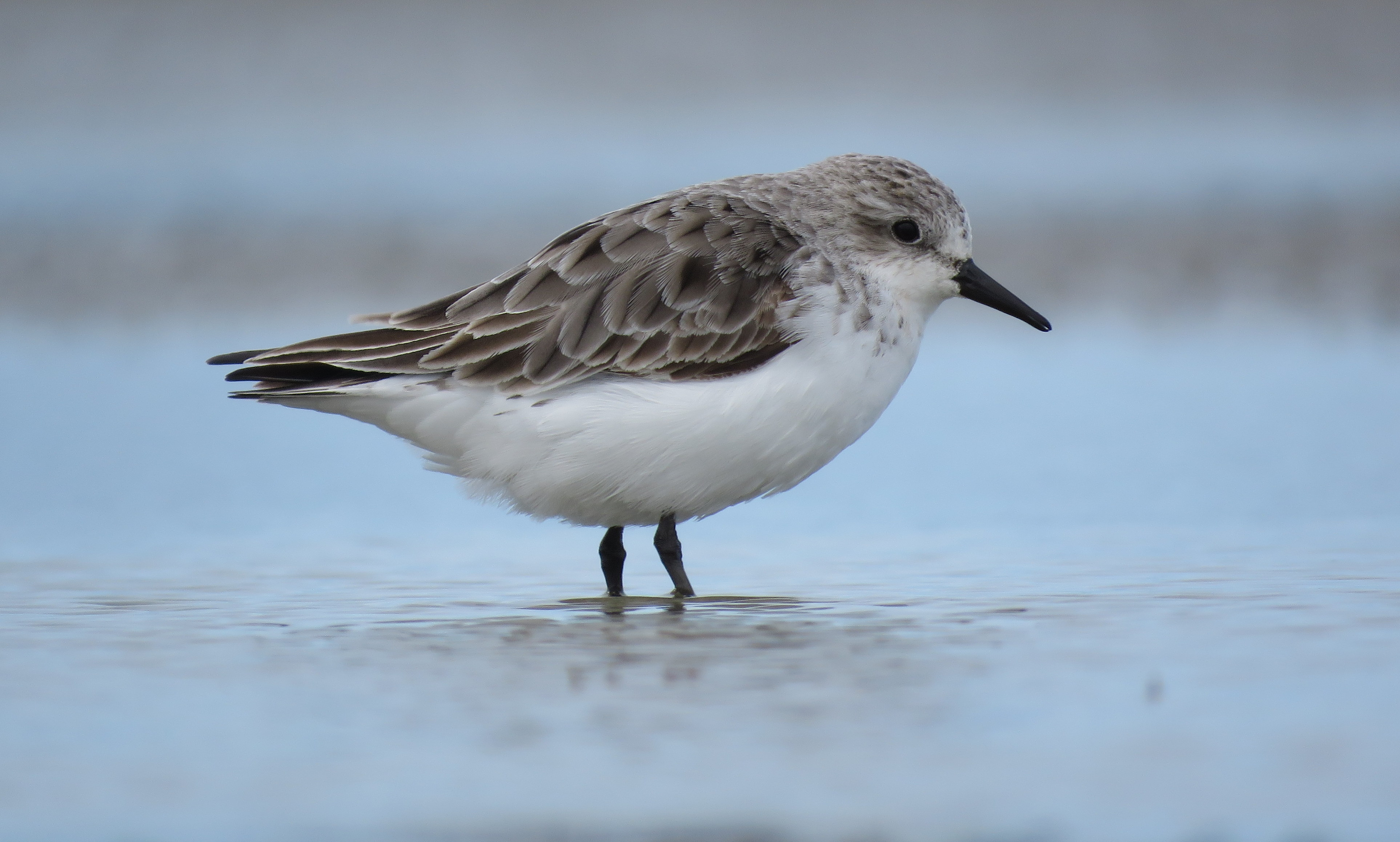
Non-breeding plumage, Lake Ellesmere, New Zealand.

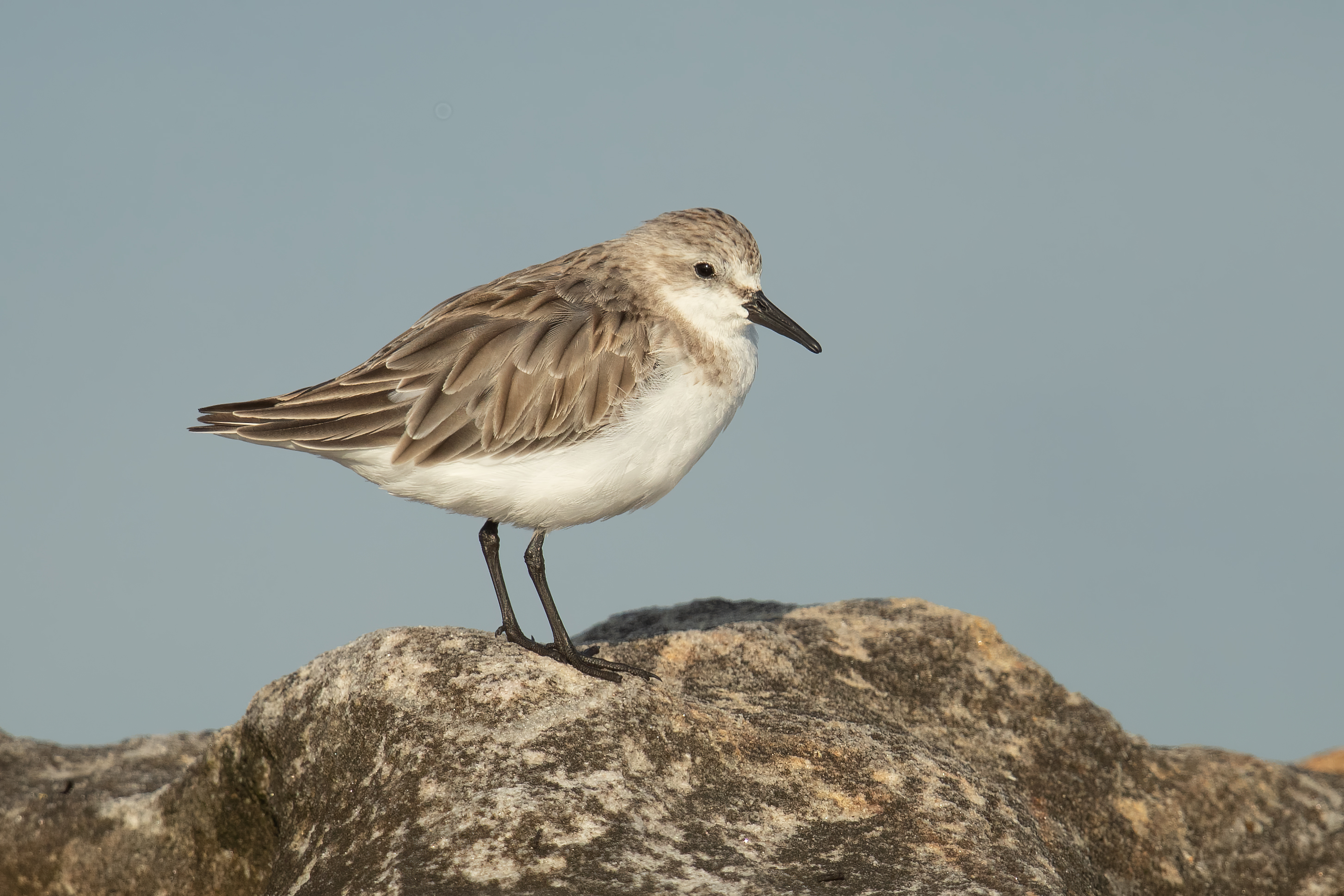
Non-breeding plumage in New South Wales, Australia
