= Towra Point Nature Reserve =

Protected area in New South Wales, Australia

- IUCN category Ia (strict nature reserve)
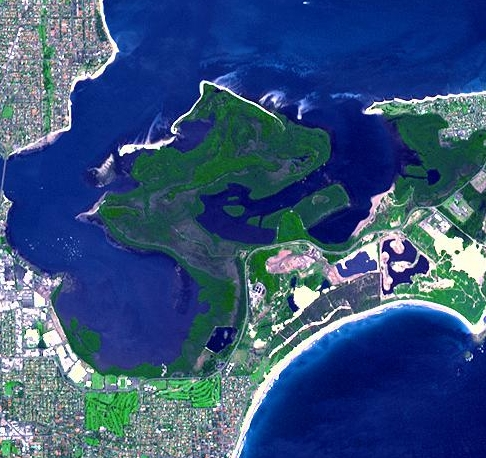
- Aerial photograph of Towra Point and surrounding waters

- Location within New South Wales
- Location: New South Wales
- Nearest city: Sydney
- Coordinates: 34°00′23″S 151°09′55″E
- Area: 6.03 km^{2} (2.33 sq mi)
- Established: August 1982
- Governing body: NSW National Parks & Wildlife Service
- Website: Official website

Ramsar Wetland
- Official name: Towra Point
- Designated: 21 February 1984
- Reference no.: 286

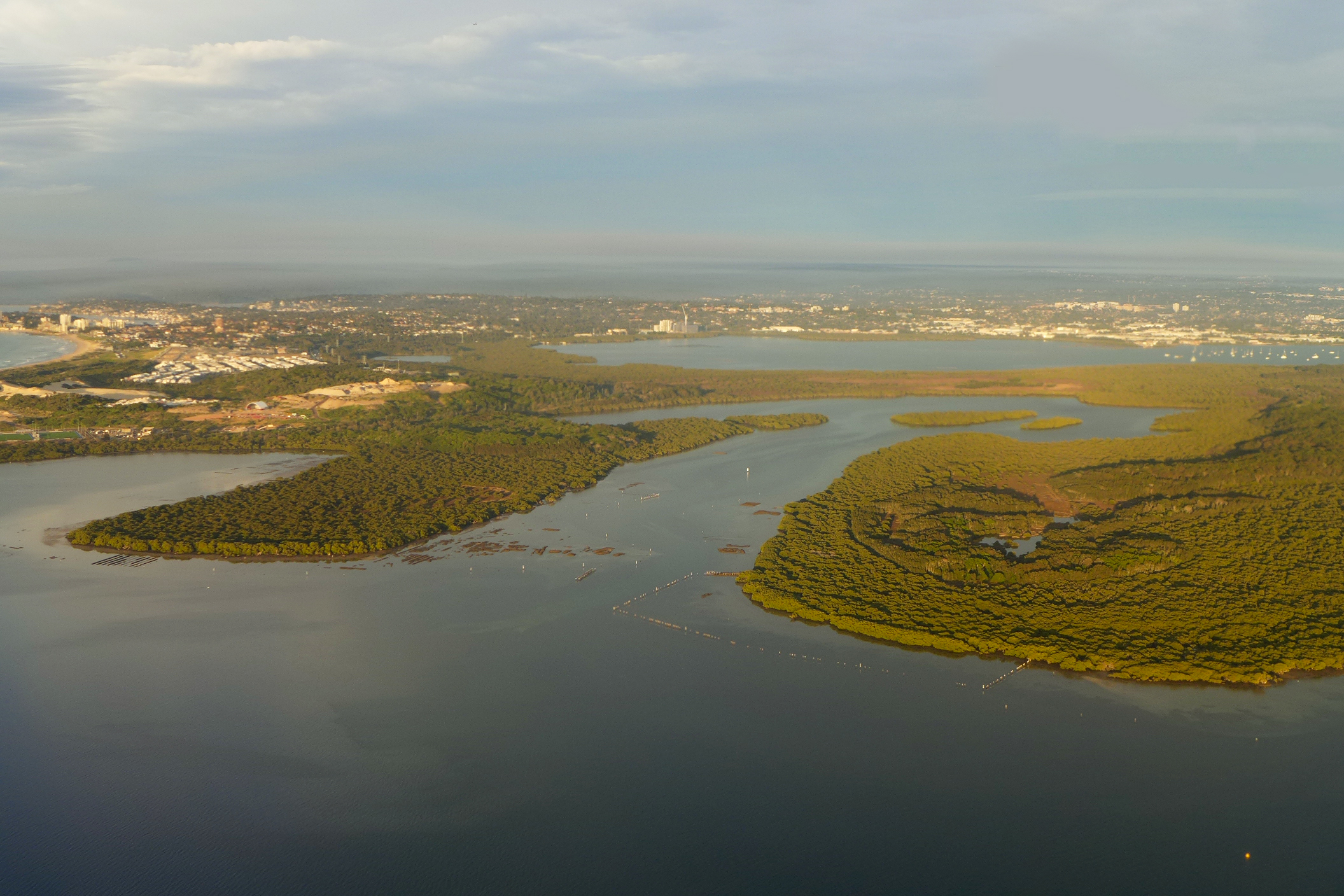
Aerial view of Towra Point Nature Reserve

The Towra Point Nature Reserve is a protected nature reserve in Sutherland Shire, Southern Sydney, New South Wales, in eastern Australia. The 603-hectare (1,490-acre) reserve is situated on the southern shores of Botany Bay at Kurnell, within the Sutherland Shire. The reserve is protected under the Ramsar Convention as a wetland of international importance as an important breeding ground for many vulnerable, protected, or endangered species. The Towra Point Aquatic Nature Reserve is located in the surrounding waterways.

== History ==
A geoshape of Towra Point Nature Reserve

Kurnell was inhabited by the Dharawal people, and there are three middens and one relic that still remain today at the Towra Point Nature Reserve.

Captain Cook mapped Botany Bay when he landed in 1770, including Towra Point. Early European colonialists ran horses and cattle on Towra Point, despite the poor condition of the land for such a purpose. In 1827, "Towra Point" and "Towra Bay" were recorded as local names by the surveyor Robert Dixon. Another name known for the area was "Stinkpot Bay". In 1861, Thomas Holt bought Towra Point, and divided it into paddocks for grazing or growing corn. Sheep grazing was particularly disastrous, and many thousands of sheep died of footrot and are buried at Towra Point. In the late 1870s, Thomas Holt began oyster farming at Weeney Bay in Towra Point. In 1935, the Parks and Playgrounds Movement of NSW opposed an application to mine for shell at Towra Point. During World War II, a radar station was established, and a causeway built. In 1946, Towra Point was considered as a location for a second Sydney airport.

In the 1960s, movement began to preserve Towra Point led initially by the President of Sutherland Shire, Arthur Gietzelt, and Tom Uren, the then Federal Minister for Urban Affairs. In 1965 Ian Griffith, state MP for Cronulla, praised the idea, but was met by community backlash. In March 1969, the then Prime Minister, John Gorton ruled out Towra Point as a potential site for a second airport, citing community noise problems. The opening to Botany Bay was dredged in the 1970s to assist shipping, but this refracted the wave patterns in the bay, focusing them on Towra Point, causing erosion. The building of the revetment wall in Port Botany was also thought to contribute to the changed wave patterns. In 1974 and 1975, the waves off Towra were so strong that teens surfed there.

Following lobbying by Ray Thorburn, the reserve was bought by the Government of Australia in 1975, attempting to fulfil obligations to JAMBA, which would come into force in April 1981. This was the first time that the Australian Government had bought land for nature conservation purposes within a state. On 10 September 1979 the oil tanker World Encouragement spilled approximately 95 tonnes (105 short tons) of crude oil into Botany Bay. Mangroves at Quibray Bay, Weeney Bay and Towra Point were impacted – 100 hectares (250 acres) of mangroves were affected, and 4.4 hectares (11 acres) died.

In 1981, another oil spill occurred at the Matraville refinery, causing more damage to the mangroves. In 1982, Towra Point was officially made a nature reserve. In 1983 Towra was suffering from erosion – the Elephant's Trunk, a peninsula of Towra had shrunk to 3 metres wide. The seagrasses were also being eaten by sea-urchins – the population had exploded from 20,000 per hectare in 1979 to 80,000 by 1983. It was declared a Ramsar site (or wetland of international importance) in 1984, at the time meeting Ramsar criteria 1, 2, 3 and 6. In 2009, Towra Point met Ramsar criteria 2, 3, 4 and 8. In 1987, the Towra Point Aquatic Nature Reserve was created, covering 1,400 hectares (3,500 acres) in the waterways surrounding Towra Point. Towra Point Nature Reserve also attempts to meet the Federal government's obligations to CAMBA, which came into force in 1988.

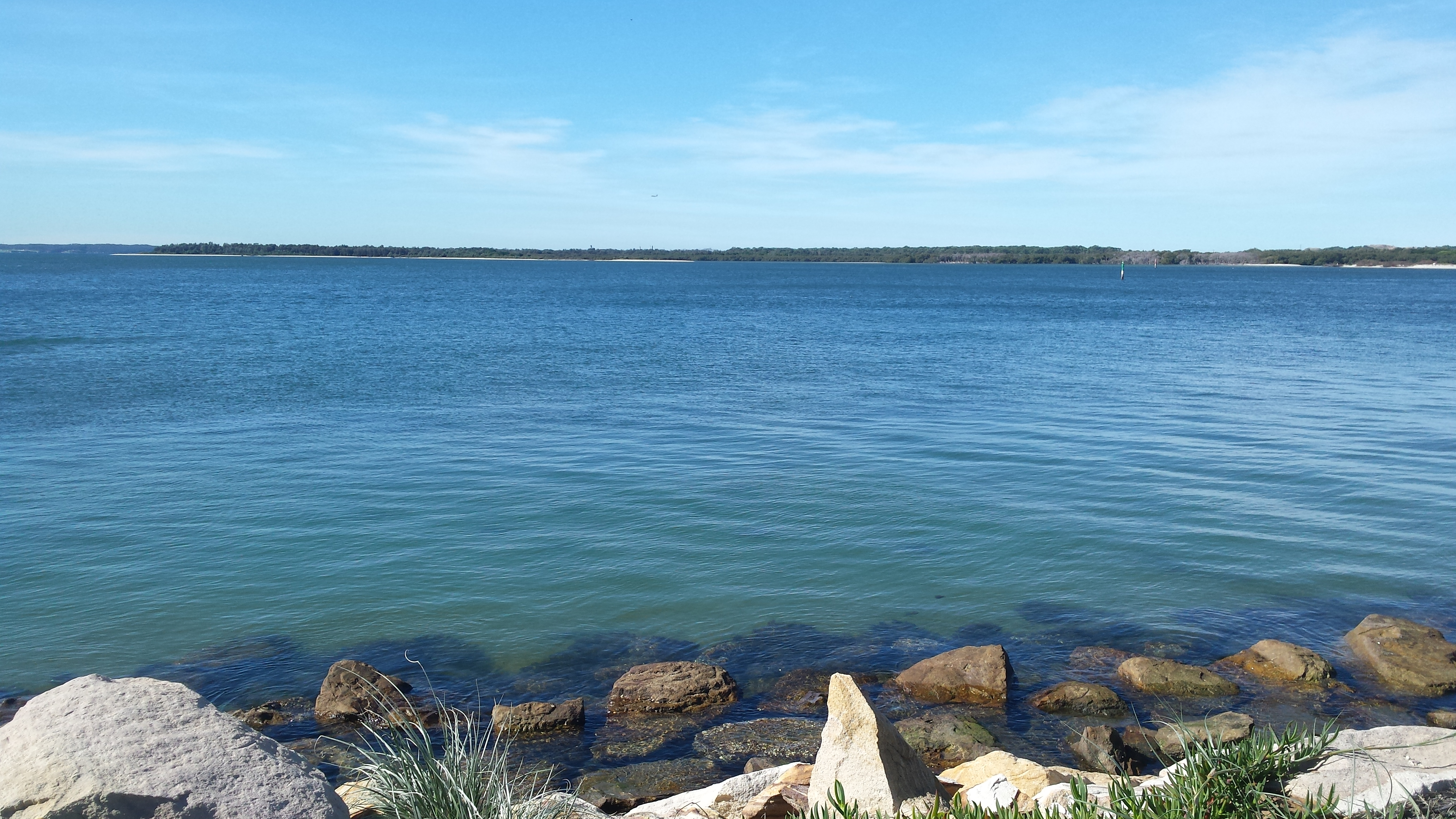
Looking across towards Towra Point Nature Reserve from Sandringham, New South Wales

In 1990, the Elephant's Trunk was eroded so much that the tip broke off into an island. By this time, Towra Beach was so eroded that trees that were part of the forest were "tumbling into the water". The Friends of Towra Point volunteer group was founded in February 1997 and they do such activities as bush regeneration, seed collection, vegetation surveys and habitat creation for the little tern. They also coordinate the annual Clean Up Australia Day activities at Towra Point. Habitat creation involves sandbagging the eroding Towra Lagoon, nest tagging, and clearing areas around nests.

In 2003, it was proposed to undertake beach nourishment at Towra Point, involving 60,000 cubic metres of sand. While this had an immediate negative effect on some amphipod species, they had recovered by 2005. In January 2004, 24 little tern were killed after picnickers and a dog accidentally landed on Towra Spit Island. In 2004, a A$1.5 million dredging project was undertaken to cut off Towra Spit Island from the rest of Towra Point to provide a fox-free environment. In around 2007, the La Perouse Aboriginal Community began sending trainees to work in the area for the NSW National Parks & Wildlife Service as part of the "Towra Team", combining bush regeneration work with learning traditional Aboriginal cultural skills.

In 2010, artificial roosting posts were installed by the Office of Environment & Heritage to supplement the roosting habitat in the area. In the 2010 breeding season, 72 little tern fledged. In 2012, the site received a "Grey Globe" award of shame, given to Ramsar sites that are considered to be under threat. In 2013, the Botany Bay National Park and 800 hectares (2,000 acres) of land including Towra Point Nature Reserve were to be included on the State Heritage Register.

== Habitats ==
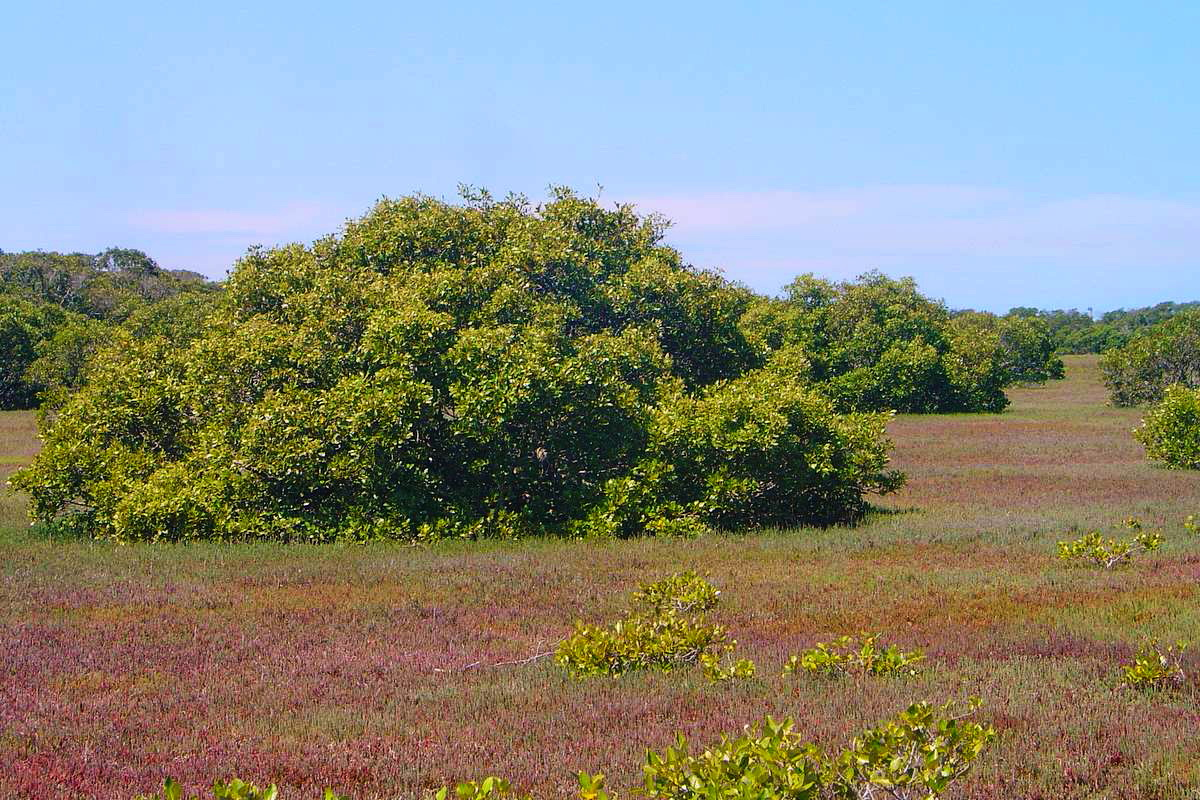
Saltmarsh and mangroves make up a large part of Towra Point Nature Reserve.

Towra Point, atop an ancient river delta deposit, has many distinct habitats – these diverse habitats are part of why Towra Point is a Ramsar site. The habitats of the reserve are:

- Salt marshes
- Mangroves
- Littoral rainforests
- Turpentine forests
- Lagoons
- Beaches

In 2001, the mangrove forests of Towra Point were described as varying in width between tens and hundreds of metres and largely consisting of the grey mangrove Avicennia marina with the river mangrove Aegiceras corniculatum growing in patches along the edge of the forest closest to the landward edge.

== Species ==
Towra Point Nature Reserve is home to many endangered, vulnerable, protected and exotic species. This list is from the NSW Government's Environment and Heritage department website – a comprehensive listing, including numbers, scientific names, and protection status, can be found at this link.

=== Birds ===
- Yellow thornbill
- Brown thornbill
- Striated fieldwren
- Chestnut-rumped heathwren
- Mangrove gerygone
- Brown gerygone
- White-browed scrubwren
- Brown goshawk
- Grey goshawk
- Swamp harrier
- Black-shouldered kite
- White-bellied sea eagle
- Chestnut teal
- Grey teal
- Australasian shoveler
- Black swan
- Pacific black duck
- Hardhead
- Musk duck
- Australian wood duck
- Australian shelduck
- Australasian darter
- Oriental darter
- Great egret
- Cattle egret
- Intermediate egret
- Little egret
- White-faced heron
- Eastern reef egret
- Grey butcherbird
- Pied currawong
- Bush stone-curlew
- Black-faced cuckooshrike
- Double-banded plover
- Greater sand plover
- Pacific golden plover
- Grey plover
- White-throated treecreeper
- Bar-shouldered dove
- Dollarbird
- Australian raven
- Fan-tailed cuckoo
- Shining bronze cuckoo
- Spangled drongo
- Leaden flycatcher
- Grey fantail
- Willie wagtail
- Red-browed finch
- Australian hobby
- Peregrine falcon
- Sooty oystercatcher
- Australian pied oystercatcher
- Sacred kingfisher
- Welcome swallow
- Silver gull
- Little tern
- Crested tern
- Caspian tern
- Arctic tern
- Superb fairywren
- Variegated fairywren
- Southern emu-wren
- Eastern spinebill
- Little wattlebird
- White-fronted chat
- Brown honeyeater
- New Holland honeyeater
- Australian pipit
- Eurasian blackbird
- Grey shrike-thrush
- Rufous whistler
- Spotted pardalote
- Australian pelican
- Eastern yellow robin
- Little pied cormorant
- Little black cormorant
- Great cormorant
- Pied cormorant
- Stubble quail
- Hoary-headed grebe
- Blue-winged parrot
- Eastern rosella
- Crimson rosella
- Red-whiskered bulbul
- Lewin's rail
- Sharp-tailed sandpiper
- Curlew sandpiper
- Great knot
- Bar-tailed godwit
- Eastern curlew
- Little curlew
- Eurasian whimbrel
- Common greenshank
- Common starling
- Golden-headed cisticola
- Royal spoonbill
- Glossy ibis
- Australian white ibis
- Painted buttonquail
- Silvereye
- Whistling kite
- Striated heron
- Australian magpie
- Sulphur-crested cockatoo
- Galah
- Masked lapwing
- Mistletoebird
- Magpie-lark
- Restless flycatcher
- Kookaburra
- Kelp gull
- Yellow-faced honeyeater
- Lewin's honeyeater
- White-naped honeyeater
- Olive-backed oriole
- Golden whistler
- House sparrow
- Rose robin
- Tawny frogmouth
- Rainbow lorikeet
- Southern boobook
- Common myna
- Tawny grassbird
- Australian masked owl
- Brown quail
- Great crested grebe
- Australasian grebe
- Rock dove
- Brown cuckoo-dove
- Crested pigeon
- Spotted turtle dove
- White-throated needletail
- Little penguin
- Australasian bittern
- Nankeen night heron

=== Amphibians ===
- Green and golden bell frog
- Keferstein's tree frog
- Common eastern froglet
- Striped marsh frog
- Peron's tree frog
- Jervis Bay tree frog

=== Mammals ===
- Dingo
- Dog
- Fox
- Dugong
- Rabbit
- House mouse
- Brown rat
- Black rat
- Cat
- Common brushtail possum
- Grey-headed flying fox
- Lesser long-eared bat
- Greater broad-nosed bat
- Little forest bat

=== Reptiles ===
- Jacky lashtail
- Eastern snake-necked turtle
- Red-bellied black snake
- Eastern small-eyed snake
- Black-bellied swamp snake
- Dark-flecked garden sunskink
- Pale-flecked garden sunskink
- Yellow-bellied three-toed skink
- Eastern bluetongue
- Robust ctenotus
- Eastern water-skink
- Barred-sided skink
- Weasel skink

=== Plants ===
- Grey mangrove
- Sickle fern
- New Zealand spinach
- Parrot alstroemeria
- Fennel
- Moth vine
- Milk vine
- Common silkpod
- Fruit salad plant
- Arum lily
- English ivy
- Asparagus fern
- Bridal creeper
- Crofton weed
- Cobbler's pegs
- Boneseed
- Bitou bush
- Swamp oak
- Native wandering jew
- Tree broom-heath
- Coffee bush
- Wombat berry
- Port Jackson fig/rusty fig
- Cockspur thorn
- Muttonwood
- Swamp paperbark
- Broad-leaved paperbark
- Pixie caps
- Inkweed
- Sweet pittosporum
- Pampas grass
- Panic veldtgrass
- Rambling dock
- Coastal banksia
- Tuckeroo
- Slender grape
- Lantana
- Nightshade
- Black-berry
- Wild olive
- Samphire
- Magenta lilly pilly

== Human effects ==
The ecosystem surrounding Towra Point has been impacted as a result of human interaction.

=== Positive effects ===
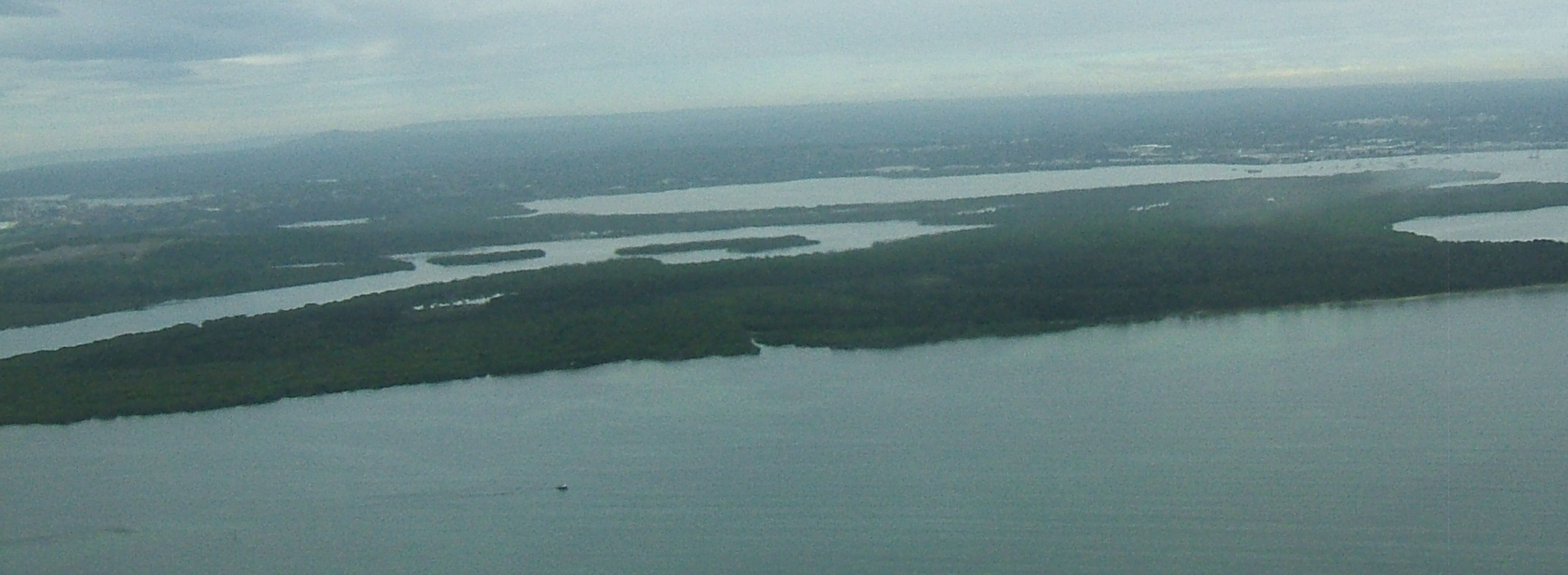
Looking west from the air over Towra Point

Humans can maximise the area of healthy, functioning intertidal wetlands by minimising their impacts and by developing management strategies that protect, and where possible rehabilitate these ecosystems at risk.

The following are positive ways of trying to protect or rehabilitate intertidal wetlands.

- Exclusion – Those responsible for the management of wetland areas often facilitate public access to a small, designated area while restricting access to other areas. Provision of defined boardwalks and walkways is a management strategy used to restrict access to vulnerable areas, as is the issuing of permits whilst visiting Towra Point Nature Reserve.
- Education – In the past, wetlands were regarded as waste-lands. Education campaigns have helped to change public perceptions and foster public support for the wetlands. Due to their location in the water catchment area, education programs need to teach about total catchment management programs. Educational programs include guided tours for the general public, school visits, media liaison, information centres, conference presentations, interpretive signage, publications and facts sheets. Staff should also include education officers.
- Action – too little is known about the intertidal wetland system to successfully reinstate all natural conditions. Management plans focus on the rehabilitation of the site and the removal of human-induced stresses. For example, fox and rabbit baiting, removal of weeds (at Weedy Pond).
- Design – Design interventions have proved successful in minimising sources of natural stress. At Towra Point Beach, for example, there is a sandbag wall to help prevent salt water from leaking into the fresh-water Towra Lagoon.
- Legislation – Legislation and regulations are used to protect Towra Point Wetlands. Conventions that Australia has signed in regard to Towra Point Wetlands are the Ramsar Convention, the Japan–Australia Migratory Bird Agreement and the China–Australia Migratory Bird Agreement (CAMBA). Legislation that Australia and New South Wales have passed in regard to Towra Point Wetlands are the Australian Wetlands Policy, the New South Wales Wetlands Management Policy (1996) and the State and Environmental Planning Policy 14 on Coastal Wetlands.

=== Negative effects ===
- Changed wind patterns – due to high-rise near some wetland areas e.g. Bicentennial Park South, at Rockdale.
- Alteration of water flows – through construction of roads.
- Removal of resources for urban and industrial land uses – These also increase turbidity and toxins in the water supplied to mangroves. (The removal can also result in changed energy flows and nutrient cycles, affecting food chains for both sedentary and migratory fauna)
- Replacement of wetland areas – for parks, playing fields or pasture.
- Destruction of sea grasses – in areas adjoining wetlands can affect energy flows and nutrient cycles as species levels will be affected.
- Introduction of exotic species – e.g. foxes, rabbits, sheep, cattle, pigs. – change energy flows and nutrient cycles. Birds are particularly affected, for example the little tern.
- Indirect influences from adjacent sites – e.g. weed infestation (lantana – Towra Point) – carried into the wetlands by horses from the nearby stables.
- Trampling – from illegal access
- Threat of oil spills – Kurnell Refinery near Towra Point, 31 oil spills between 1957 and 1987 averaging 49,000 litres (11,000 imp gal; 13,000 US gal).
- Recreational horse riding – on the reserve and unsupervised recreational use of the reserve (e.g. dog walking)
- Boating – disturbs wildlife in the park, and creates pollution.
- Fishing – kills fish, which affects the food chains operating within the reserve.
- Erosion of Towra Beach – due to wave refraction from the Sydney Airport runway which causes the freshwater Towra Point Lagoon to become saline
- Fragmentation of the reserve – by private land ownership
- Bay development – in general, including the Sydney Airport runway and the oil refinery. There have also been concerns that the Sydney Desalination Plant will impact negatively on the reserve.
- Illegal rubbish dumping – has occurred both in the reserve and near the entrance. In late 2004, a large amount of dumped asbestos was discovered.
- Land destabilisation – due to extensive mining of the larger dunes on Towra Point during the twentieth century it has been suggested that if the site was ravaged by strong enough storms breaks in the point could occur and breach the gentle lagoons of Towra Point.
- Runoff – due to most of the surrounding land being used for urban and industrial purposes. Stormwater from the Kurnell Refinery runs through the Ramsar-listed area of Towra Point Nature Reserve.
- Subsidence – near the walkway, subsidence has been recorded, which has encouraged the establishment of mangroves in the upper swamp.

== Management of the reserve ==
=== Traditional ===
The traditional objectives for the management of wetland areas were built around the use of wetland resources for food, shelter and tools. Grey mangrove wood, for example, was used to make shields, shells were made into fishing hooks; and marine animals were used for food.

=== Contemporary ===
- Identify management goals and objectives – Today management plans for wetlands focus on the preservation and sustainable use of sites for recreation, conservation and education purposes. This may involve some exclusion zones but many areas are open to recreational and educational activities.
- Define management unit and boundaries – The "management unit" for many intertidal wetlands is often difficult to define because of the large number of stakeholders. For example, the Towra Point wetland has input from NSW National Parks & Wildlife Service, NSW Fisheries, Sutherland Shire Council, Friends of Towra Point and recreational users.
- Develop and implement management plans – An intertidal wetland is a dynamic system. As our knowledge of ecosystems has increased community attitudes have changed. Communities are now demanding that these ecosystems are protected and effectively managed.

Care has been taken to develop management plans that are both realistic and flexible. They need to take into account scientific and technological advances, changing social and political attitudes and variations in the level of funding. Management plans also need to be consistent with Australia's international obligations under JAMBA, CAMBA and Ramsar.

== Applicable legislation and international environmental law ==
=== International environmental law ===
Ramsar Convention (1971), JAMBA (1981), Bonn Convention (1983), CAMBA (1988), ROKAMBA (2006), the Partnership for the Conservation of Migratory Waterbirds and the Sustainable Use of their Habitats in the East Asian–Australasian Flyway (2006), Convention on Biological Diversity (1992).

=== Federal environmental law ===
As the Towra Point area is Ramsar listed, this attracts the operation of the federal Environment Protection and Biodiversity Conservation Act 1999 and regulations. Section 17B provides that a person is guilty of a criminal offence if (a) the person takes an action [see:s.523]; and (b) the action results or will result in a significant impact on the ecological character of a wetland; and (c) the wetland is a declared Ramsar wetland. Towra Point Nature Reserve is listed a component of Littoral Rainforest and Coastal Vine Thickets of Eastern Australia, a critically endangered ecological community under the EPBC Act.

=== State environmental law ===
In addition to land use planning law, the following Acts are applicable National Parks and Wildlife Act 1974 (NSW), Environmental Planning and Assessment Act 1979 (NSW), Fisheries Management Act 1994 (NSW), Threatened Species Conservation Act 1995 (NSW) and applicable SEPPs (e.g. State Environmental Planning Policy No 39—Spit Island Bird Habitat). Following a review, several SEPPs were repealed in favour of using Local Environmental Plans.

Towra Point Nature Reserve has been listed as being part of the Coastal Dune Littoral Rainforest ecological community, an endangered ecological community under the TSC Act.
