= Republic of Korea–Australia Migratory Bird Agreement =

Conservation agreement between South Korea and Australia

The Republic of Korea–Australia Migratory Bird Agreement (ROKAMBA) is a bilateral treaty between Australia and the Republic of Korea regarding the conservation of migratory birds and their habitat. The agreement was signed in Canberra on 6 December 2006 and came into force on 13 July 2007.

Australia and the Republic of Korea both fall within the East Asian–Australasian Flyway, a migratory route used by more than 50 million migratory waterbirds each year, including a number of threatened species. Of these, 59 species are known to migrate between Australia and the Republic of Korea. The agreement aims to prevent harm to these birds and their environment through the prohibition of the taking or trading of listed birds and their eggs, the control of invasive species, the formation of joint research and conservation initiatives, and other such measures.

== Listed species ==
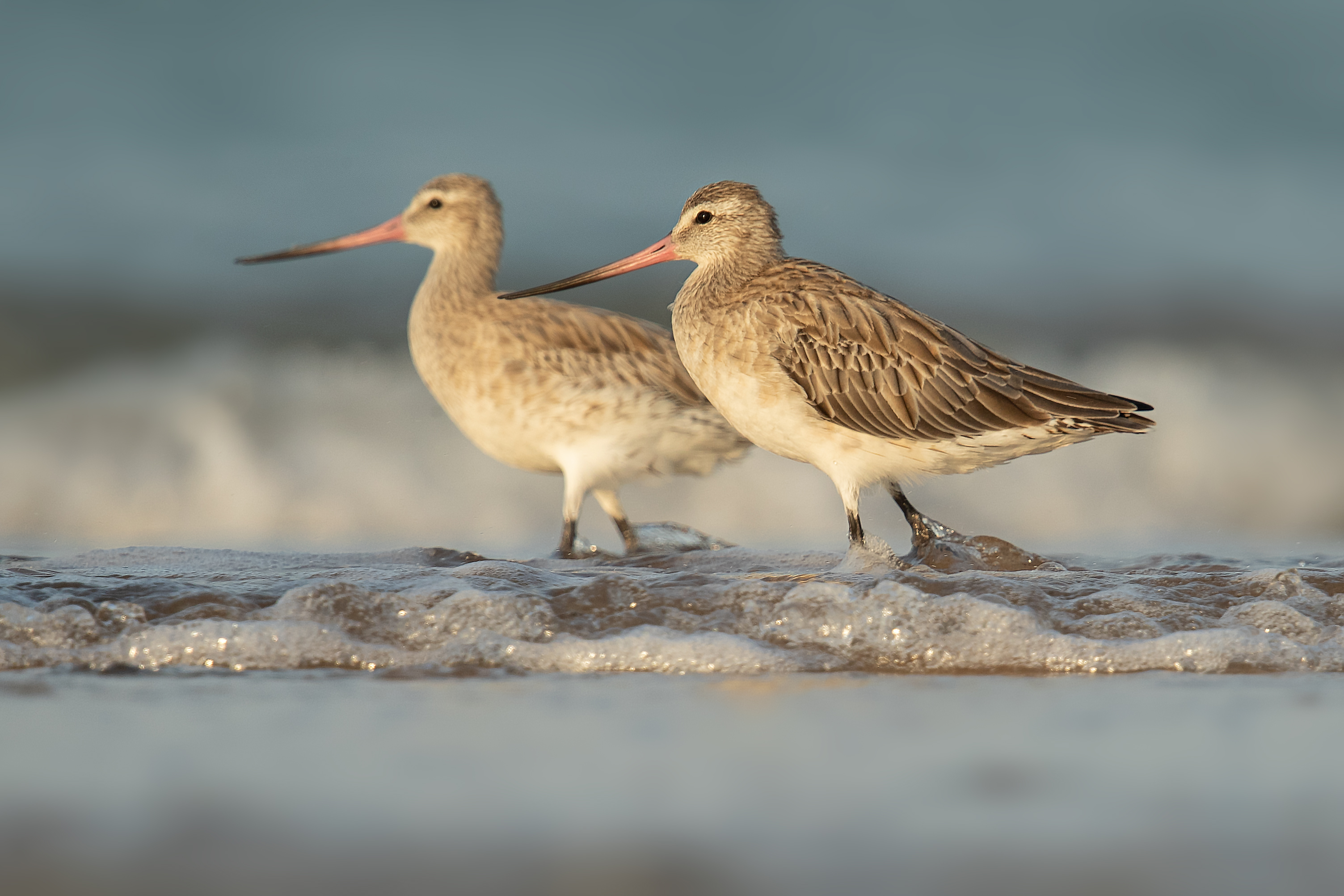
Bar-tailed godwits (Limosa lapponica) photographed at Lee Point, Northern Territory, Australia

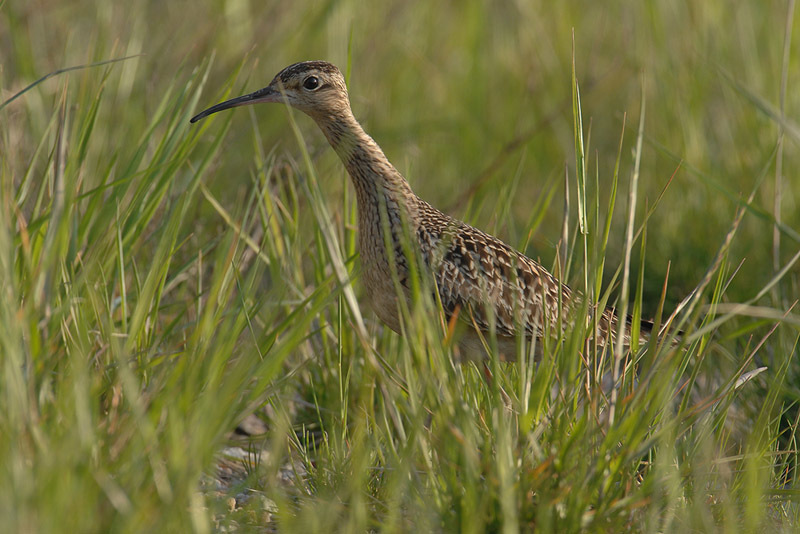
Little curlew (Numenius minutus) photographed in Taean County, South Korea

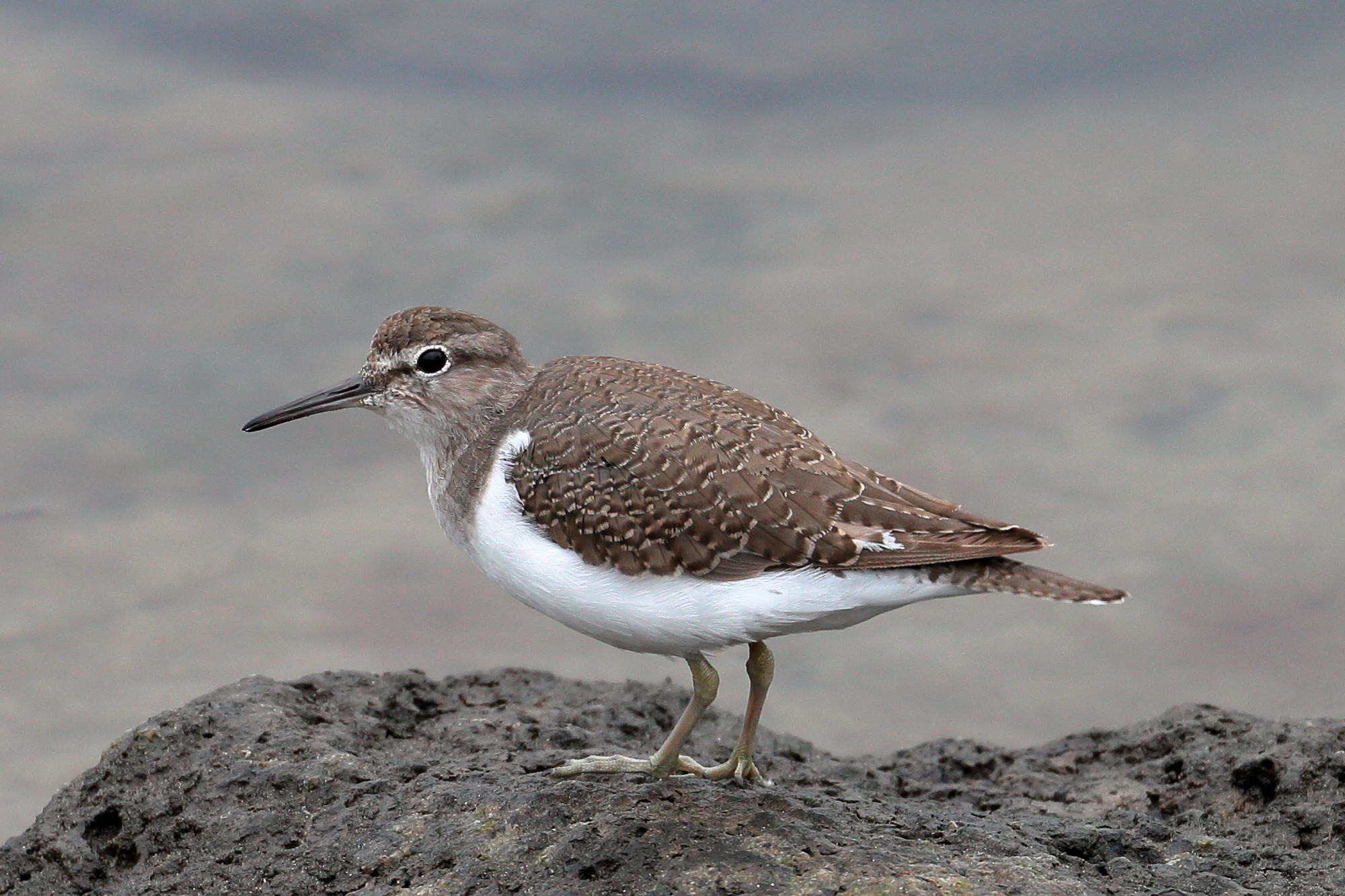
Common sandpiper (Actitis hypoleucos) photographed in Port Fairy, Victoria, Australia

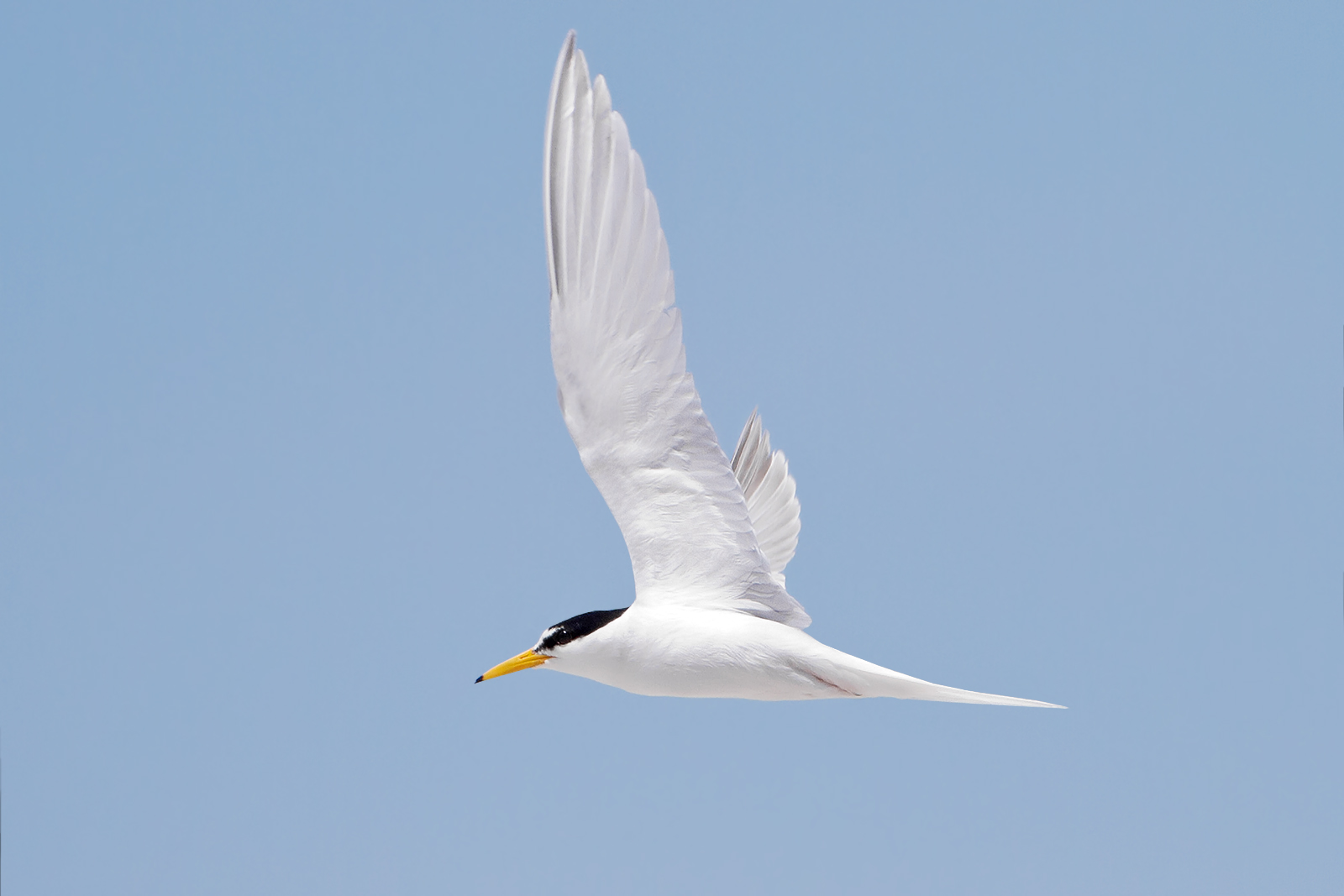
Little tern (Sternula albifrons) photographed in Little Swanport, Tasmania, Australia

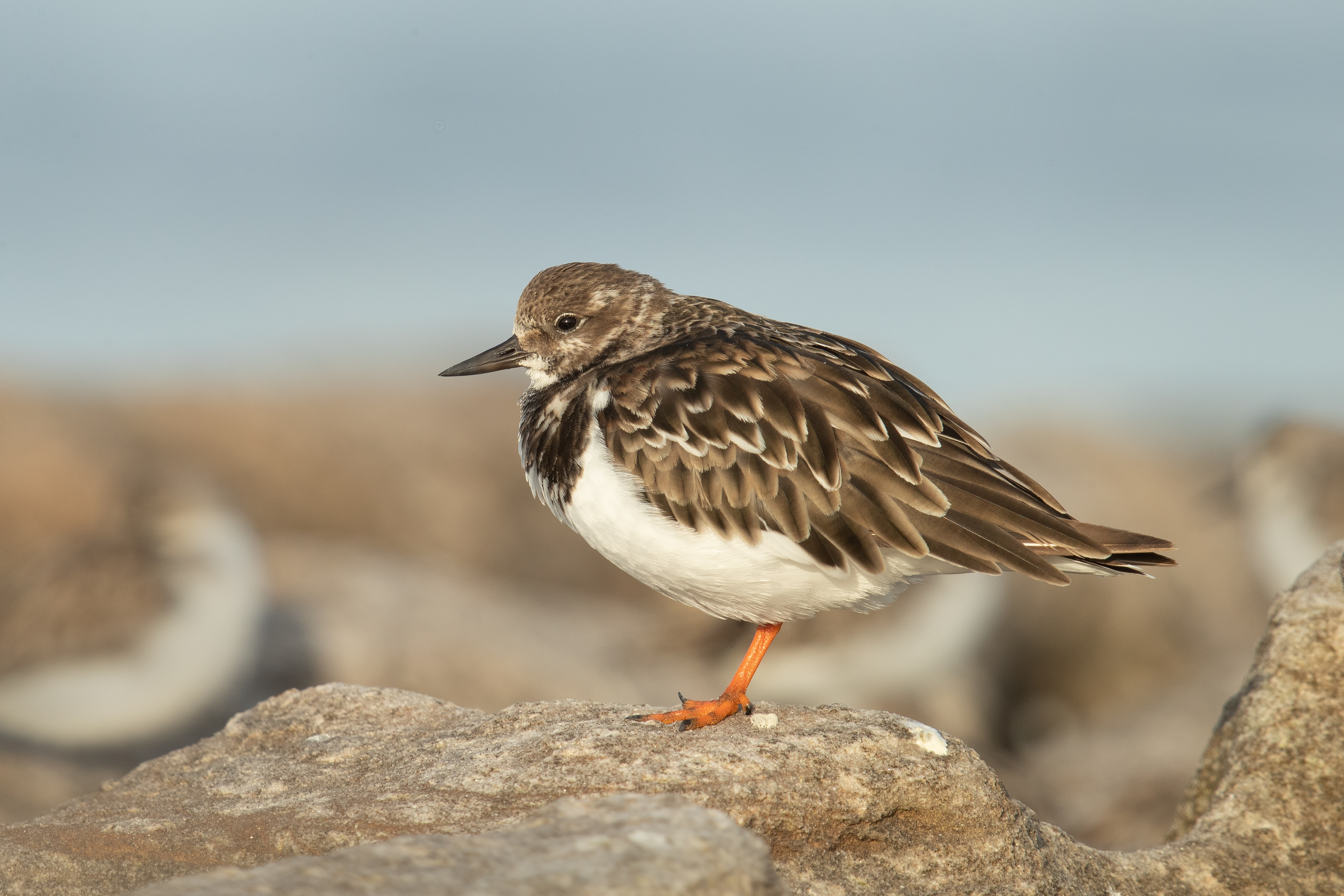
Ruddy turnstone (Arenaria interpres) photographed at Boat Harbour, New South Wales, Australia

Bird species listed in ROKAMBA
No.	Scientific name	Hangeul Name	English name
1	Anas clypeata	넓적부리	Shoveler (Northern shoveler)
2	Anas querquedula	발구지	Garganey
3	Cuculus saturatus	벙어리뻐꾸기	Oriental cuckoo / Himalayan cuckoo
4	Chaetura caudacuta (Hirundapus caudacutus)	바늘꼬리칼새	White-throated needle-tailed swift (White-throated needletail)
5	Apus pacificus	칼새	White-rumped swift (Fork-tailed swift) / Pacific swift
6	Gallinago hardwickii	큰꺅도요	Latham's snipe
7	Gallinago stenura	바늘꼬리도요	Pintail snipe (Pin-tailed snipe)
8	Gallinago megala	꺅도요사촌	Swinhoe's snipe
9	Limosa limosa	흑꼬리도요	Black-tailed godwit
10	Limosa lapponica	큰뒷부리도요	Bar-tailed godwit
11	Numenius minutus	쇠부리도요	Little curlew
12	Numenius phaeopus	중부리도요	Whimbrel
13	Numenius madagascariensis	알락꼬리마도요	Australian curlew (Eastern curlew)
14	Tringa totanus	붉은발도요	Redshank (Common redshank)
15	Tringa stagnatilis	쇠청다리도요	Marsh sandpiper
16	Tringa nebularia	청다리도요	Greenshank (Common greenshank)
17	Tringa glareola	알락도요	Wood sandpiper
18	Xenus cinereus	뒷부리도요	Terek sandpiper
19	Tringa hypoleucos (Acetitis hypoleucos)	깝작도요	Common sandpiper
20	Tringa brevipes (Heteroscelus brevipes)	노랑발도요	Grey-tailed tattler
21	Arenaria interpres	꼬까도요	Turnstone (Ruddy turnstone)
22	Limnodromus semipalmatus	큰부리도요	Asian dowitcher
23	Calidris tenuirostris	붉은어깨도요	Great knot
24	Calidris canutus	붉은가슴도요	Red knot
25	Crocethia alba (Calidris alba)	세가락도요	Sanderling
26	Calidris ruficollis	좀도요	Red-necked stint
27	Calidris minutilla(subminuta) (Calidris subminuta)	종달도요	Long-toed stint and Least sandpiper
28	Calidris minuta	작은도요	Little stint
29	Calidris melanotos	아메리카메추라기도요	Pectoral sandpiper
30	Calidris aeuminata	메추라기도요	Sharp-tailed sandpiper
31	Calidris alpina	민물도요	Dunlin
32	Calidris ferruginea	붉은갯도요	Curlew sandpiper
33	Tryngites subruficollis	누른도요	Buff-breasted sandpiper
34	Limicola falcinellus	송곳부리도요	Broad-billed sandpiper
35	Philomachus pugnax	목도리도요	Ruff
36	Phalaropus lobatus	지느러미발도요	Red-necked (northern) phalarope (Red-necked phalarope)
37	Pluvialis fulva	검은가슴물떼새	Pacific golden plover
38	Pluvialis squatarola	개꿩	Grey (Black-bellied) plover (Grey plover)
39	Charadrius hiaticula	흰죽지꼬마물떼새	Common ringed plover (Ringed plover)
40	Charadrius dubius	꼬마물떼새	Little ringed plover
41	Charadrius mongolus	왕눈물떼새	Mongolian plover (Lesser sand plover)
42	Charadrius leschenaultii	큰왕눈물떼새	Greater sand plover
43	Charadrius veredus	큰물떼새	Oriental plover
44	Glareola maldivarum	제비물떼새	Oriental pratincole
45	Stercorarius parasiticus	북극도둑갈매기	Parasitic jaeger (Arctic jaeger)
46	Sterna hirundo	제비갈매기	Common tern
47	Sterna albifrons	쇠제비갈매기	Little tern
48	Sterna leucoptera (Chlidonias leucopterus)	흰죽지갈매기	White-winged black tern / White-winged tern
49	Sula dactylatra	검은제비갈매기	Masked booby
50	Sula leucogaster	갈색얼가니새	Brown booby
51	Fregata ariel	군함조	Lesser frigatebird
52	Calonectris leucomelas	슴새	Streaked shearwater
53	Puffinus carneipes	붉은발슴새	Pale-footed shearwater (Flesh-footed Shearwater)
54	Puffinus tenuirostris	쇠부리슴새	Slender-billed shearwater (Short-tailed Shearwater)
55	Hirundo rustica	제비	House swallow (Barn swallow)
56	Hirundo daurica	귀제비	Red-rumped swallow
57	Acrocephalus arundinaceus (Acrocephalus orientalis)	개개비	Great reed warbler and Oriental reed-warbler
58	Motacilla flava	긴발톱할미새	Yellow wagtail / Western yellow wagtail
59	Motacilla cinerea	노랑할미새	Grey wagtail

== See also ==
- Bonn Convention
- Convention on Biological Diversity
- China–Australia Migratory Bird Agreement
- East Asian – Australasian Flyway
- Environment Protection and Biodiversity Conservation Act 1999
- Japan–Australia Migratory Bird Agreement
- List of international environmental agreements
