= Japan–Australia Migratory Bird Agreement =

1974 treaty between Australia and Japan

The Japan Australia Migratory Bird Agreement (JAMBA) is a treaty between Australia and Japan to minimise harm to the major areas used by birds which migrate between the two countries. JAMBA was first developed on 6 February 1974 and came into force on 30 April 1981.

JAMBA provides for cooperation between Japan and Australia on measures for the management and protection of migratory birds, birds in danger of extinction, and the management and protection of their environments, and requires each country to take appropriate measures to preserve and enhance the environment of birds protected under the provisions of the agreement.

== Listed species ==
The treaty lists 66 species of birds, as per the table below.

Birds listed in JAMBA
No.	Common name	Species
1	Streaked shearwater	Calonectris leucomelas
2	Wedge-tailed shearwater	Puffinus pacificus
3	Flesh-footed shearwater	Puffinus carneipes
4	Sooty shearwater	Puffinus griseus
5	Short-tailed shearwater	Puffinus tenuirostris
6	Wilson's storm petrel	Oceanites oceanicus
7	Leach's storm petrel	Oceanodroma leucorhoa
8	White-tailed tropicbird	Phaethon lepturus
9	Brown booby	Sula leucogaster
10	Masked booby	Sula dactylatra
11	Red-footed booby	Sula sula
12	Greater frigatebird	Fregata minor
13	Lesser frigatebird	Fregata ariel
14	Western cattle egret	Bubulcus ibis
15	White egret / Great egret	Egretta alba
16	Garganey teal / Garganey	Anas querquedula
17	Ringed plover / Common ringed plover	Charadrius hiaticula
18	Mongolian sand-dotterel / Lesser sand plover	Charadrius mongolus
19	Large sand-dotterel / Greater sand plover	Charadrius leschenaultii
20	Oriental dotterel / Caspian plover	Charadrius asiaticus
21	Eastern golden plover / American golden plover	Pluvialis dominica
22	Grey plover	Pluvialis squatarola
23	Ruddy Turnstone	Arenaria interpres
24	Red-necked stint	Calidris ruficollis
25	Long-toed stint & Least sandpiper	Calidris minutilla (including Calidris subminuta)
26	Baird's sandpiper	Calidris bairdii
27	Pectoral sandpiper	Calidris melanotos
28	Sharp-tailed sandpiper	Calidris acuminata
29	Curlew sandpiper	Calidris ferruginea
30	Knot / Red knot	Calidris canutus
31	Great knot	Calidris tenuirostris
32	Sanderling	Crocethia alba
33	Ruff (Reeve)	Philomachus pugnax
34	Buff-breasted sandpiper	Tryngites subruficollis
35	Broad-billed sandpiper	Limicola falcinellus
36	Little greenshank / Marsh sandpiper	Tringa stagnatilis
37	Greenshank / Common greenshank	Tringa nebularia
38	Wood sandpiper	Tringa glareola
39	Grey-tailed tattler	Tringa brevipes
40	Wandering tattler	Tringa incana
41	Common sandpiper	Tringa hypoleucos
42	Terek sandpiper	Xenus cinereus
43	Black-tailed godwit	Limosa limosa
44	Bar-tailed godwit	Limosa lapponica
45	Far Eastern curlew	Numenius madagascariensis
46	Whimbrel / Eurasian whimbrel	Numenius phaeopus
47	Little whimbrel / Little curlew	Numenius minutus
48	Pin-tailed snipe / Swinhoe's snipe	Gallinago megala
49	Japanese snipe / Latham's snipe	Gallinago hardwickii
50	Red-necked phalarope	Phalaropus lobatus
51	Oriental pratincole / Collared pratincole	Glareola pratincola
52	South-polar skua / Great skua	Stercorarius skua
53	Pomarine skua / Pomarine jaeger	Stercorarius pomarinus
54	Arctic skua / Parasitic jaeger	Stercorarius parasiticus
55	White-winged black tern / White-winged tern	Chlidonias leucoptera
56	Greater crested tern	Sterna bergii
57	Asiatic common tern / Common tern	Sterna hirundo
58	Black-naped tern	Sterna sumatrana
59	Bridled tern	Sterna anaethetus
60	Little tern	Sterna albifrons
61	Brown noddy	Anous stolidus
62	Oriental cuckoo / Himalayan cuckoo	Cuculus saturatus
63	Spine-tailed swift / White-throated needletail	Chaetura caudacuta (Hirundapus caudacutus)
64	Fork-tailed swift / Pacific swift	Apus pacificus
65	Barn swallow	Hirundo rustica
66	Western yellow wagtail	Motacilla flava

== See also ==
- Convention on Biological Diversity
- List of international environmental agreements
- Environment Protection and Biodiversity Conservation Act 1999
- China–Australia Migratory Bird Agreement
- Republic of Korea–Australia Migratory Bird Agreement
- Bonn Convention
- East Asian – Australasian Flyway
