= China–Australia Migratory Bird Agreement =

Bilateral treaty

CAMBA
China–Australia Migratory Bird Agreement
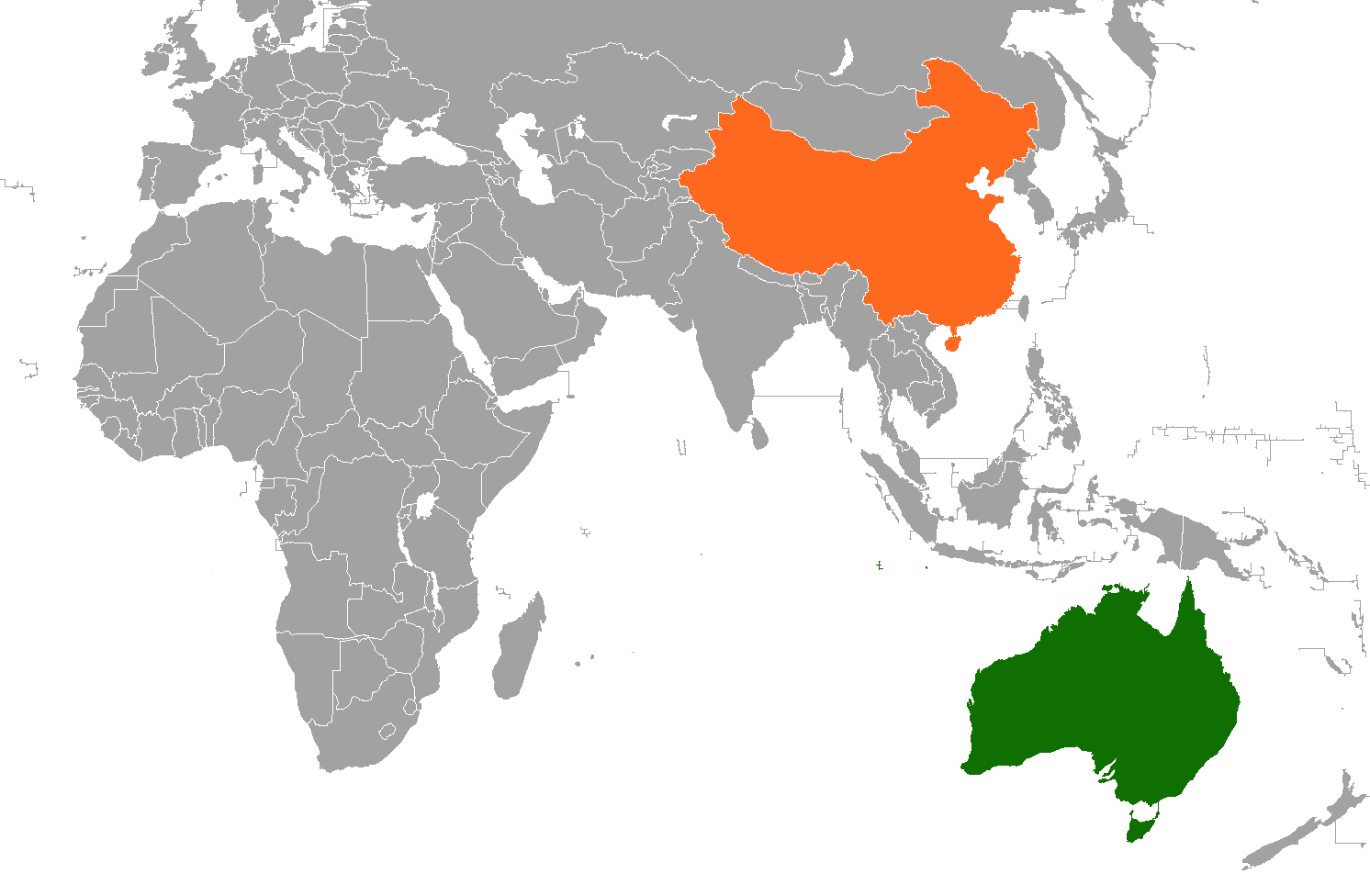
- Drafted: 20 October 1986
- Location: Canberra
- Effective: 1 September 1988
- Parties: Australia; China
- Languages: English; Chinese

The China–Australia Migratory Bird Agreement (CAMBA) is a bilateral treaty between Australia and China that aims to protect migratory birds and their environment between the two countries. Throughout all six Articles, the treaty defines what a migratory bird is, outlines key prohibitions for both contracting parties and determines the responsibilities of both nations to protect migratory birds and their habitats. The CAMBA was first developed on 20 October 1986, and came into force on 1 September 1988. Eighty-one bird species are listed in the agreement, as shown in the CAMBA Annex listed below.

The CAMBA was developed to provide more legal protection for migratory birds, especially those that are critically endangered or are at threat of extinction. Both China and Australia have agreed to encourage the creation of programs to support the protection of bird species, to share any information like research on these birds and to ensure conservation such as by preventing the importation of hazardous plants and animals.

Australia has been involved with other migratory bird agreements such as the Japan-Australia Migratory Bird Agreement (JAMBA) and the Republic of Korea-Australia Migratory Bird Agreement (ROKAMBA), and also with management plans that aim to combat key threats such as climate change and water extraction which have proven to harm bird species. There are also issues associated with migratory bird protection which limits the effectiveness of protecting these species, including the lack of specificity in agreements and difficulties in implementing conservatory measures at a domestic level.

== Agreement articles ==
=== Article I ===
Article I defines the term "migratory bird" as a bird that is sufficiently proven to be migrating between China and Australia and those determined by "published reports, photographs and other information". This Article then states that both contracting parties, being Australia and China, must review the Annex and are given the ability to potentially amend the Agreement upon mutual agreement. This Article provides opportunities for both contracting parties to amend the CAMBA which has occurred before at the 7th Consultative Meeting between Australia and China on 26 May 2006. The amendments included altering the scientific nomenclature of 17 species in the Annex as well adding the Roseate Tern and removing the Painted Snipe.

=== Article II ===
Article II prohibits both China and Australia from taking either migratory birds or their eggs unless otherwise permitted in the domestic laws of the respective country given certain circumstances. Some of these circumstances include if such actions are for: "scientific, educational, propagative" or other purposes that align with the motives of the Agreement, the reason is to protect people or property or it is during hunting season as established in Article II. For instance, the Department of Primary Industries, Parks, Water and Environment has permitted Tasmanian Aboriginal individuals to harvest shearwaters, which is a historic part of their muttonbirding tradition. This Article further states that both parties shall not sell, purchase or exchange migratory birds or eggs, but may determine a criterion for hunting these birds given reproduction rates needed for survival. During the 2010 to 2011 and 2013 to 2014 breeding seasons, cultural harvesting for Tasmanian Aboriginals was terminated to ensure bird populations returned to their original levels.

=== Article III ===
Article III lists three binding statements that both contracting parties are recommended to do. The first states that both nations are encouraged to share information related to the research on migratory birds. The second encourages both parties to create "joint research programs" focused on migratory birds. Lastly, both parties should promote the protection of migratory birds, specifically those that are exposed to extinction. The National Avian Influenza Wild Bird (NAIWB) Surveillance Program is an Australian initiative that includes sampling Anseriformes to monitor influenza viruses. This program provides information to better improve Australia's understanding of avian influenza in wild birds to protect against environmental and social impacts of diseases.

=== Article IV ===
Article IV asserts that both contracting parties must, to the best of their ability: create facilities that protect migratory birds, take necessary steps to preserve and improve the environment of these birds, prevent any harm to both the birds and their environment and monitor and control any animals or plants that are imported that may pose a risk. In preventing harm and improving the environments of the listed birds, Australia and China considered removing the Painted Snipe from the Annex as they were found to be a different species than those that were in Asia. However, it is already a threatened species listed under the Environment Protection and Biodiversity Conservation Act (1999) and was found that it will not lessen the protection to that species and its environment.

=== Article V ===
This Article simply states that if either China or Australia request so, both parties must consult in relation to the operation of the Agreement.

=== Article VI ===
Article VI outlines that the Agreement will be enacted once both countries notify one another and sign the Agreement. It will be in force for 15 years and either party can give the other party 1 year's notice to terminate the Agreement after this period of time.

Bird Species Listed in the CAMBA Annex
No.	Common name	Species name
1	Streaked shearwater	Puffinus leucomelas (Calonectris leucomelas)
2	Sooty shearwater	Puffinus griseus
3	Leach's storm-petrel	Oceanodroma leucorhoa
4	White-tailed tropicbird	Phaethon lepturus
5	Red-footed booby	Sula sula
6	Brown booby	Sula leucogaster
7	Great frigatebird	Fregata minor
8	Andrew's frigatebird / Christmas frigatebird	Fregata andrewsi
9	Least frigatebird / Lesser frigatebird	Fregata ariel
10	Western cattle egret & Cattle egret	Bubulcus ibis (Ardeola ibis)
11	Great egret	Egretta alba
12	Eastern reef egret / Pacific reef heron	Egretta sacra
13	Yellow bittern	Ixobrychus sinensis
14	Glossy ibis	Plegadis falcinellus
15	Garganey	Anas querquedula
16	Northern shoveler	Anas clypeata
17	White-bellied sea-eagle	Haliaeetus leucogaster
18	Sarus crane	Grus antigone
19	Red-legged crake	Rallina fasciata
20	Corn crake	Crex crex
21	Pheasant-tailed jacana	Hydrophasianus chirurgus
22	Painted snipe / Greater painted snipe	Rostratula benghalensis
23	Grey plover	Pluvialis squatarola
24	Lesser golden plover / American golden plover	Pluvialis dominica
25	Ringed plover / Common ringed plover	Charadrius hiaticula
26	Little ringed plover	Charadrius dubius
27	Mongolian plover / Lesser sand plover	Charadrius mongolus
28	Large sand-plover / Greater sand plover	Charadrius leschenaultii
29	Caspian plover	Charadrius asiaticus
30	Little curlew & Eskimo curlew	Numenius borealis (Numenius minutus)
31	Whimbrel / Eurasian whimbrel	Numenius phaeopus
32	Eurasian curlew	Numenius arquata
33	Eastern curlew / Far Eastern curlew	Numenius madagascariensis
34	Black-tailed godwit	Limosa limosa
35	Bar-tailed godwit	Limosa lapponica
36	Redshank / Common redshank	Tringa totanus
37	Marsh sandpiper	Tringa stagnatilis
38	Greenshank / Common greenshank	Tringa nebularia
39	Wood sandpiper	Tringa glareola
40	Common sandpiper	Tringa hypoleucos
41	Grey-tailed tattler & Wandering tattler	Tringa incana (Tringa brevipes)
42	Terek sandpiper	Xenus cinereus (Tringa terek)
43	Ruddy turnstone	Arenaria interpres
44	Asian dowitcher	Limnodromus semipalmatus
45	Latham's snipe	Capella hardwickii (Gallinago hardwickii)
46	Pin-tailed snipe	Capella stenura (Gallinago stenura)
47	Swinhoe's snipe	Capella megala (Gallinago megala)
48	Red knot	Calidris canutus
49	Great knot	Calidris tenuirostris
50	Red-necked stint	Calidris ruficollis
51	Long-toed stint	Calidris subminuta
52	Sharp-tailed sandpiper	Calidris acuminata
53	Dunlin	Calidris alpina
54	Curlew sandpiper	Calidris ferruginea
55	Sanderling	Crocethia alba (Calidris alba)
56	Broad-billed sandpiper	Limicola falcinellus
57	Ruff	Philomachus pugnax
58	Red-necked phalarope	Phalaropus lobatus
59	Grey phalarope / Red phalarope	Phaloropus fulicarius
60	Oriental pratincole	Glareola maldivarum
61	Pomarine jaeger	Stercorarius pomarinus
62	White-winged tern	Chlidonias leucoptera
63	Black tern	Chlidonias niger
64	Caspian tern	Hydropogne tschegrava (Hydroprogne caspia)
65	Common tern	Sterna hirundo
66	Black-naped tern	Sterna sumatrana
67	Bridled tern	Sterna anaethetus
68	Little tern	Sterna albifrons
69	Lesser crested tern	Thalasseus bengalensis (Sterna bengalensis)
70	Common noddy / Brown noddy	Anous stolidus
71	Oriental cuckoo / Himalayan cuckoo	Cuculus saturatus
72	White-throated needletail	Hirundapus caudacutus
73	Fork-tailed swift / Pacific swift	Apus pacificus
74	Barn swallow	Hirundo rustica
75	Greater striated swallow / Striated swallow	Hirundo striolata
76	Yellow wagtail / Western yellow wagtail	Motacilla flava
77	Yellow-headed wagtail / Citrine wagtail	Motacilla citreola
78	Grey wagtail	Motacilla cinerea
79	White wagtail	Motacilla alba
80	Great reed-warbler	Acrocephalus arundinaceus
81	Arctic willow warbler / Arctic warbler	Phylloscopus borealis

== Australia's migratory bird protection history ==
Australia has been a critical nation in protecting migratory birds by taking conservatory measures in the East Asian – Australasian Flyway since the mid-1970s. Australia has made bilateral migratory bird agreements with several Asian countries. It started with Japan (JAMBA) in 1974, China (CAMBA) in 1986 and the Republic of Korea (ROKAMBA) over 15 years ago in 2006.

As well as these bilateral agreements, Australia is a signatory to the Convention on Wetlands of International Importance, more commonly known as the Ramsar Convention. This intergovernmental treaty primarily focuses on the conservation of wetlands by ensuring environmental maintenance and ecological sustainability. The Ramsar Strategic Plan (2009–2015) outlines outcomes to be achieved for the Ramsar Convention. First, there should be an increase in engagement within local communities and awareness of the importance of wetlands on ecosystems. Second, international coordination with the Ramsar Convention must be maintained to achieve an international wetland network. Thirdly, there should be a focus on cooperating with international parties to maximise the impact of the agreement.

Further, as a member since 2006, Australia's membership in the East Asian – Australasian Flyway Site Network which was established in 1996 has assisted the encouragement and implementation of more effective conservatory measures for migratory birds. Also, Australia is part of the Convention on the Conservation of Migratory Species of Wild Animals which is an environmental treaty as part of the United Nations which aims to improve international coordination of migratory bird conservation.

In more recent developments according to The Australian Government Department of the Environment and Energy, Australia has demonstrated initiatives interlinked with their commitment to agreements with Japan, China and Korea. The introduction of the Wildlife Conservation Plan for Migratory Shorebirds is a national framework focused on the research and development of migratory shorebirds within Australia. The EPBC Act 1999 has assisted the development of the Conservation Plan to facilitate the survival of bird species. The protection of habitats has been amplified by the National Landcare Programme as well as through coordinating measures with the Commonwealth Environmental Water Office, Parks Australia and the Great Barrier Reef Marine Park Authority.

== Reasons for migratory bird protection ==
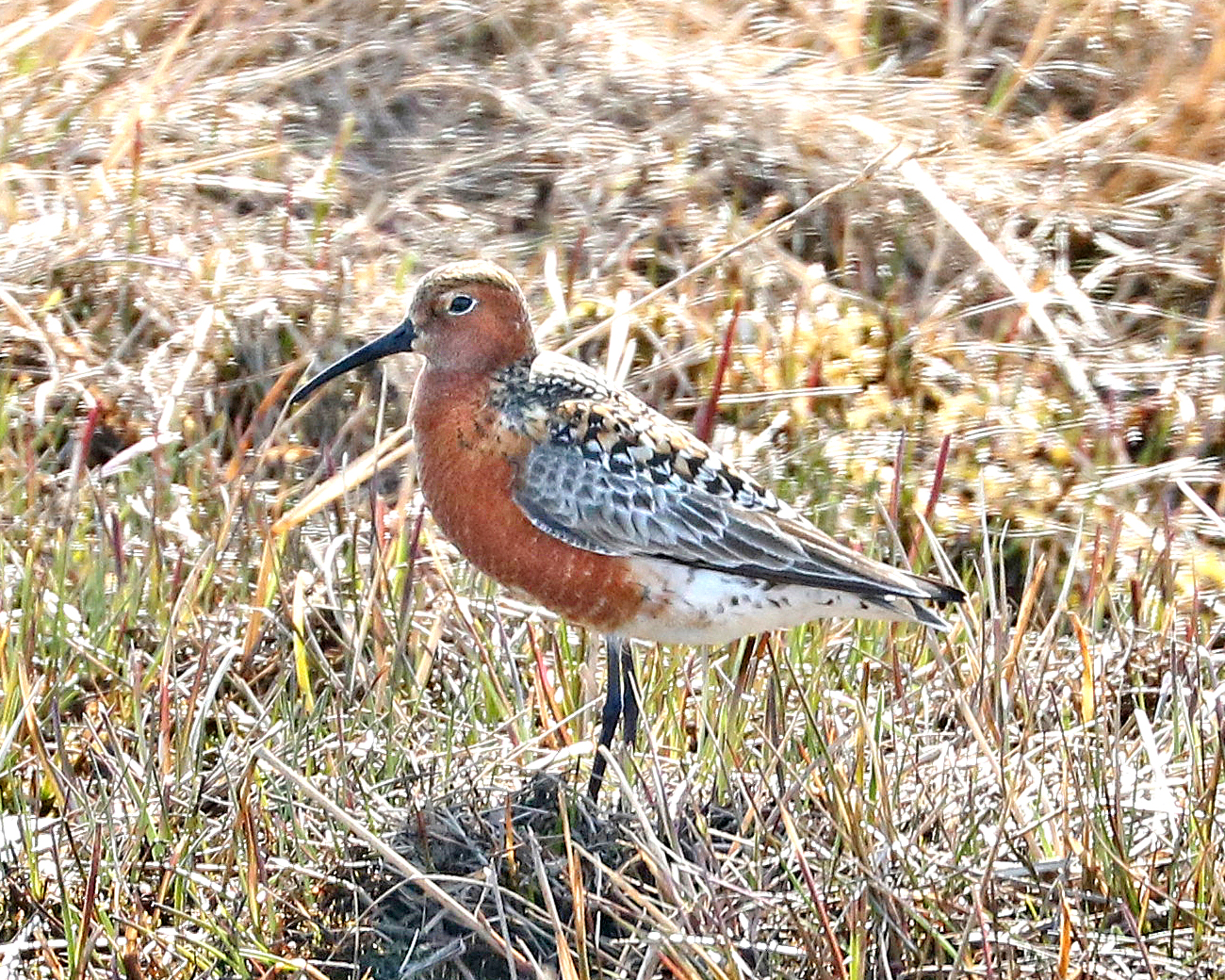
A Curlew Sanpiper pictured in Alaska

Evaluation of shorebird populations trends in eastern Australia has shown to have plummeted by 79% across 24 years. As Australia provides a habitat for millions of migratory birds yearly, there is a constant need for protection to prevent extinction and sustain ecosystems.

The decline in inland wetlands within Australia is another threat to migratory birds and a key reason for such agreements. Inland wetlands provide nutrients to surrounding water bodies and resultantly improve birdlife due to the nutrient-abundant habitats. Due to climate change and water-resource use, inland wetlands have declined and posed a risk to bird species that heavily rely on those habitats. Migratory bird agreements are created to ensure appropriate steps are taken to ensure the protection of bird environments, such as the role of the CAMBA in terminating contracting parties for bringing plants and animals that may be "hazardous to the preservation of migratory birds and their environment".

"For a species to have long-term population viability it needs to have the needs of all parts of its life history met. Species like Red Knots and Dunlin that concentrate in large numbers in a single area are especially vulnerable. Loss of a stopover area could mean the destruction of a whole flyway population of shorebirds. For example, the 30,000 Red Knots feeding on horseshoe crab eggs in Mispillion Harbor, Delaware Bay are highly vulnerable to human alteration of this resource, or even a catastrophic storm. The better knowledge we have on shorebird migratory patterns and needs, the more focused conservation efforts can be."

— Interview response by Sarah Lehnon, published by Mongabay News

Climate change is a major threat posed towards bird species given their sensitivity towards slight weather changes. Changes in climates and global warming not only influence the timing in migration, but also plant diversity in key habitual areas for birds due to processes like eutrophication which result in higher levels of nitrogen present in water. The increase in agricultural efforts has worsened ecosystems due to environmentally unfriendly and unfeasible processes such as the use of chemicals, as well as eutrophication. Rising sea levels is a threat to species that live around coastal lines and increases in forest fires is reducing bird populations due to the effects of climate change. Although there are moderate levels of responses to this specific issue, the increase in awareness and danger of climate change has meant there will be a greater need for more effective responses.

Migratory bird agreements play an important role in protecting and conserving migratory birds and their habitats by outlining both the birds that are protected and the clauses that determine what action contracting parties should be undertaking. Most migratory bird agreements highlight the birds that are protected such as that of the Annex in the CAMBA to ensure specificity and to monitor which birds are being protected over time as treaties like the CAMBA may be amended. For instance, in May 2015, the Eastern Curlew and Curlew Sandpiper were both listed as critically endangered, both of which are listed in the Annex. However, two-thirds of Australia's migratory birds remain unprotected under national protection, reflecting the need for further protection on this issue alongside the CAMBA.

== Issues ==
Several issues influence the need for migratory bird protection such as the CAMBA. The top threats include agriculture, aquaculture, biological resource use and natural system modifications. There is a range of other threats such as shooting, poisoning and electrocution which have all been identified for several years but the impact of these have worsened over time. Another frequent issue is derived from land-use constraints as a result of an increase in population and economic development. Land threat types include over-grazing, afforestation and burning or fire. Some issues go beyond the conventional dilemmas identified and are legally related, such as the pitfalls in international agreements. These include gaps in the listing of international migrants, national migrants and other legal mechanisms that aim to conserve migratory birds.

The increase in regulation on rivers and other water bodies is an issue with current migratory bird agreements. The CAMBA recognises laws and regulation as an exception from prohibiting the taking of birds and eggs while encouraging both parties to take measures to protect the environments of these birds. Although, many international agreements fail to recognise river regulation. The Murray-Darling Basin for example is largely regulated and experienced some of the largest declines in shorebird populations. Given the size of the Murray-Darling Basin water system, its impact on bird populations has proven to negatively influence ecosystems due to the increase in extraction, regulation and other harmful actions.

The complexity of multilateral treaties is another issue that worsens the effectiveness of protection measures. There is sophistication surrounding decision-making and implementation given the nature of multinational agreements as individual nations have different attitudes towards treaties. Legislation protecting specific areas are limited due to political jurisdictions but contrasts with the nature of migratory species being highly cross-jurisdictional. This national complexity given legal and political barriers makes migratory bird protection harder to implement and measure effectiveness. There has proven to be a greater need for harmonisation between state and federal responses by leveraging the EPBC Act 1999 through integrating it within the legislation to improve coordination. The complexity of treaties is evident through the implicit language used when defining key terms and often requires other legislation to provide more substantive details to support state governments in upholding protective measures. Response mechanisms such as the Ramsar Convention are seen as limited in their purpose of responding to migratory bird protection compared to migratory bird agreements such as the CAMBA, given the lack of detail and explicitness within the agreements. For instance, the Ramsar Convention focuses on the registration of wetland sites while migratory bird treaties have a greater focus on migratory birds in general.

A limitation of migratory bird migration within Australia, as demonstrated by the CAMBA and other bilateral treaties, is that the national government can implement international agreements, with states tending to employ their own regulations and laws. As a major piece of legislation at the national level, the EPBC Act 1999 lists all species under Australia's migratory agreements which have allowed for further management plans to be enacted. Examples include the Threat Abatement Plan for the incidental catch of seabirds during oceanic longline fishing operations and the Wildlife Conservation Plan for Migratory Shorebirds. The lack of current international agreements with countries where bird migration is prominent, such as with Indonesia or Papua New Guinea, has meant that those bird species remain largely unprotected. Despite international agreements, some countries that are involved in bird migration such as shorebirds that follow the Asian-Australasian Flyway, are not parties to an international instrument that aims to protect these species. Although, this does not occur for all international agreements, with the CAMBA shown to be effective by offering site managers in China training as part of the treaty. The involvement of the public in improving the protection of migratory birds is often limited too given the heavy reliance of the government on bilateral agreements. As governments tend to work with other stakeholders to integrate supportive measures, the government themselves do not tend to instigate any actions surrounding conversation.

== See also ==
- Japan–Australia Migratory Bird Agreement
- Republic of Korea–Australia Migratory Bird Agreement.
