= Lee Point =

- Suburb
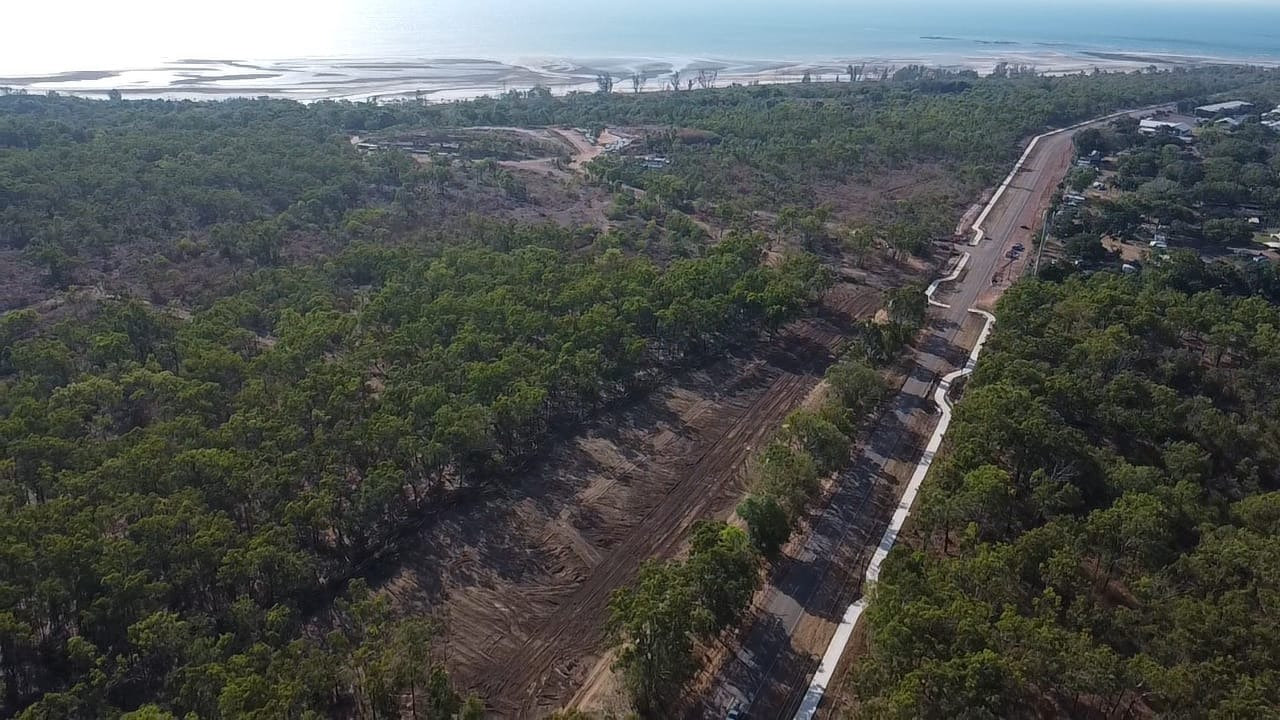
- Lee Point, Darwin

- Interactive map of Lee Point
- Coordinates: 12°20′22″S 130°53′35″E
- Country: Australia
- State: Northern Territory
- City: Darwin
- LGA: City of Darwin
- Location: 18 km (11 mi) from Darwin City
- Established: 1869

Government
  - Territory electorate: Casuarina
  - Federal division: Solomon

Area
  - Total: 31.0 km^{2} (12.0 sq mi)

Population
  - Total: 94 (2016 census)
  - Density: 3.032/km^{2} (7.85/sq mi)
- Postcode: 0810

Lee Point refers to a coastal point north of the city of Darwin, Northern Territory, Australia.

== History ==
It is on the traditional Country and waterways of the Larrakia people. The area is known to the Larrakia people as Binybara, and has been described as 'sacred... a living and breathing archive".

The name is derived from the point, "Lee Point" which appears on George Goyder's 1869 Plan of Port Darwin which likely dates back to Stokes' examination of the harbour in 1839.

It is also forms the northern point of the Casuarina Coastal Reserve, featuring a recreational area and nearby hotel and caravan park.

There are a number of World War II heritage sites in the area. Along the cycle path which runs from Lee Point to Brinkin is a preserved bunker built between 1939 and 1941 as part of Australia's coastal defence strategy.

== Biodiversity ==
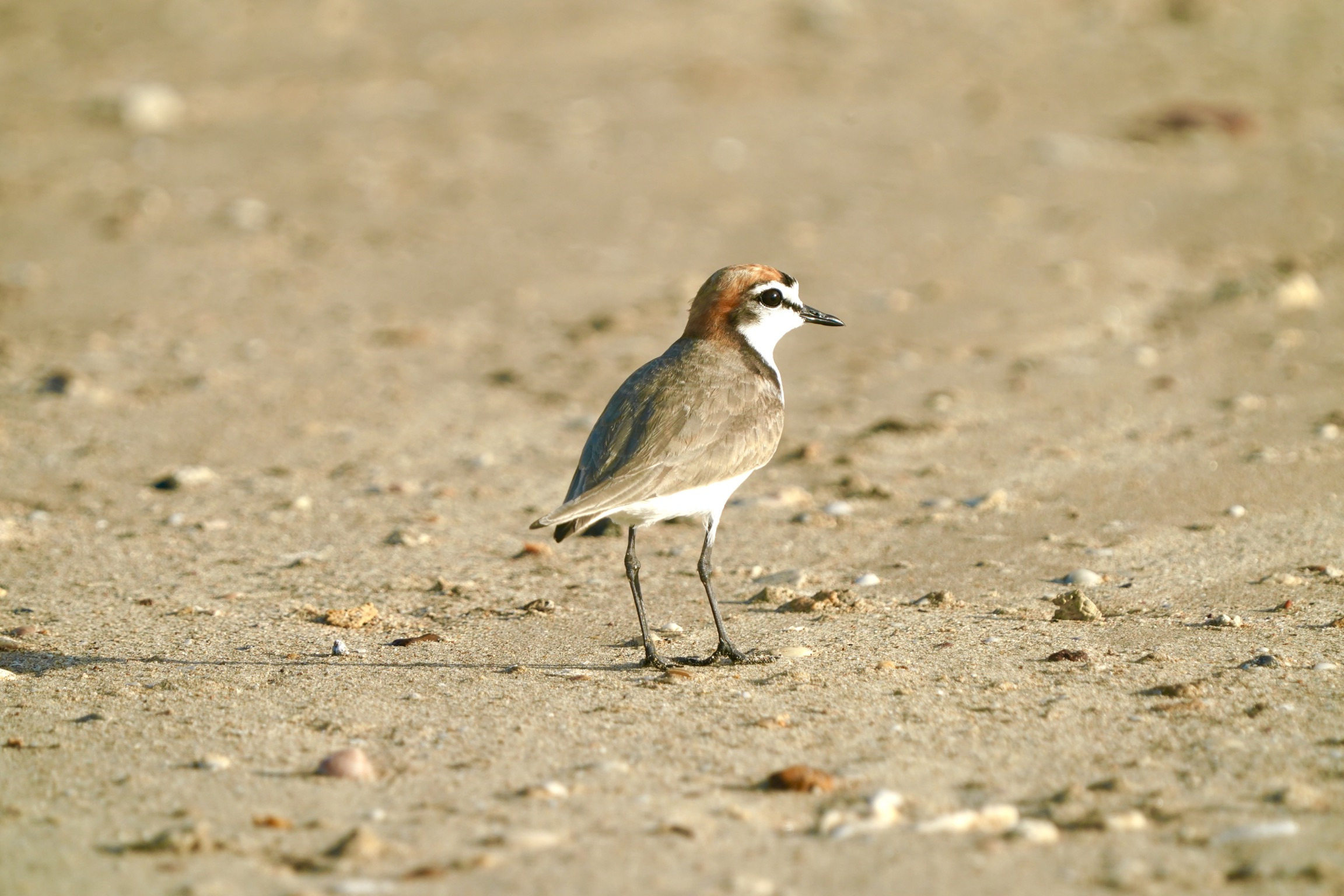
Red-capped plover, native species, Lee Point. Least concern.

Lee Point forms part of a largely undeveloped 27 kilometre coastal monsoon forrest corridor that runs from Casuarina Coastal Reserve to Shoal Bay Coastal Reserve, and includes Buffalo Creek and Sandy Creek. It features sandy beaches, tidal flats, estuaries, dune systems, mangrove communities, Casuarina forests, old growth trees, monsoon forests and an offshore marine area. It is the last remaining biodiversity corridor that connects the Darwin savanna woodland to the broader ecosystem across northern Australia. Studies have found this tropical savanna ecosystem is highly vulnerable to climate change and meets the criteria of collapsing. Lee Point and Buffalo Creek form part of the internationally significant Shoal Bay Key Biodiversity Area, which was declared based on records of the Critically Endangered Great Knot (Calidris tenuirostris). Lee Point and Sandy Creek beaches are connected ecosystems and used by migratory shorebirds in the network of sites so birds can move between low tide and high tide.

An internationally-significant site for migratory shorebirds, the reserve supports up to 10,000 shorebirds from over 25 species including the critically-endangered Far Eastern Curlew as well as the whimbrel, bar-tailed godwit, black-tailed godwit, great knot, red knot, greater sand plover, lesser sand plover, sanderling, red-necked stint and ruddy turnstone.

Many species of rare vagrant birds have been recorded at Lee Point and Buffalo Creek beaches, including Black-backed Gull, Black-tailed Gull, Kentish Plover, Christmas Island Frigatebird and others. Several species of migratory shorebird have suffered chronic levels of anthropogenic disturbances along Lee Point beach, and these disturbances cause the shorebirds to fly away from humans and humans and dogs, which causes unnecessary use of energy resources.

Many waterbird species have also been recorded at Lee Point beach, including 200 Radjah Shelduck in 2014, as well as Pied Cormorant, Pied Heron, Little Egret, Little Tern. The migratory tern species Common Gull-billed Tern as well as the resident-breeding Australian Tern have also been recorded at Lee Point beach.

Lee Point is also a significant habitat site for the endangered Gouldian finch.

It is also home to the endangered black-footed tree rat and northern brown bandicoot. Flatback turtles nest along Sandy Creek beach and Lee Point beach. There are regular sightings of saltwater crocodiles in Buffalo Creek.

== Development ==
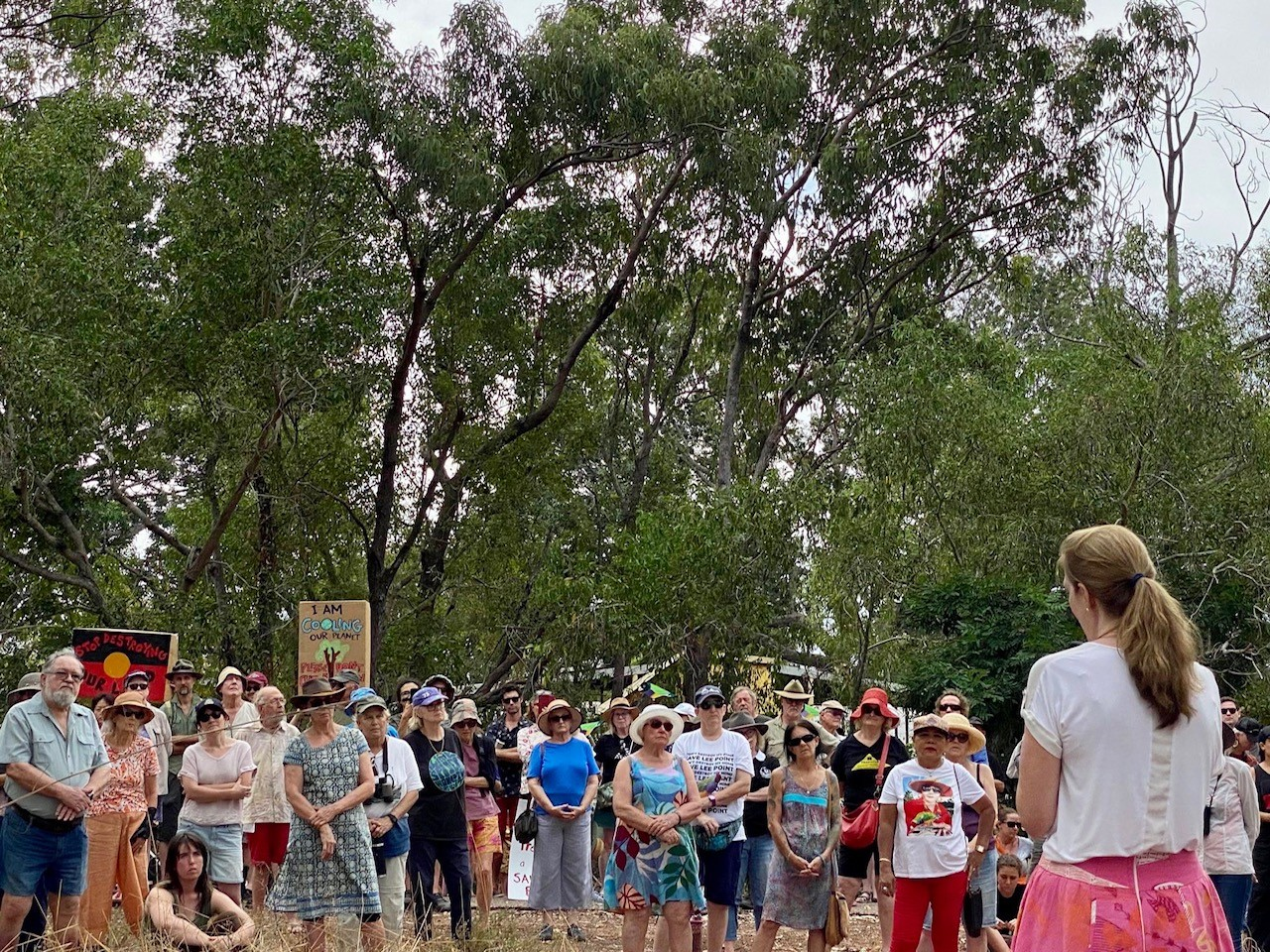
Community members protest Defence Housing project at Lee Point/Binybara, Darwin.

The area has been long defended by environmental and Indigenous communities.

Lee Point is the location for a controversial multi-million-dollar Defence Housing Australia housing project, approved in 2019. It includes 800 houses built across 131 hectares of zoned residential land. The development has caused community concern about the project's environmental and cultural impacts. In 2016, it was deemed that the proposed urban development would have the potential to impact migratory shorebirds through increased human access to the important roosting and feeding site Sandy Creek, on the northern beaches of Darwin.

Federal approval of the project was halted in 2022 upon increased sightings of the rebounding Gouldian Finch population. The land clearing is particularly considered a threat to finch population as they lay their eggs in tree hollows. Original approval conditions were changed to include a four hectare wildlife corridor around their habitat area. Campaigning to prevent clearing continued, and upon commencement of land clearing there were community protests which saw 11 arrests. While Larrakia Nation Aboriginal Corporation initially supported the project, they withdrew support. Danggalaba Kulumbirigin traditional owners made an emergency application to Federal Environment Minister Tanya Plibersek to have it ceased, on the grounds of protecting Aboriginal cultural heritage. It was rejected in March 2024, sparking additional protests. Defence Housing Australia voluntarily stopped work on the project until March 31 2024. They then recommenced land clearing in late April 2024 triggering additional protests to defend the site resulting in multiple arrests. Works halted again shortly after with accusations of illegal land clearing.
