= Muttonwood =

Muttonwood is a common name for several plants and may refer to:

- Myrsine species, including:
  - Myrsine variabilis, variable muttonwood, native to Australia
  - Myrsine howittiana, brush muttonwood, native to Australia
- Turpinia occidentalis, native to Central America
