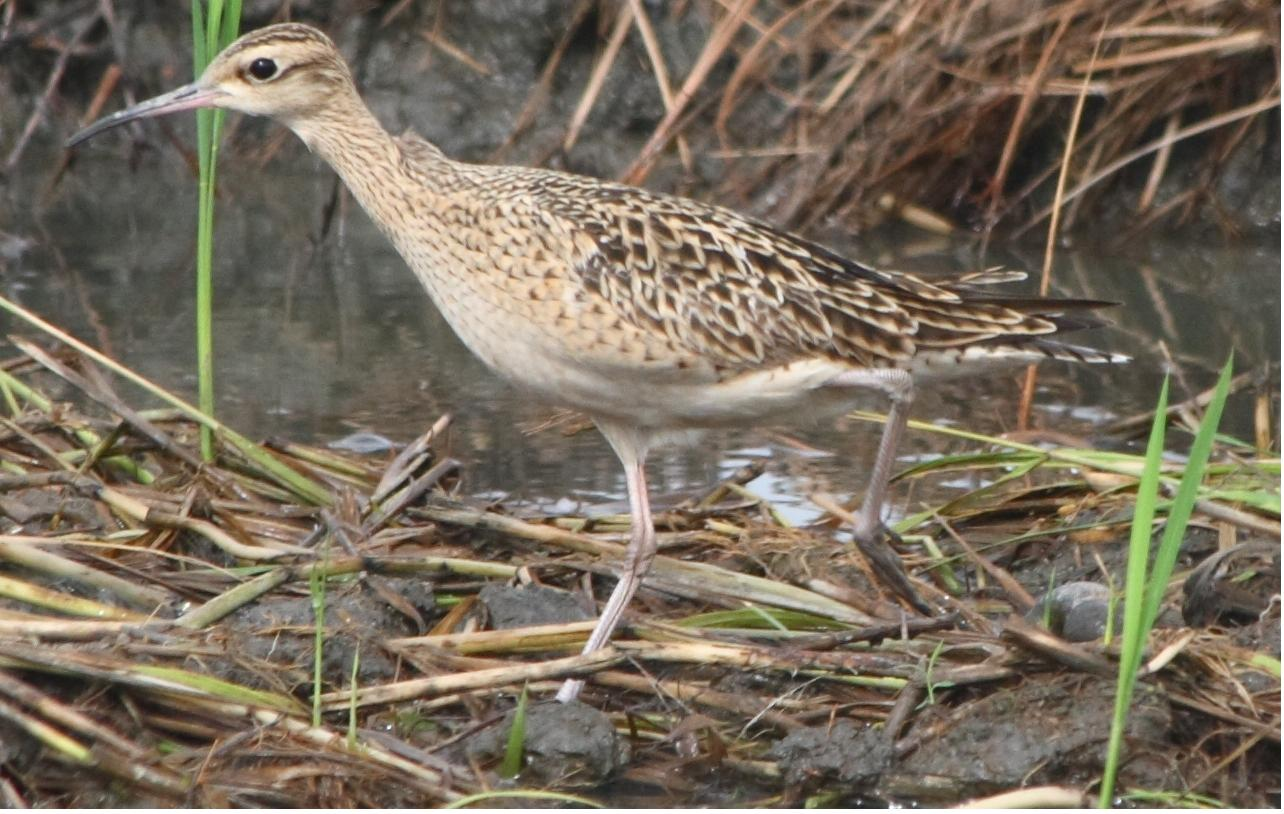

Conservation status
- Least Concern (IUCN 3.1)

Scientific classification
- Kingdom: Animalia
- Phylum: Chordata
- Class: Aves
- Order: Charadriiformes
- Family: Scolopacidae
- Genus: Numenius
- Species: N. minutus

Binomial name
- Numenius minutus Gould, 1841

= Little curlew =

Species of bird

The little curlew (Numenius minutus) is a wader in the large bird family Scolopacidae. It is a very small curlew, which breeds in the far north of Siberia. It is closely related to the North American Eskimo curlew.

== Etymology ==
The word "curlew" is imitative of the Eurasian curlew's call, but may have been influenced by the Old French corliu, "messenger", from courir, "to run". It was first recorded in 1377 in Langland's Piers Plowman. The genus name Numenius is from Ancient Greek noumenios, a bird mentioned by Hesychius. It is associated with the curlews because it appears to be derived from neos, "new", and mene, "moon", referring to the crescent-shaped bill. The species name is from Latin minutus, "small".

== Description ==
It is mainly greyish-brown, including the underwings, with a white belly, and a short, for a curlew, curved bill. It has a head pattern like a Eurasian whimbrel, with crown and superciliary stripes. The call is a repetitive whistle. It is the smallest species of curlew with an average length of 28–31 cm (11–12 in), an average wingspan of 68–71 cm (27–28 in) and an average weight of 175 grams (6.2 oz).

== Behaviour ==
This is a strongly migratory species, wintering in Australasia. It is a very rare vagrant to western Europe, including once in Blankenberge, Belgium, in September 2010. In the winter of 2019/2020 a bird was seen in The Netherlands.

=== Breeding ===
This bird breeds in loose colonies in forest clearings in river valleys. The nest is a ground scrape. It winters inland on grassland, cultivation or near fresh water, mainly in northern Australia but also as far south as St Kilda, South Australia. It is gregarious, forming sizeable flocks. This species feeds by probing soft mud for small invertebrates.

SE Queensland, Australia
