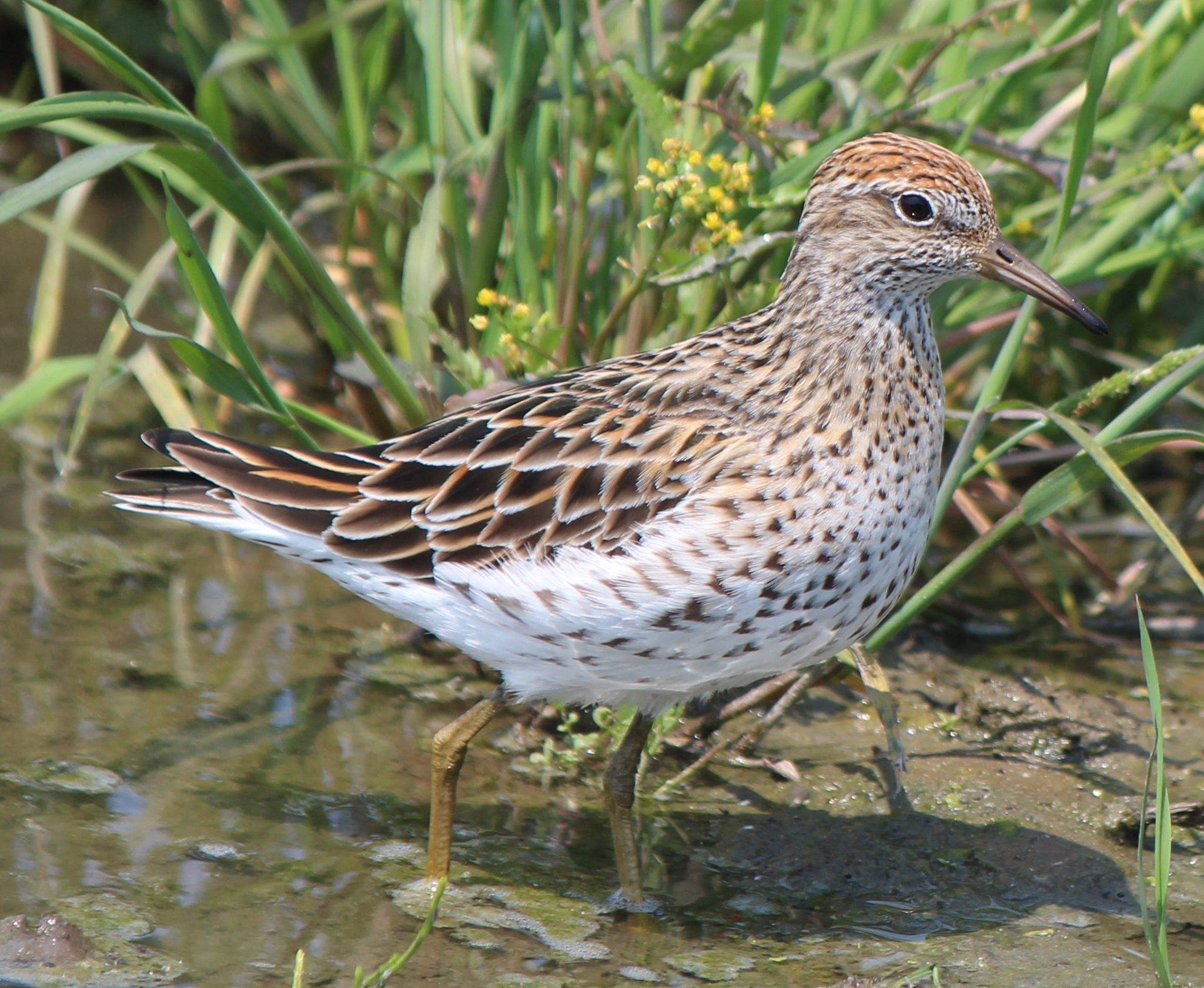
- Breeding plumage, on spring passage, Japan
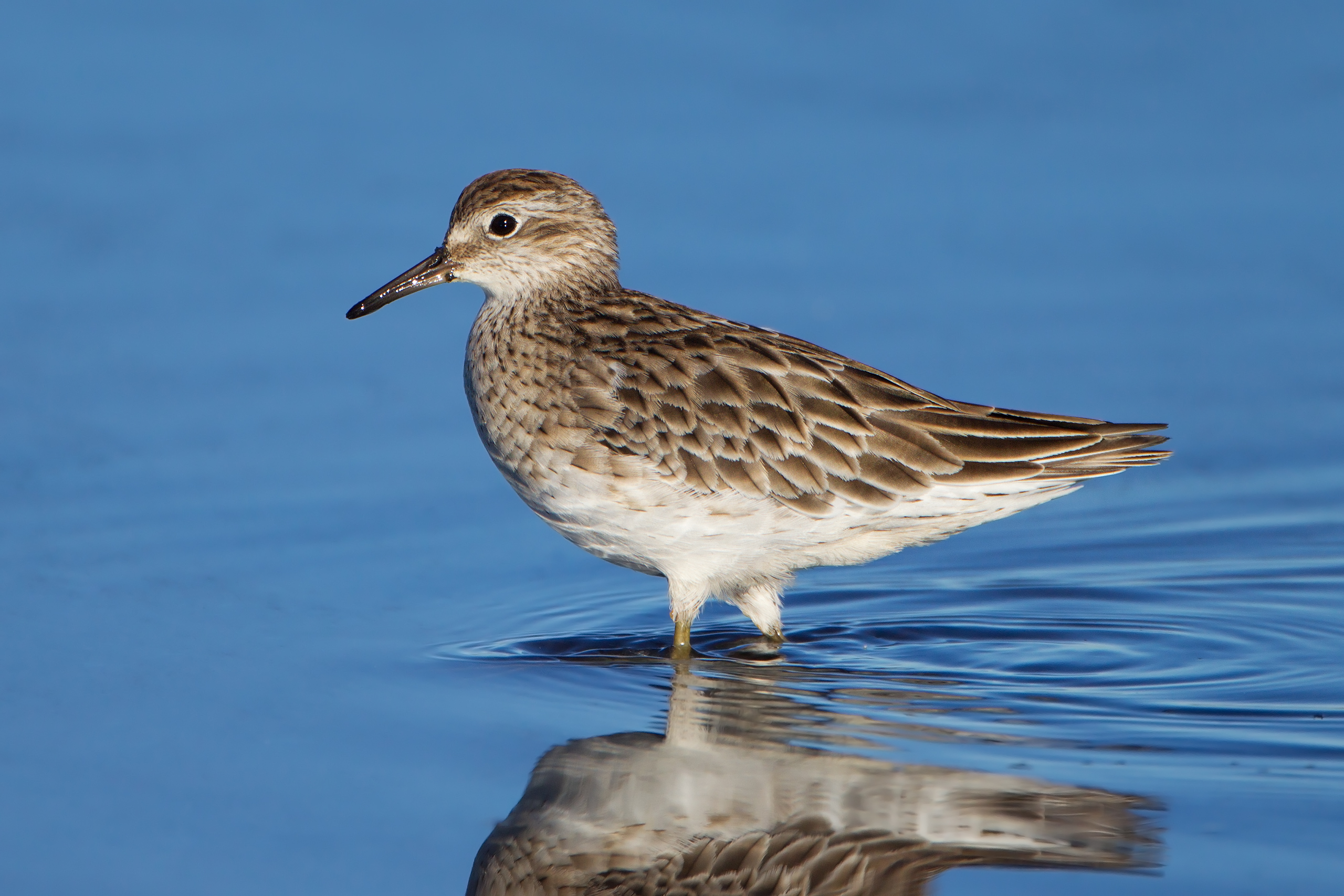
- Winter plumage, Australia

Conservation status
- Vulnerable (IUCN 3.1)

Scientific classification
- Kingdom: Animalia
- Phylum: Chordata
- Class: Aves
- Order: Charadriiformes
- Family: Scolopacidae
- Genus: Calidris
- Species: C. acuminata

Binomial name
- Calidris acuminata (Horsfield, 1821)

= Sharp-tailed sandpiper =

Species of shorebird

The sharp-tailed sandpiper (Calidris acuminata) is a small-medium migratory wader or shorebird, found mostly in Siberia during the summer breeding period (June to August) and Australia for wintering (September to March).

== Taxonomy ==
Within the genus Calidris the sharp-tailed sandpiper is most closely related to the broad-billed sandpiper (Calidris falcinellus).

The genus name calidris comes from the Ancient Greek kalidris or skalidris, a term used by Aristotle for some grey-coloured waterside birds. The specific acuminata is from Latin acuminatus, 'sharp, pointed'.

== Description ==
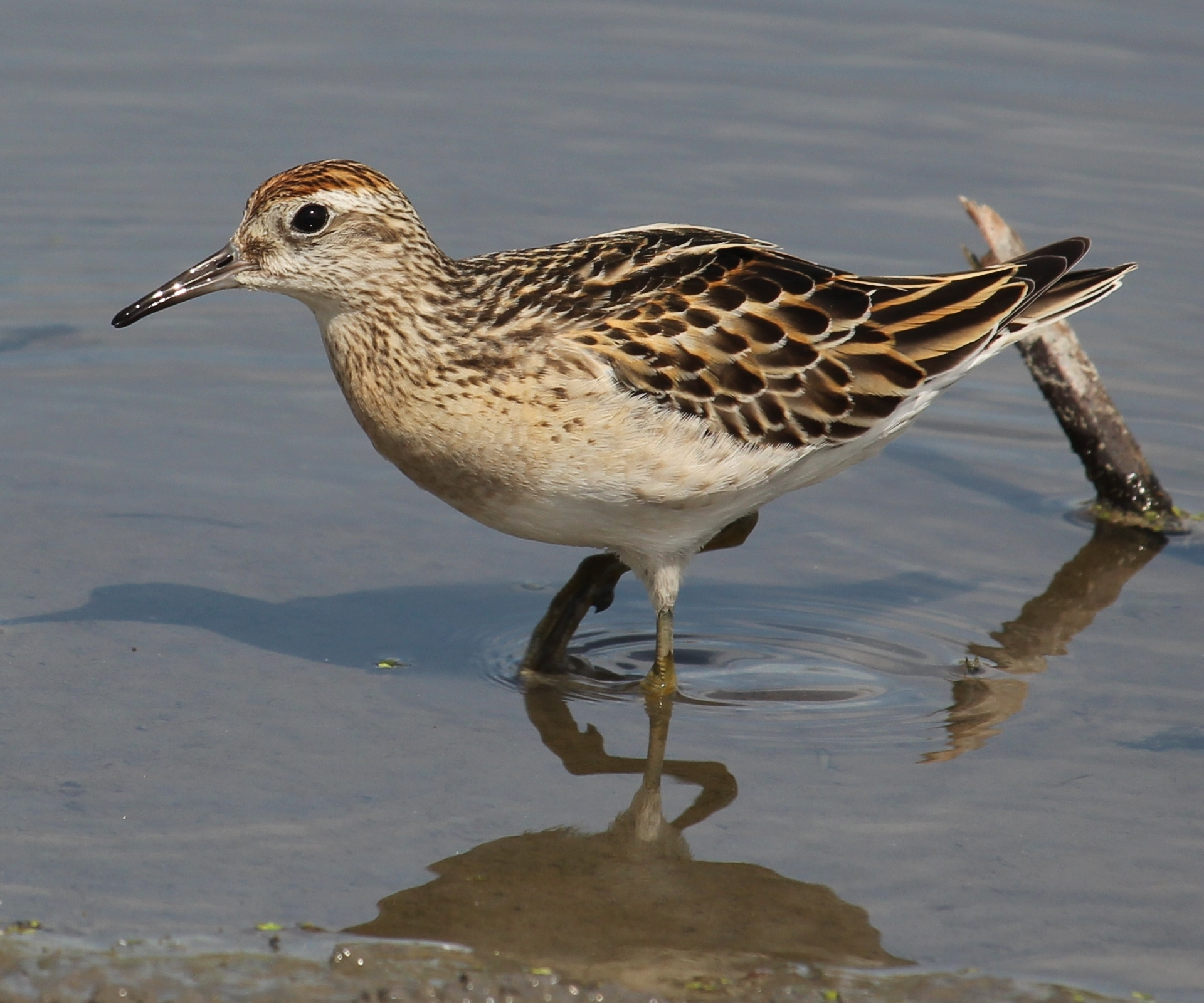
Juvenile plumage in autumn, Japan

A small-medium wader, the portly sandpiper has a pot belly, flat back and somewhat drawn-out rear end. It has a mottled chestnut-brown upper body with sharp-looking feathers with a dark centre, a chestnut cap on its head and a brown stripe through each eye. Its bill is dark grey to black and straight, and its legs are olive- to yellow-coloured. The underparts are white or paler in colour, with the mottling similar to that on the breast and sides of the belly. The plumage is more vivid during the breeding season and duller in its winter plumage. The juveniles are brighter in colour in autumn and early winter than adults, with sharper feathers and brighter chestnut-coloured crowns contrasting with the white mantle stripes and bright, buffy chests.

The most similar-looking species is the pectoral sandpiper, within whose Asian range the sharp-tailed sandpiper breeds. It differs from that species in its breast pattern, lacking the strongly demarcated breast band, and instead having '>'-shaped marks on the flanks; a stronger supercilium, and more chestnut-coloured crown. It has some similarities to the long-toed stint, but is much larger.

=== Measurements ===
- Size: 22 cm
- Weight: 39–114 g
- Wingspan: 36–43 cm

== Distribution and occurrence ==
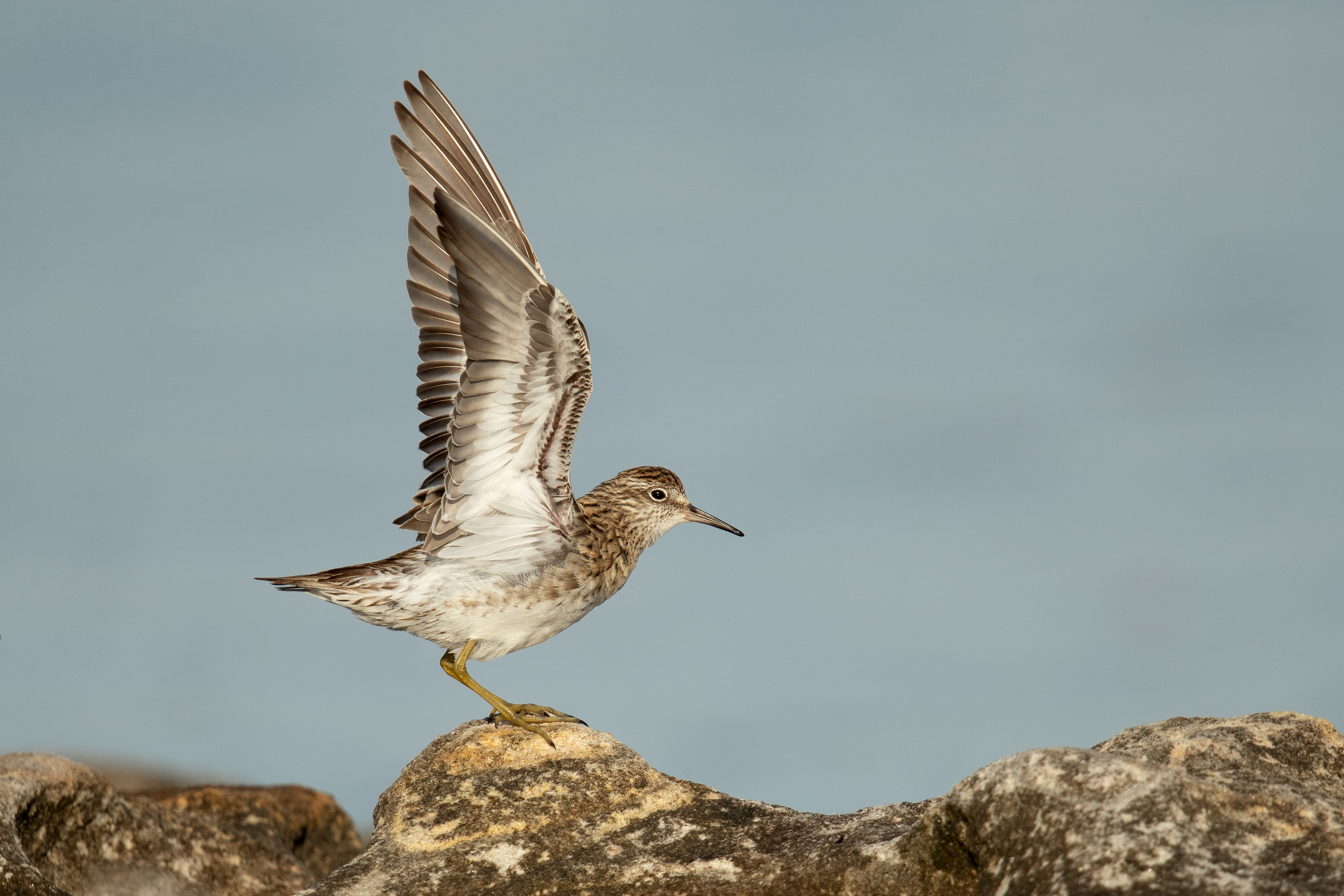
Winter plumage; with wings stretched

Sharp-tailed sandpipers are strongly migratory, breeding solely in eastern Siberia from the Taymyr Peninsula to Chaunskaya Bay in Chukotka. They have a complex migration, with adults departing Siberia in July and juveniles in August to head south, with the majority of the population wintering in Australasia. They take two main routes, with the majority of post-breeding adults flying south in flocks of less than 1000, east of Lake Baikal, to the Pacific coast of Russia and the Yellow Sea coasts of China, Korea and Japan. They mostly all fly directly to Micronesia and New Guinea in late August, departing here with the onset of the wet season to northwest Australia in mid-September. They start moving towards southeast Australia with numbers peaking in December to February. The other route heads east, taking most juveniles and a few adults into Alaska across the Bering Strait. Staying here from mid-August to late October to fatten up, it is presumed they then take a direct non-stop trans-Pacific flight of more than 10,000 km to reach Australia and New Zealand. Some will continue south along the Pacific coast of North America into Washington, less frequently to California, and possibly into Latin America, but only two recent records occur in Panama and Bolivia.

It occurs as a rare autumn migrant to North America, but in western Europe only as a very rare migrant with records in 11 different countries, mostly in the United Kingdom, between August and October. It has been recorded in the Middle East and Central Asia, six times in Kazakhstan, once in Yemen and Oman. Within the Indian Ocean they have been documented at Christmas Island four times, totalling 16 birds between October and December. There have been three recorded observations at Cocos Island in November and December; five records at the Chagos archipelago from September to December; and five records in Seychelles, one in July, two in September to February overwintering, and two on passage in November. They have been recently documented in Mozambique, recorded in southern Africa for the first time in 2018.

== Habitat ==
In Siberia, the breeding ground is mostly tundra made up of peat-hummock and lichen. On passage between breeding and wintering areas they favor the muddy edges of shallow freshwater or brackish wetlands with grass, emergent or inundated sedges, saltmarsh or other low vegetation. These include swamps, lakes, lagoons, and pools near coasts, waterholes, dams, saltpans and hypersaline salt lakes inland. In Alaska they seem to prefer coastal moist graminoid meadows and riverine intertidally exposed mudbanks. In Australia they are largely found around wetlands, preferring freshwater inland wetlands with grassy edges. Once the ephemeral terrestrial wetlands have dried out, they tend to be seen on coastal mudflats, salt marsh and brackish lagoons and less often on similar wet fields of short grass. Other areas they have been spotted in Australia include around sewage farms, flooded fields, mangroves, rocky shores and beaches.

== Behaviour ==
Little is known about the specific behaviour of the sharp-tailed sandpiper, but generally its behaviour and structure are most similar to the pectoral sandpiper.

=== Breeding ===
Sharp-tailed sandpipers breed from to June to August in the short Siberian summer, making shallow, hollow, lined nests made of leaves and grass. The nests are hidden on the ground and hard to distinguish from surrounding the surrounding landscape. The clutch size is usually four eggs, with the females incubating and raising the chicks. The breeding plumage is more vivid, with breast feathers greater in chestnut colour and their chevron-shaped markings becoming more defined.

=== Foraging and feeding ===
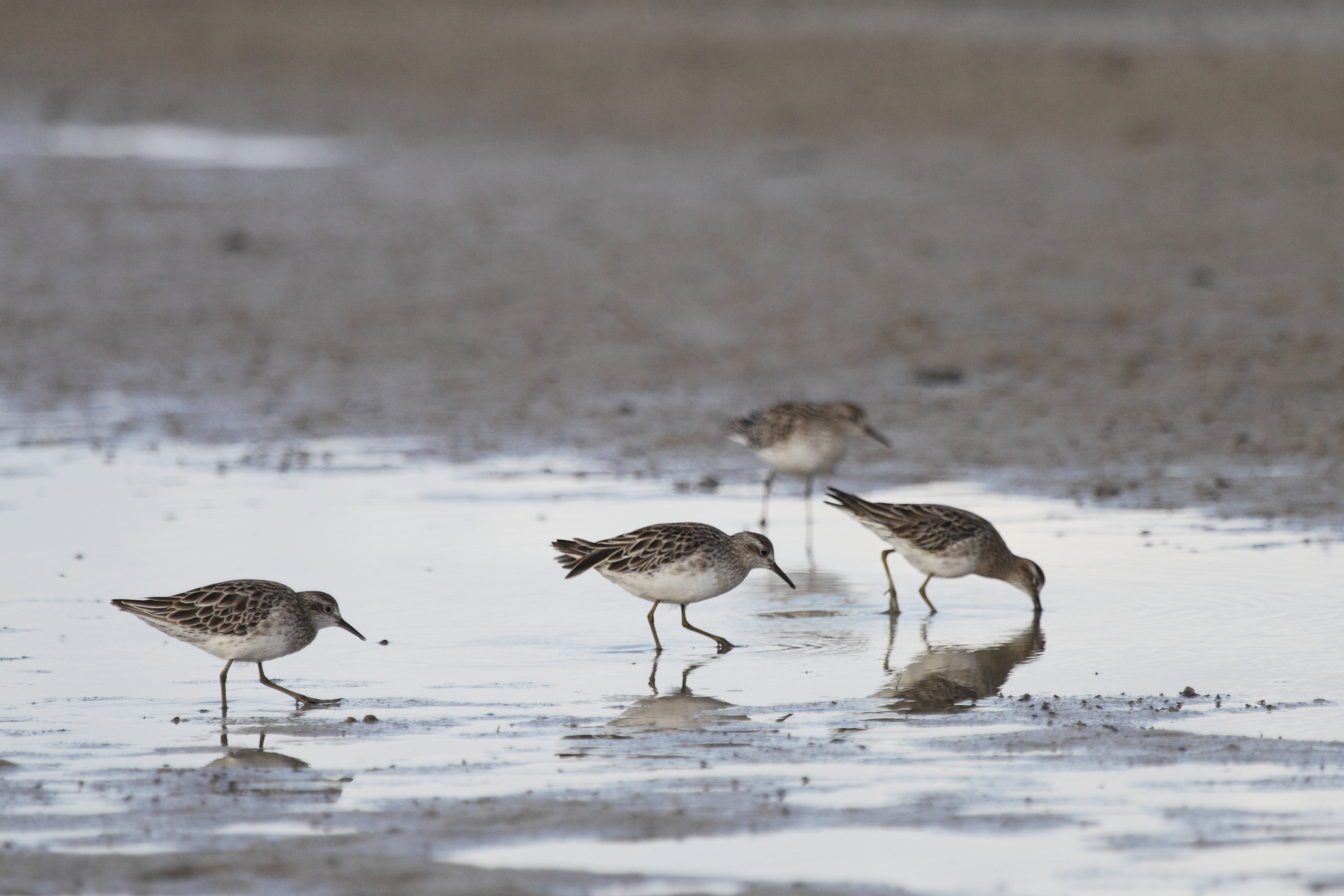
A flock of sharp-tailed sandpipers foraging

Sharp-tailed sandpipers forage on the edge of wetlands, intertidal mudflats, either on sand or bare wet mud and in shallow water. They will also forage among inundated vegetation of grass, sedges or saltmarsh. After rain they can be found in paddocks of short grass, well away from water. At low tides they can be found on the intertidal mudflats, before moving inland to freshwater wetlands at the high tide. Occasionally they forage on dry or wet mats of algae, among rotting seaweed or seagrass on beaches, edges of stony wetlands and exposed reefs. Picking up food by sight or sometimes by probing, they mainly eat aquatic insects, molluscs, crustaceans, worms, occasionally seeds and other invertebrates.

== Conservation ==
The species is currently listed as vulnerable globally by the IUCN in 2021, with an estimated number of 60,000 to 120,000 mature individuals and a decreasing population trend. The major threats to the species are habitat loss, with the staging areas used in migration being reduced through reclamation of land for aquaculture or degraded from human activities. In Australia this occurs through clearing, inundation, draining or infilling of wetlands, and reduces the availability of foraging and roosting sites. This affects their ability to build up the energy to complete the return trip back to the breeding grounds in Siberia. Habitat degradation also occurs in the form of the loss of riparian vegetation, invasive species, water pollution, and hydrological regime changes from human-induced regulation. Sharp-tailed sandpipers are also subject to disturbance from humans, namely in encroaching residential and recreational activities, disturbing their breeding and foraging habits. They also experience increased direct mortality from hunting, vehicle collisions, aircraft strikes and predation by pest fauna, foxes and cats.
