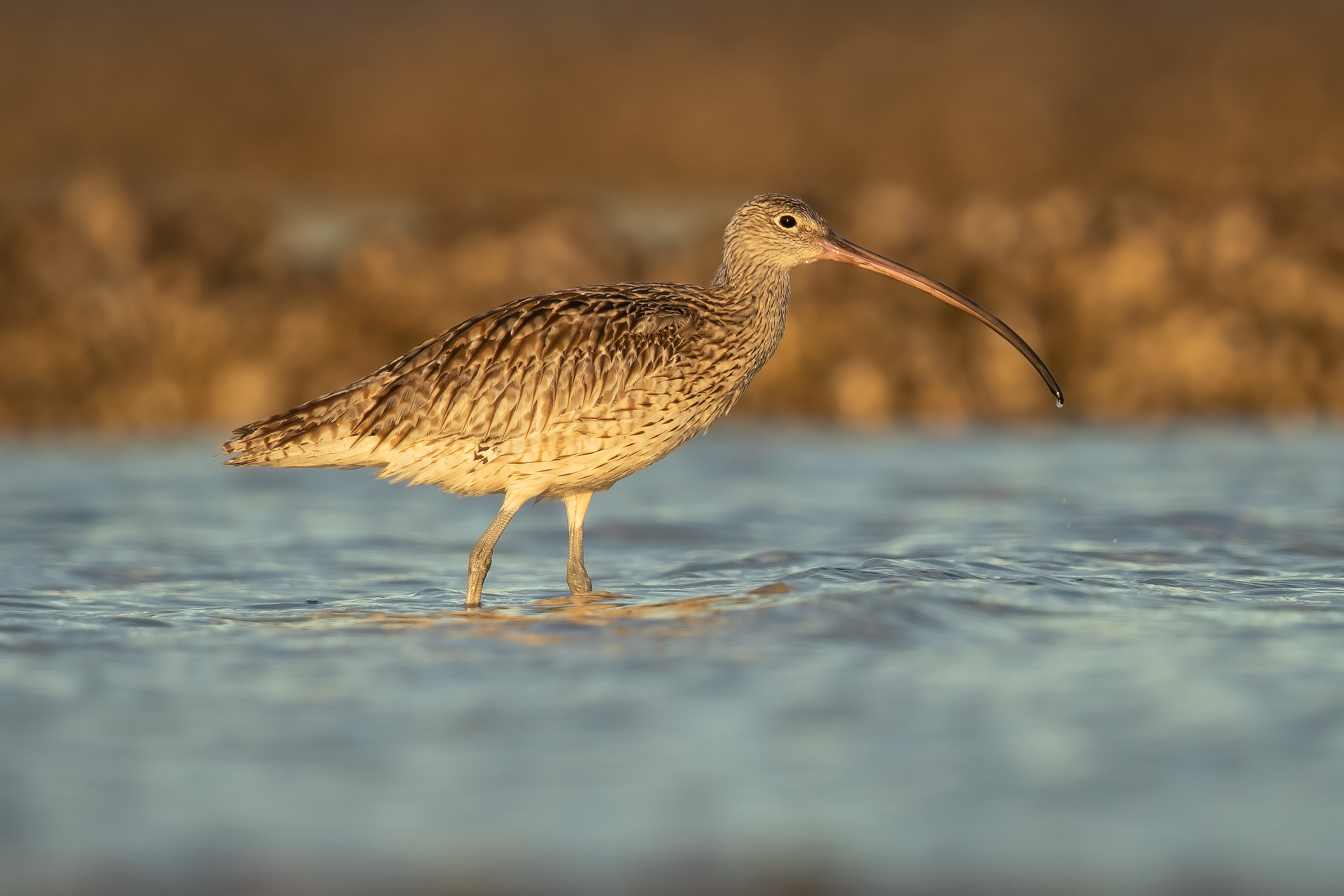

Conservation status
- Endangered (IUCN 3.1)

Scientific classification
- Kingdom: Animalia
- Phylum: Chordata
- Class: Aves
- Order: Charadriiformes
- Family: Scolopacidae
- Genus: Numenius
- Species: N. madagascariensis

Binomial name
- Numenius madagascariensis (Linnaeus, 1766)

Synonyms
- Scolopax madagascariensis Linnaeus, 1766; Numenius cyanopus Vieillot, 1817; Numenius australis Gould, 1838; Numenius rostratus Gray, 1843

= Far Eastern curlew =

Species of bird

The Far Eastern curlew (Numenius madagascariensis) is a large wader most similar in appearance to the long-billed curlew, but slightly larger. It is mostly brown, differentiated from other curlews by its plain, unpatterned brown underwing, and brown rump. It is not only the largest curlew but probably the world's largest sandpiper, at 60–66 cm (24–26 in) in length and 110 cm (43 in) across the wings. The weight is 390–1,350 g (0.86–2.98 lb), which is equalled by the Eurasian curlew; females are on average about 100 g heavier than males. The extremely long bill, at 12.8–20.1 cm (5.0–7.9 in) in length, rivals the bill size of the closely related long-billed curlew as the longest bill for a sandpiper. It overlaps in range with the eastern subspecies of the Eurasian curlew Numenius arquata orientalis, from which it is most easily told by its brown rump and lower back, rather than white.

== Taxonomy ==
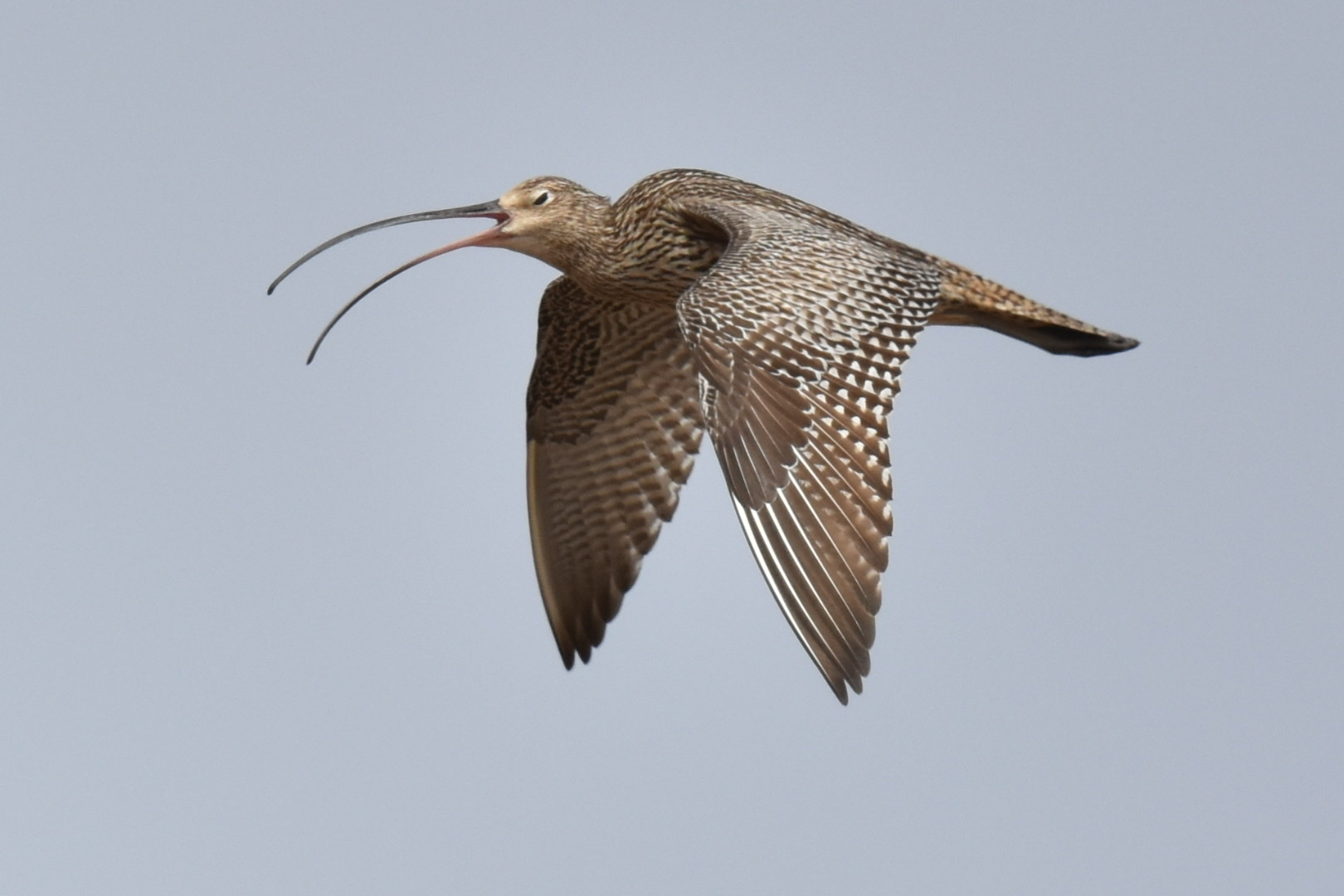
Far Eastern curlew in flight on its breeding grounds near Magadan in the far east of Russia. The brown rump is just visible.

In 1760 the French zoologist Mathurin Jacques Brisson included a description of the Far Eastern curlew in his Ornithologie based on a specimen. He used the French name Le courly de Madagascar and the Latin Numenius madagascariensis. Although Brisson coined Latin names, these do not conform to the binomial system and are not recognised by the International Commission on Zoological Nomenclature. When in 1766 the Swedish naturalist Carl Linnaeus updated his Systema Naturae for the twelfth edition, he added 240 species that had been previously described by Brisson. One of these was the Far Eastern curlew, for which he coined the binomial name Scolopax madagascariensis. The name madagascariensis, referring to Madagascar, was an error by Brisson, with the type locality now known to have been Makassar on Sulawesi, Indonesia, where it winters; the species has never been recorded in Madagascar.

== Distribution and habitat ==
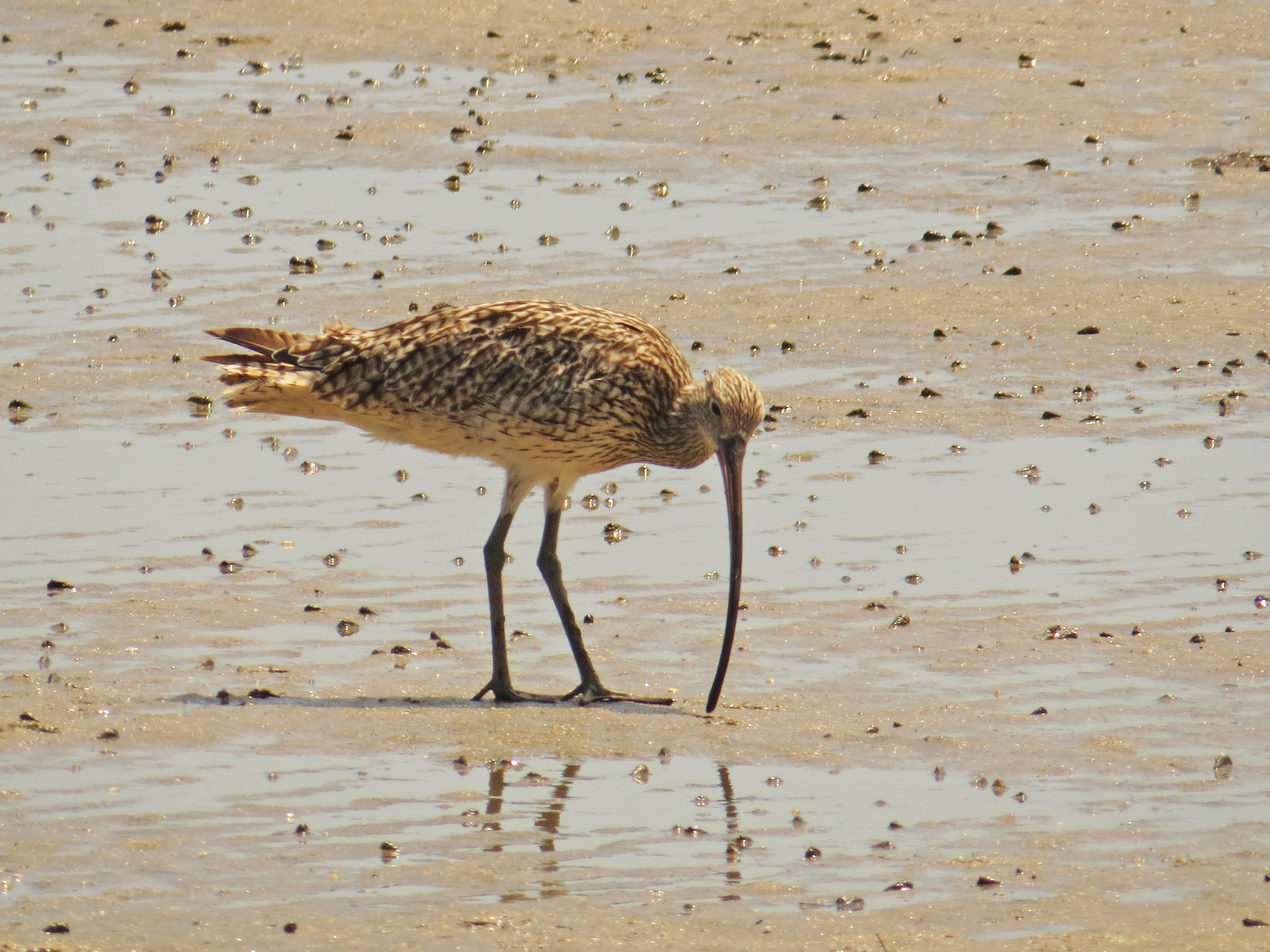
Cairns Esplanade, Queensland, Australia

The Far Eastern curlew spends its breeding season in northeastern Asia, including Siberia to Kamchatka, and Mongolia. Its breeding habitat is composed of marshy and swampy wetlands and lakeshores. Most individuals spend the non-breeding season in coastal Australia, with some wintering in Indonesia, Thailand, Philippines and New Zealand, where they stay at estuaries, beaches, and salt marshes; a few winter as far north as southern China and Taiwan. During its migration the Far Eastern curlew commonly makes stopovers on the mudflats of the Yellow Sea and some on the coasts of Japan.

It uses its long, decurved bill to probe for invertebrates in the mud. It may feed in solitary but it generally congregates in large flocks to migrate or roost. Its call is a sharp, clear whistle, cuuue-reee, often repeated.

=== Diet ===
On its breeding grounds the Far Eastern curlew consumes insects, such as larvae of beetles and flies, and amphipods. During migration it also feeds on berries. In the non-breeding season, it consumes marine invertebrates, preferring crabs and small molluscs but also taking other crustaceans and polychaetes.

== Conservation status ==
As of 2024, there are an estimated 20,000 – 35,000 mature individuals in the world. Formerly classified as least concern by the IUCN until 2009, it was found to have been rarer than previously believed and thus its status was uplisted to Vulnerable in 2010 and subsequently to Endangered in 2015, where it currently remains.

In Australia its status under the Environment Protection and Biodiversity Conservation Act is "critically endangered".

=== Threats ===
Its population decline has been linked to the massive tidal flat reclamations by China, North Korea and South Korea along the coasts of the Yellow Sea, which have caused a greater than 65% loss of mudflats where the Far Eastern curlew makes stopovers.
