= List of birds of Georgia =

List of birds of Georgia may refer to:

- List of birds of Georgia (country)
- List of birds of Georgia (U.S. state)
