= Melanocorypha donchevi =

Melanocorypha donchevi Temporal range: Piacenzian

Scientific classification
- Kingdom: Animalia
- Phylum: Chordata
- Class: Aves
- Order: Passeriformes
- Family: Alaudidae
- Genus: Melanocorypha
- Species: †M. donchevi

Binomial name
- †Melanocorypha donchevi Boev, 2012

Extinct species of bird

Melanocorypha donchevi is an extinct species of lark in the genus Melanocorypha that lived in Bulgaria during the Neogene period.
