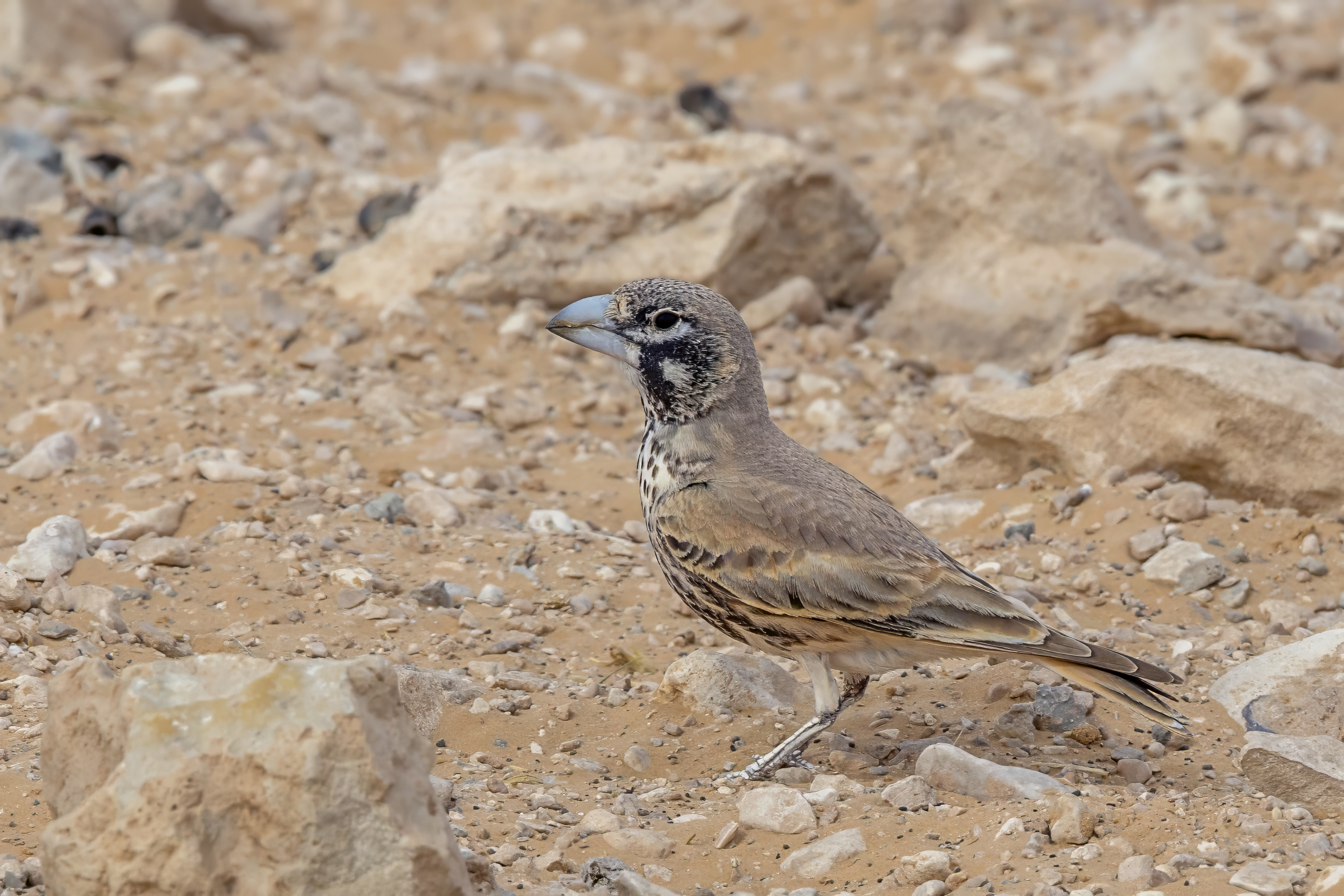
- Female, near Douz, Kébili, Tunisia

Conservation status
- Least Concern (IUCN 3.1)

Scientific classification
- Kingdom: Animalia
- Phylum: Chordata
- Class: Aves
- Order: Passeriformes
- Family: Alaudidae
- Genus: Ramphocoris; Bonaparte, 1850
- Species: R. clotbey

Binomial name
- Ramphocoris clotbey (Bonaparte, 1850)
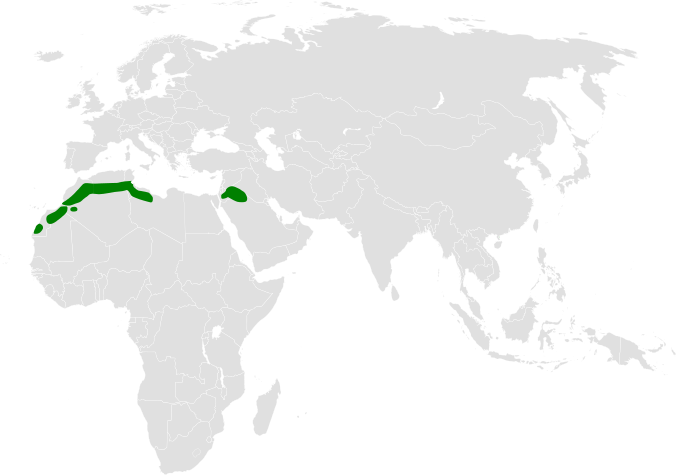

Synonyms
- Melanocorypha clotbey; Rhamphocorys clotbey

= Thick-billed lark =

Species of bird

The thick-billed lark (Ramphocoris clotbey) is a species of lark in the family Alaudidae native to north Africa and the far southwest of Asia, in the northern Sahara and Arabian Deserts.

== Taxonomy and systematics ==
It was named after Bey Antoine Clot. Charles Lucien Bonaparte originally described it in the genus Melanocorypha, but later the same year he described the new monotypic genus Ramphocoris for it, in which it is still placed. The species is monotypic, with no subspecies described.

Its closest relatives are the larks in the genus Ammomanes; these differ in plainer sandy-brown plumage and slender bills. Despite sharing stout bill structure, the larks in the genera Eremopterix and Melanocorypha are less closely related.

== Distribution and habitat ==
It is found in the northern Sahara Desert south of the Atlas Mountains, from Western Sahara and northern Mauritania through southern Morocco, central Algeria and southern Tunisia to Libya, also in central regions of the Arabian Peninsula north to Jordan, and more rarely in southern Syria. Its natural habitats are subtropical or tropical arid hot deserts.

== Description ==
It is a large, stoutly-built lark, 17–18 cm long, with males weighing 52–55 g and females 45 g. The bill is exceptionally stout (the thickest of any lark), pale blue-grey with a darker grey tip and a bulbous curved culmen. The wing has a white trailing edge, conspicuous in flight, reminiscent of white-winged lark though with less extensive white than that species. Adult males have extensive black spots on the breast and a black face mask with white chin and spots below and round the eye; in females, the black markings are smaller and less well marked. Juveniles are even paler and sandy coloured, with little or no black.

== Behaviour ==
It is resident or nomadic, noted for being mysteriously elusive, often hard to find; it lives singly or in small flocks, exceptionally up to 50 together. It feeds mainly on seeds, but also takes insects, including ants and locusts, these particularly being fed to nestlings. It breeds from February to May, laying 3–5 eggs in a nest on the ground lined with vegetation, often in shelter behind a stone or a shrub. Males have a territorial song delivered in flight.

== Gallery ==
Adult, Saudi Arabia 1993

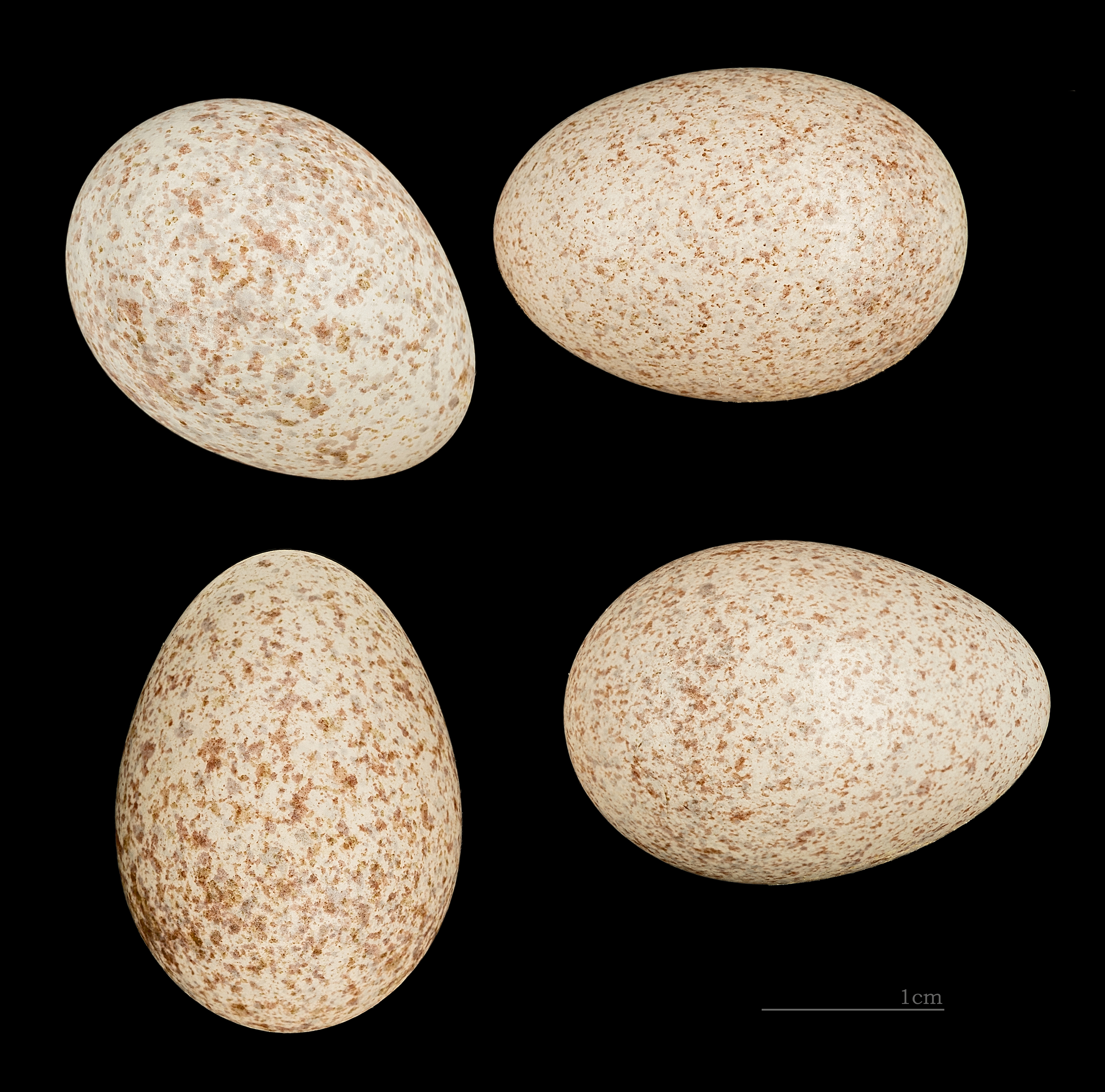
Eggs of Ramphocoris clotbey MHNT
