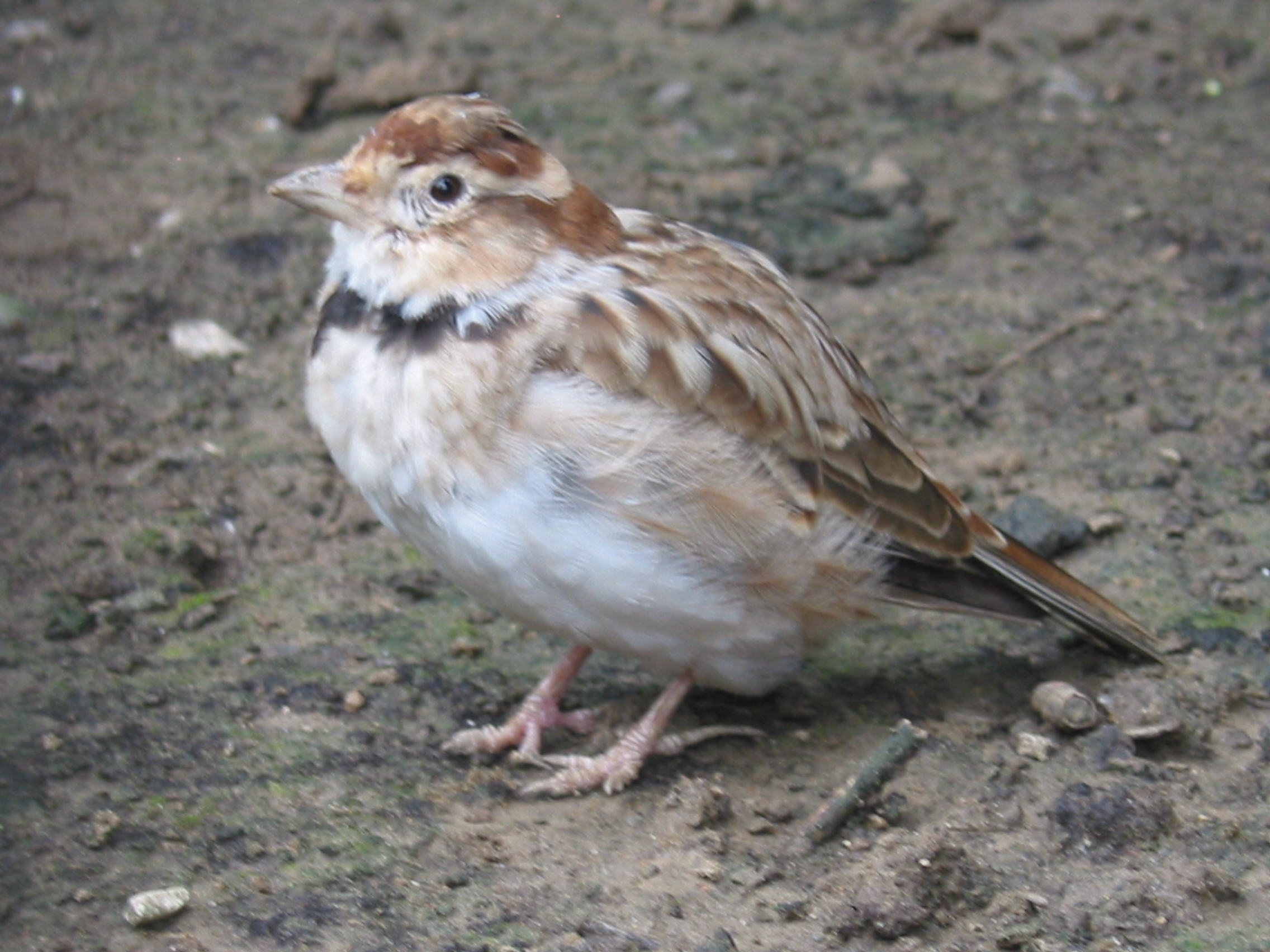

Conservation status
- Least Concern (IUCN 3.1)

Scientific classification
- Kingdom: Animalia
- Phylum: Chordata
- Class: Aves
- Order: Passeriformes
- Family: Alaudidae
- Genus: Melanocorypha
- Species: M. mongolica

Binomial name
- Melanocorypha mongolica (Pallas, 1776)
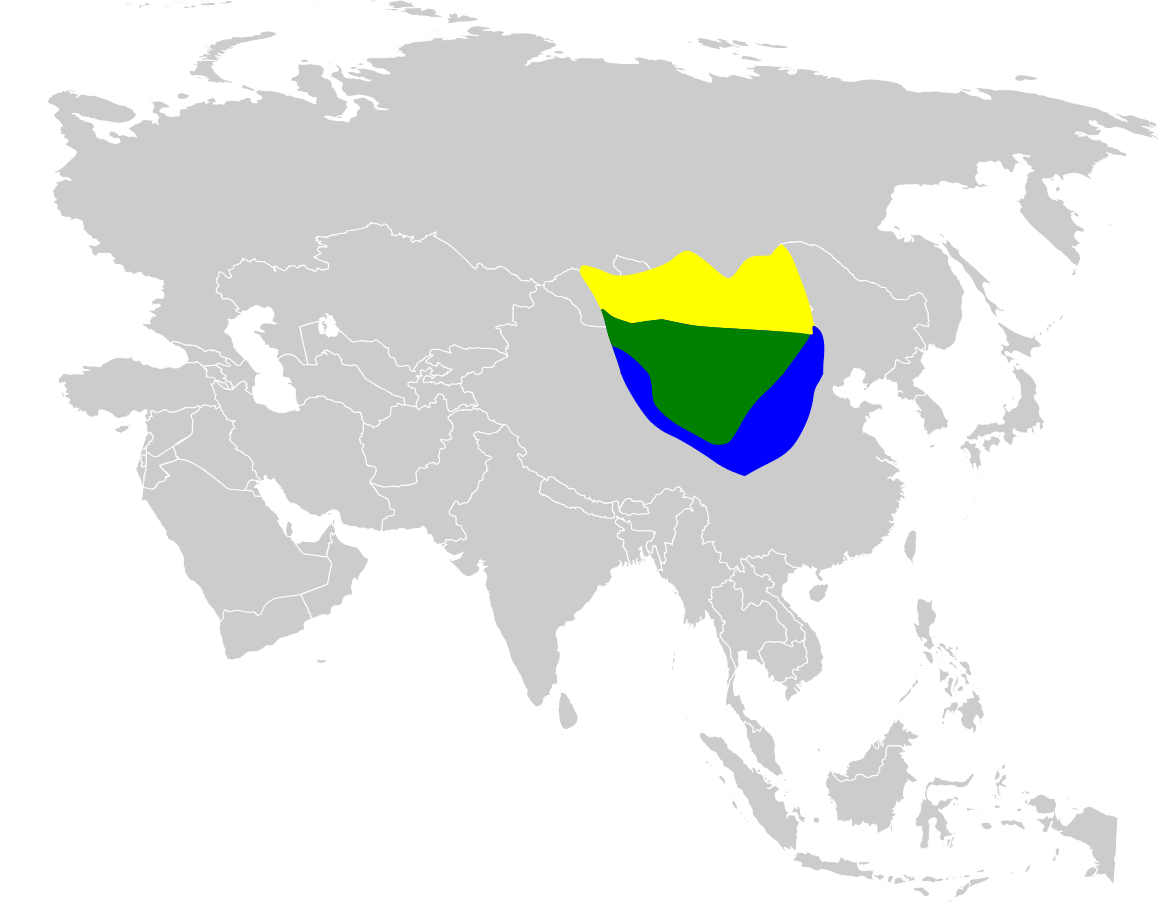
- Mongolian lark range, green - resident, yellow - breeding, blue - non-breeding

Synonyms
- Alauda mongolica

= Mongolian lark =

Species of bird

The Mongolian lark (Melanocorypha mongolica) is a species of lark in the family Alaudidae found from southern Russia and Mongolia to central China.

The Mongolian lark is known for its elaborate singing and even well into adulthood, is able to learn new songs. While female Mongolian larks don't sing, they have noteworthy song control nuclei with strong connectivity. Male Mongolian larks have large song bouts and song phrases that allow them to have extremely large song control nuclei.

It is an indicator species for avian biodiversity in the Mongolian steppes.

It is most often seen alone.

Its predators include the Saker Falcon.

== Taxonomy and systematics ==
The black lark was originally placed in the genus Alauda. Alternate names for the black lark include Mongolian sand-lark and Mongolian skylark.

== Description ==
Its head is pale brown, with a red crown. Its upper part is reddish-brown, and its lower part is yellowish-white.

== Nesting ==
On average, it lays clutches of 3.3 eggs and incubates them for 13 days. They remain nestlings for 10 days. About half of its eggs tend to survive.

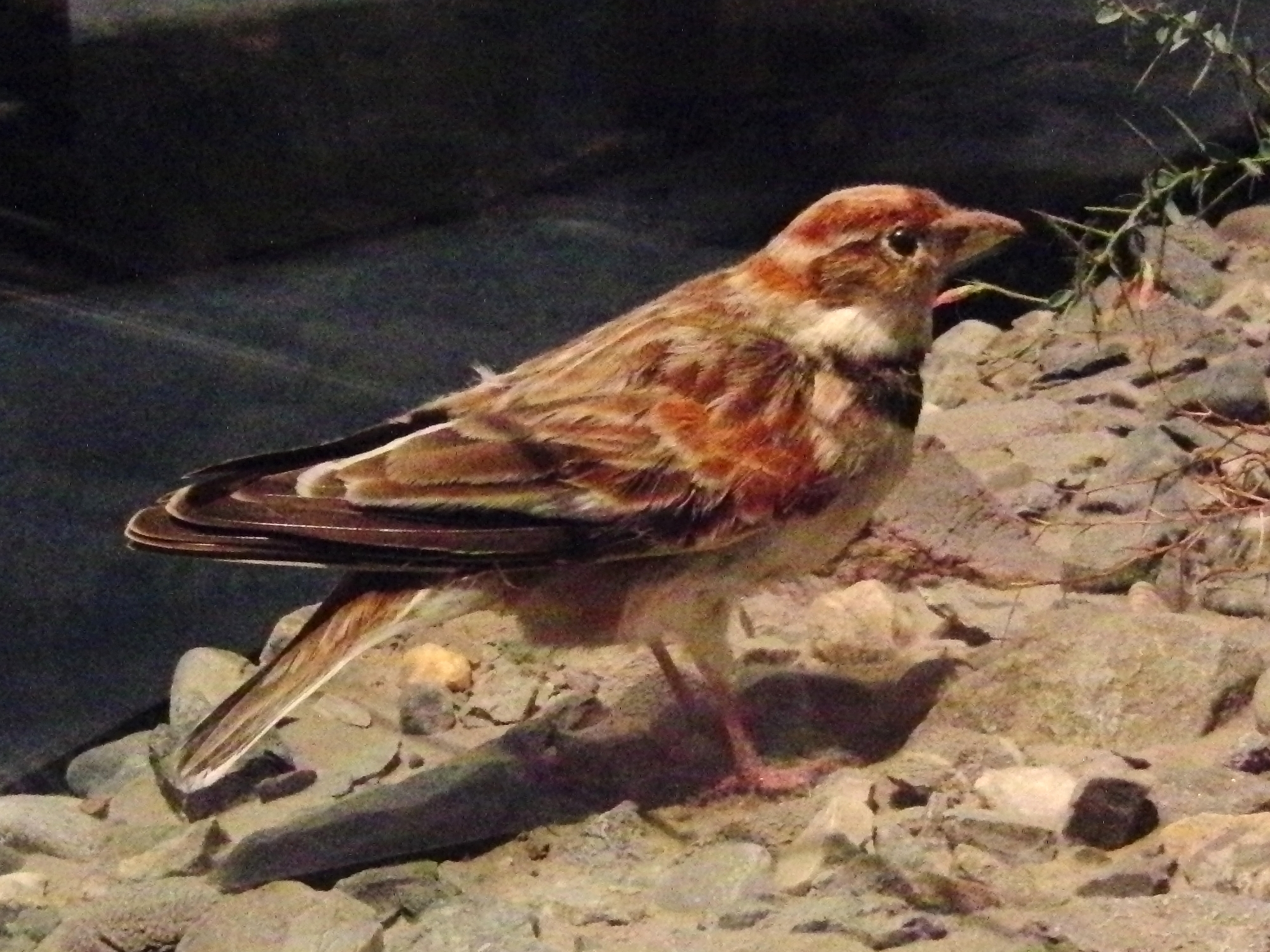
Stuffed specimen of a Mongolian lark (Melanocorypha mongolica) at the National Museum of Nature and Science, Tokyo, Japan
