= Melanocorypha serdicensis =

Melanocorypha serdicensis Temporal range: Late Miocene

Scientific classification
- Kingdom: Animalia
- Phylum: Chordata
- Class: Aves
- Order: Passeriformes
- Family: Alaudidae
- Genus: Melanocorypha
- Species: †M. serdicensis

Binomial name
- †Melanocorypha serdicensis Boev, 2012

Extinct species of bird

Melanocorypha serdicensis is an extinct species of lark in the genus Melanocorypha that inhabited Bulgaria during the Neogene period.
