= Melanocorypha minor =

Melanocorypha minor Temporal range: Pliocene

Scientific classification
- Kingdom: Animalia
- Phylum: Chordata
- Class: Aves
- Order: Passeriformes
- Family: Alaudidae
- Genus: Melanocorypha
- Species: †M. minor

Binomial name
- †Melanocorypha minor Kessler, 2013

Extinct species of bird

Melanocorypha minor is an extinct species of Melanocorypha that inhabited Hungary during the Neogene period.

== Etymology ==
The specific epithet "minor" is derived from its small size.
