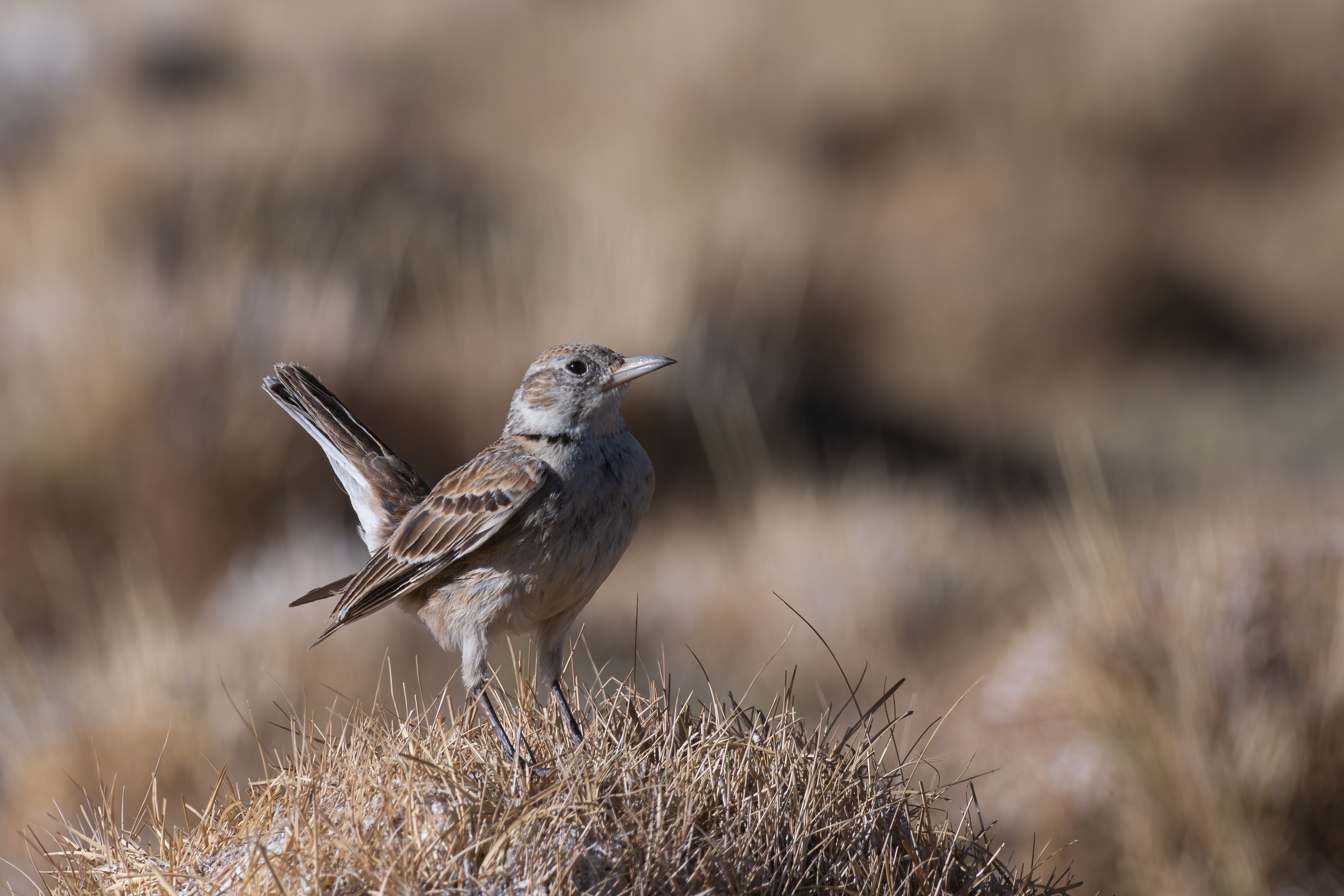

Conservation status
- Least Concern (IUCN 3.1)

Scientific classification
- Kingdom: Animalia
- Phylum: Chordata
- Class: Aves
- Order: Passeriformes
- Family: Alaudidae
- Genus: Melanocorypha
- Species: M. maxima

Binomial name
- Melanocorypha maxima Blyth, 1867
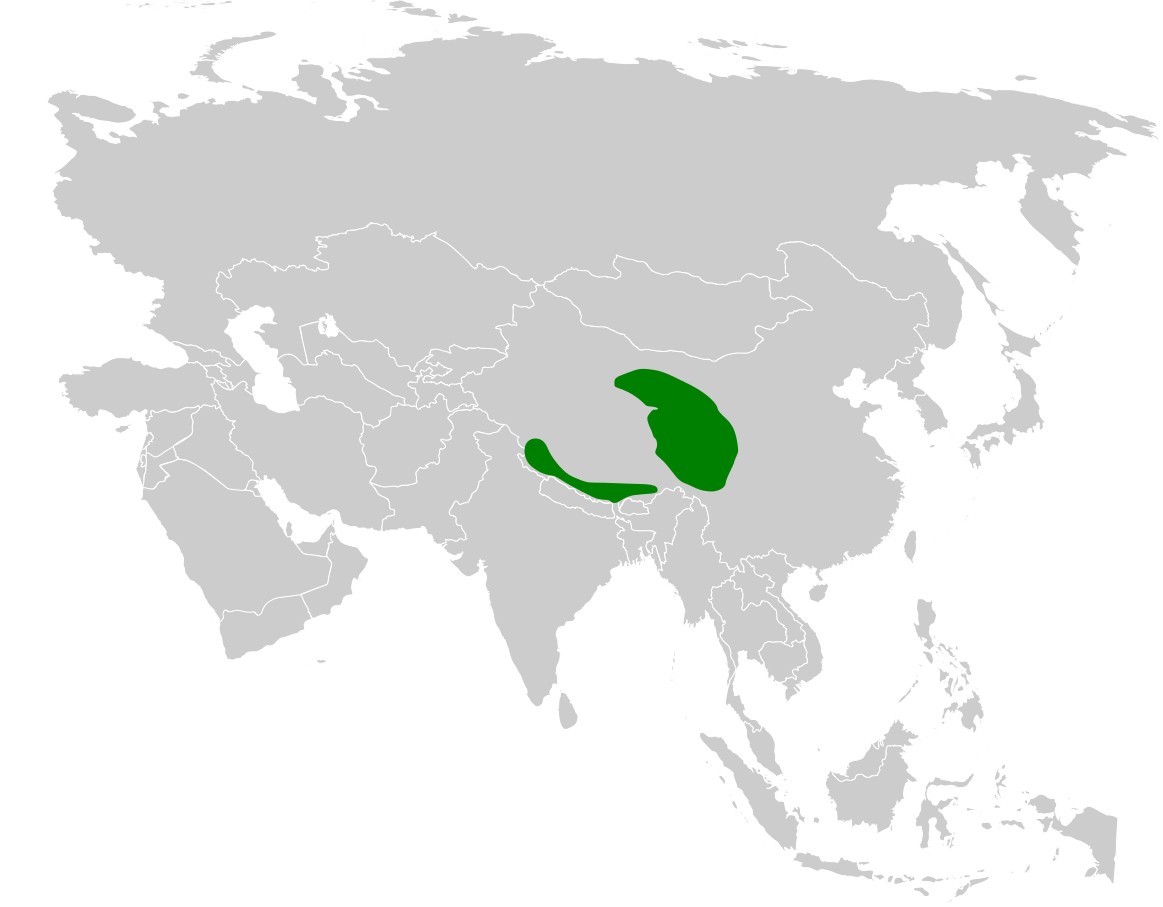
- range

= Tibetan lark =

Species of bird

The Tibetan lark (Melanocorypha maxima) is a species of lark in the family Alaudidae found on the Tibetan Plateau from north-western India to central China. Alternate names for this species include the Asiatic lark, long-billed calandra lark and long-billed lark.
