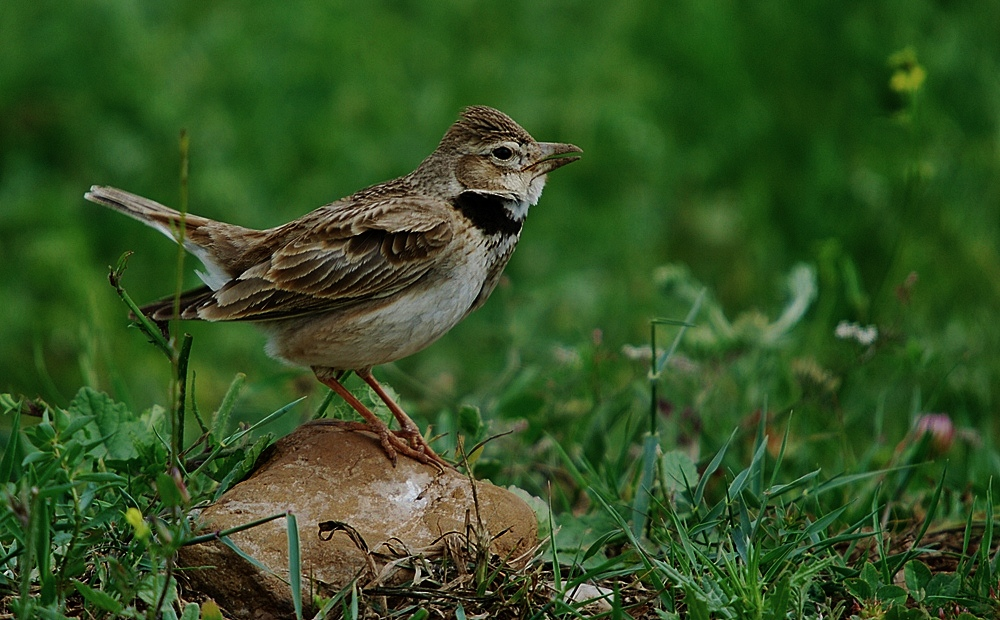
- Calandra lark (Melanocorypha calandra)

Scientific classification
- Kingdom: Animalia
- Phylum: Chordata
- Class: Aves
- Order: Passeriformes
- Family: Alaudidae
- Genus: Melanocorypha; F. Boie, 1828

Type species
- Alauda tatarica Pallas, 1773

Species
- M. calandra M. bimaculata M. maxima M. mongolica M. yeltoniensis

= Melanocorypha =

Genus of birds

Melanocorypha is a small genus of birds in the lark family. The current genus name, Melanocorypha is from Ancient Greek melas, "black", and koruphos a term used by ancient writer for a now unknown bird, but here confused with korudos, "lark".

== Taxonomy and systematics ==
Established by Friedrich Boie in 1828, the genus Melanocorypha has five extant and at least three extinct species.

=== Extant species ===
There are five species recognized in the genus:

| Image | Scientific name | Common name | Distribution |
|---|---|---|---|
| | Melanocorypha bimaculata | Bimaculated lark | Turkey into central Asia |
| | Melanocorypha calandra | Calandra lark | the Mediterranean and eastwards through Turkey into northern Iran and southern Russia |
| | Melanocorypha yeltoniensis | Black lark | south-eastern Russia and Kazakhstan. |
| | Melanocorypha mongolica | Mongolian lark | southern Russia and Mongolia to central China |
| | Melanocorypha maxima | Tibetan lark | Tibetan plateau from north-western India to central China |

=== Extinct species ===
There is at least three fossil species included in this genus:

- †Melanocorypha serdicensis (late Miocene from Hrabarsko, Bulgaria)
- †Melanocorypha donchevi (late Pliocene from Varshets, Bulgaria)
- †Melanocorypha minor (Pliocene of Beremend, Hungary)

=== Former species ===
Formerly, some authorities classified the following species as belonging to the genus Melanocorypha:

- Thick-billed lark (as Melanocorypha clot-bey)
- Bar-tailed lark (as Melanocorypha cinctura)
- White-winged lark (as Melanocorypha leucoptera or Melanocorypha sibirica)

== Description ==
Melanocorypha larks are large, robust birds, 16.5–20 cm long with strong thick bills. Some have the typically undistinguished lark plumage, mainly streaked greyish-brown above and white below, but the, black and white-winged larks have distinctive male plumages. Several species have large black patches on the breast sides.

In flight they show broad wings and a shortish tail. The songs of most species are like that of the skylark.

== Distribution and habitat ==
The members of Melanocorypha occur mainly in temperate Asia from Turkey through central Asia to China, but the calandra lark also has an extensive European distribution around the Mediterranean. These larks are mostly partially migratory, moving relatively short distances from the coldest parts of their ranges. Several species are very rare vagrants to western Europe.

These are birds of open cultivation, steppe or semi-desert. They nest on the ground and the young are precocial. The food is seeds supplemented with insects especially in the breeding season. They are gregarious outside the breeding season.
