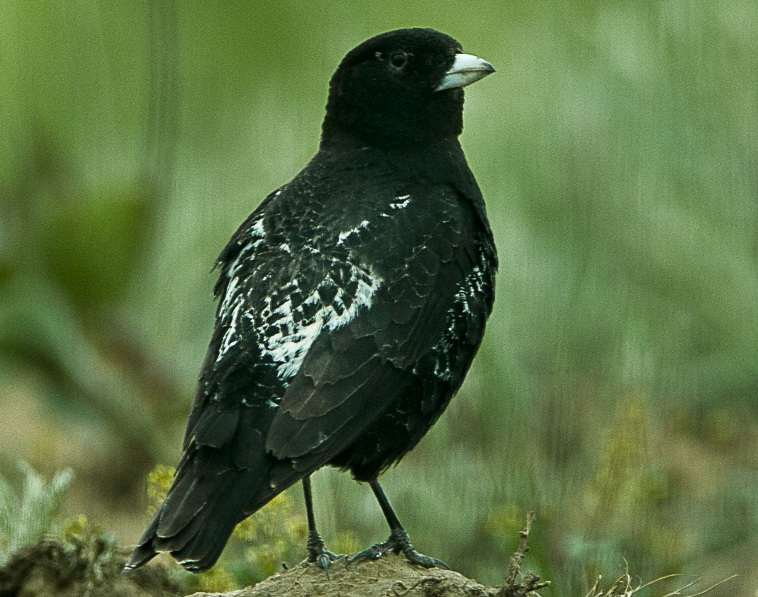

Conservation status
- Least Concern (IUCN 3.1)

Scientific classification
- Kingdom: Animalia
- Phylum: Chordata
- Class: Aves
- Order: Passeriformes
- Family: Alaudidae
- Genus: Melanocorypha
- Species: M. yeltoniensis

Binomial name
- Melanocorypha yeltoniensis (Forster, 1768)
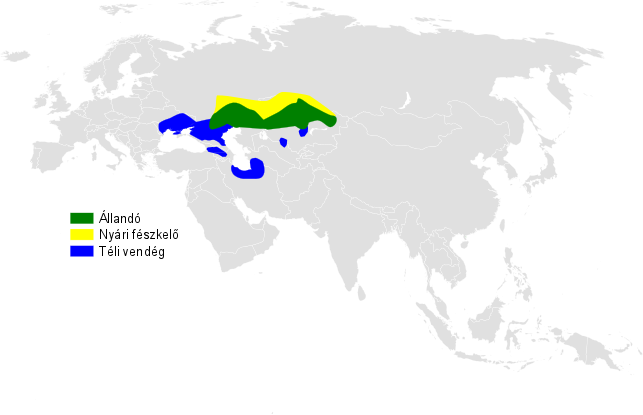

Synonyms
- Alauda yeltoniensis

= Black lark =

Species of bird

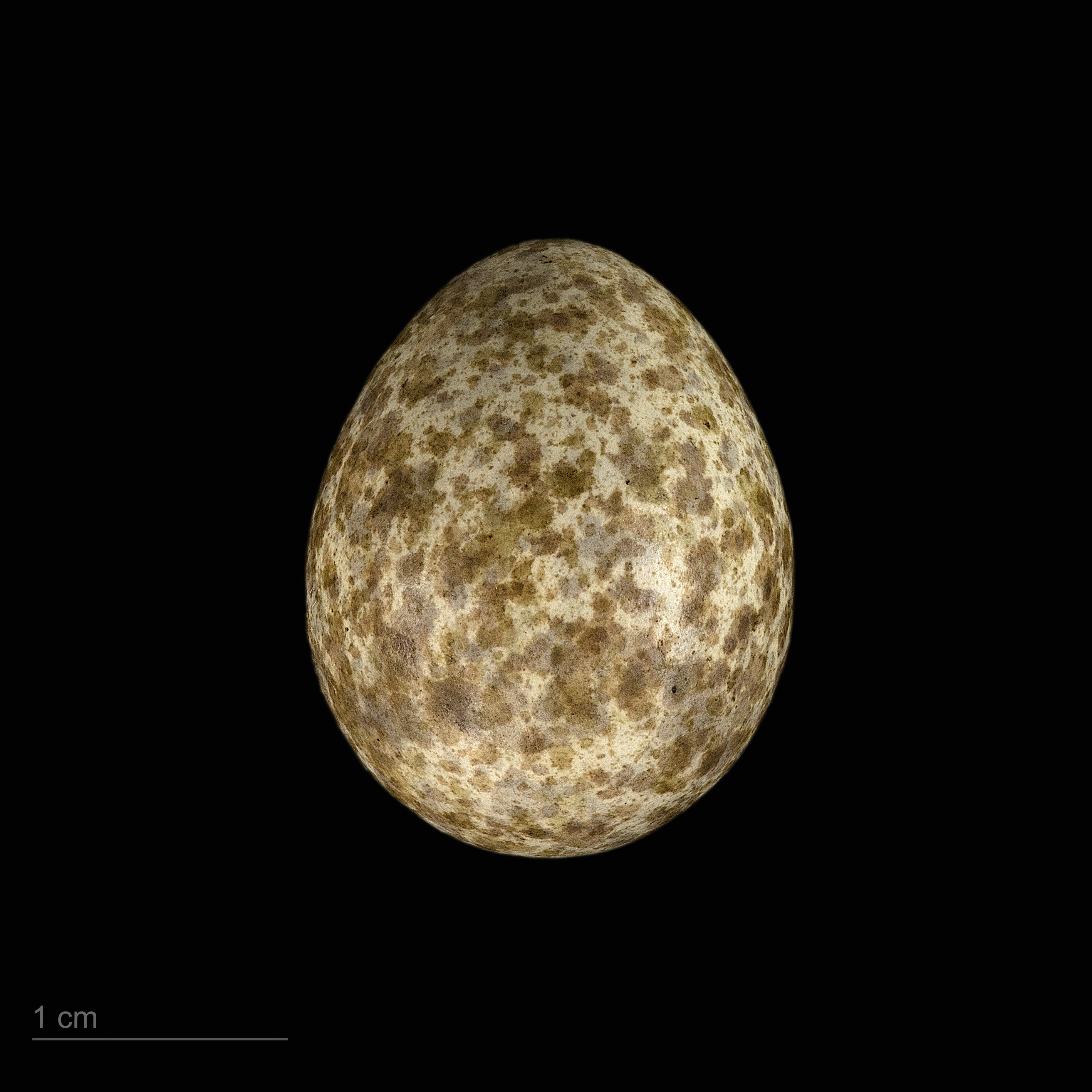
Melanocorypha yeltoniensis

The black lark (Melanocorypha yeltoniensis) is a species of lark in the family Alaudidae found in south-eastern Russia and Kazakhstan.

== Taxonomy and systematics ==
The black lark was originally placed in the genus Alauda. The current genus name is from Ancient Greek. Melanocorypha is from melas, "black", and koruphos a term used by ancient writers for a now unknown bird, but here confused with korudos, "lark". The specific yeltoniensis is from Lake Yelton in the Volgograd region of Russia.

== Description ==
This is a large, robust lark, 18–20.5 cm (7.1–8.1 in) in length. The adult male is unmistakable, being all black with some pale feather fringes on its back, and with a yellowish or pink bill. The female is undistinguished in comparison, mainly dark-blotched grey above and paler below. Her legs and underwing are black.

The song is like a frantic version of that of Eurasian skylark.

== Distribution and habitat ==
This is a bird of open steppe, often near water. It is partially migratory, with birds from the northwest of its breeding range moving south-east to winter further into Russia and neighbouring countries, as far as the northern Black Sea coasts in southern Ukraine.

The black lark is a very rare vagrant away from its breeding range, with records during both spring and autumn passage periods, and also in winter; the following is a complete list of European records away from the breeding range and normal wintering range as of 2005.

- 1803 Italy. A male at Alessandria, Piedmont, on an unknown date in autumn
- 19th Century Austria. Three males, one shot, at Breitensee, Vienna, on an unknown date between 1857 & 1874
- 1874 North Sea. A female on Heligoland (then British) on 27 April
- 1892 North Sea. A male on Heligoland (then German) on 27 July
- 1897 Moldova. One in March
- 1900 Romania. One in Dobruja in March
- 1914 Turkey. One at Küçükçekmece, Istanbul, on 14 October
- 1929 Malta. One in winter
- 1930 Greece. One at Athens in spring
- 1958 Greece A male at Athens on 20 April
- 1961 Italy. One at Manfredonia, Apulia, on 3 May
- 1963 Greece. A flock of eight at Lake Koronia on 20 February
- 1964 Greece. Two at the Axios Delta on 8 February
- 1981 Czech Republic. A male at Zakupy on 28 November
- 1984 Great Britain. (England) A male at Spurn, Yorkshire on 27 April
- 1988 Poland. One at Kosienice on 17 January
- 1989 Finland. A male at Joensuu on 24 March
- 1989 Finland. A male at Korpo on 8 April
- 1993 Sweden. A male at Karlstad on 6 & 7 May
- 1995 Bulgaria. A female at Cape Kaliakra on 25 May
- 2003 Great Britain. (Wales) A male at RSPB South Stack, Anglesey from 1 to 8 June

An individual was also recorded on an unknown date (prior to 2003) in Lebanon.

== Behaviour and ecology ==
Its nest is on the ground, with 4–5 eggs being laid. Food is seeds and insects, the latter especially in the breeding season. It is gregarious in winter.
