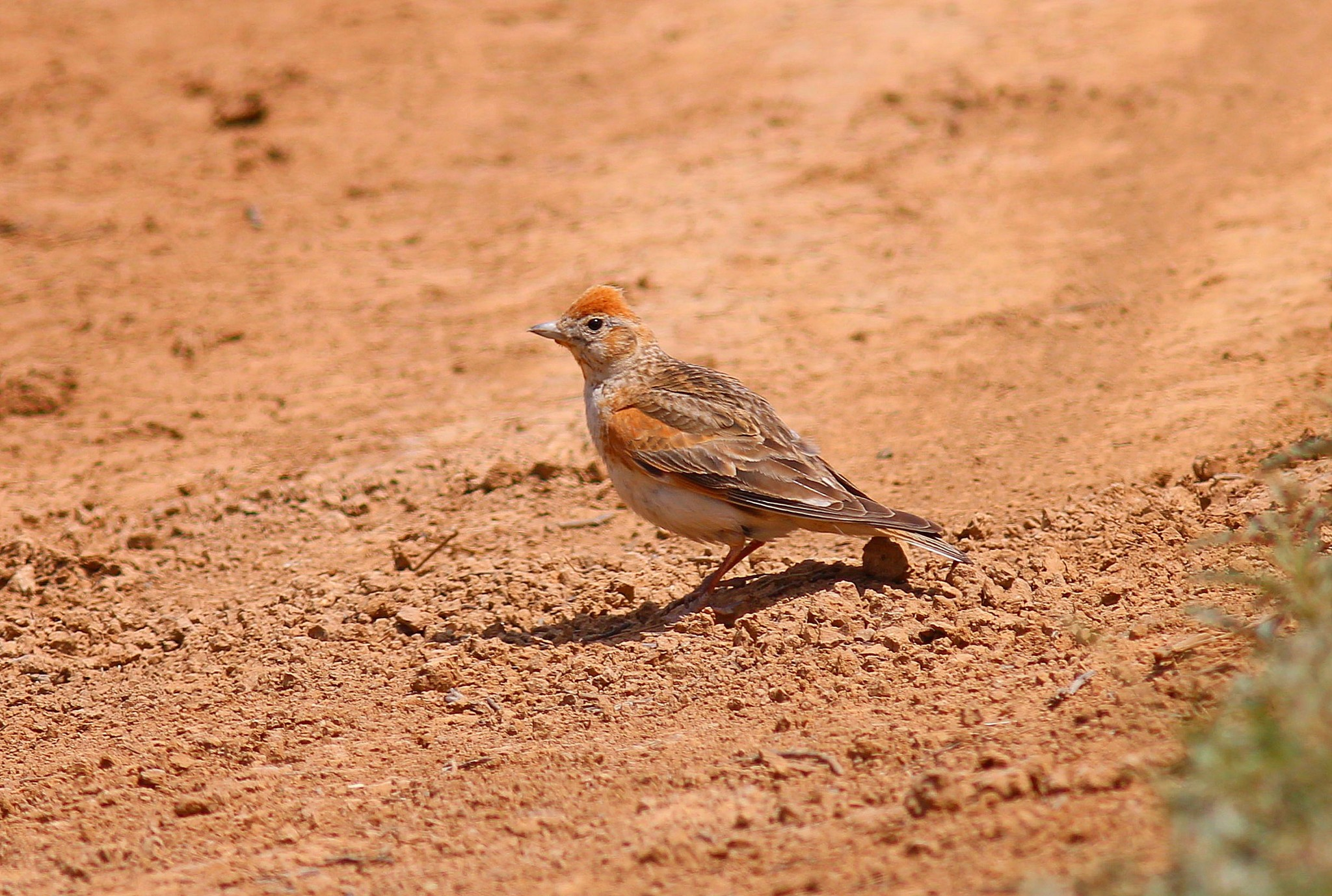

Conservation status
- Least Concern (IUCN 3.1)

Scientific classification
- Kingdom: Animalia
- Phylum: Chordata
- Class: Aves
- Order: Passeriformes
- Family: Alaudidae
- Genus: Alauda
- Species: A. leucoptera

Binomial name
- Alauda leucoptera Pallas, 1811
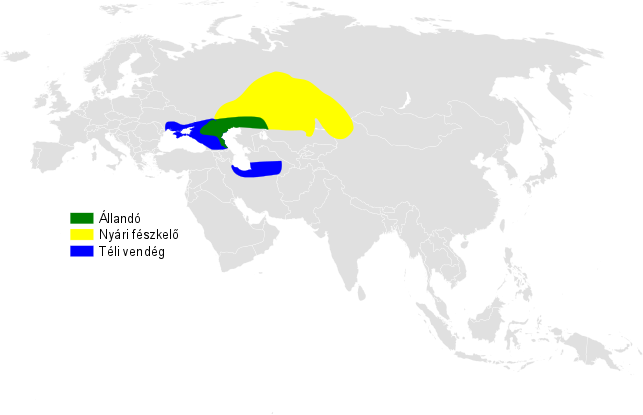

Synonyms
- Melanocorypha leucoptera; Melanocorypha sibirica

= White-winged lark =

Species of bird

The white-winged lark (Alauda leucoptera) is a species of lark breeding from southwestern Russia east through south-central Russia and Kazakhstan to the extreme west of China. It is partially migratory, with birds moving southwest in winter, west to southern Ukraine and south to northern Iran. The southernmost breeding birds are mainly resident. It is a very rare vagrant to western Europe.

== Taxonomy and systematics ==
The current genus name is from the Latin for lark. The specific leucoptera means "white-winged", from leukos, "white", and pteron, "wing". Formerly, the white-winged lark was classified as belonging to the genus Melanocorypha until moved to Alauda in 2014 following a 2013 genetic study of the family which showed it was more closely related to Alauda than Melanocorypha.

== Description ==
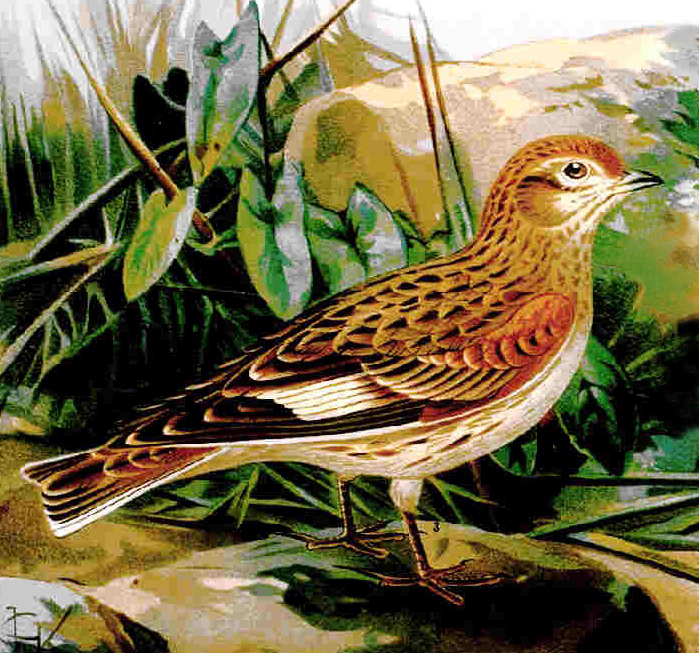

This lark with flashing white wing patches is large and robust, usually 17–19 cm in length, with a wingspan of 35 cm. Both sexes weigh about 44 g. In flight, it is unmistakable due to its striking wing pattern, with black outer flight feathers, white inner flight feathers, and the rest of the wing chestnut. Its body is dark-streaked grey above and whitish below. The adult male has a chestnut crown, but the sexes are otherwise similar.

=== Vocalisations ===
Its song is a more melodious version of the Eurasian skylark song.

== Behaviour and ecology ==
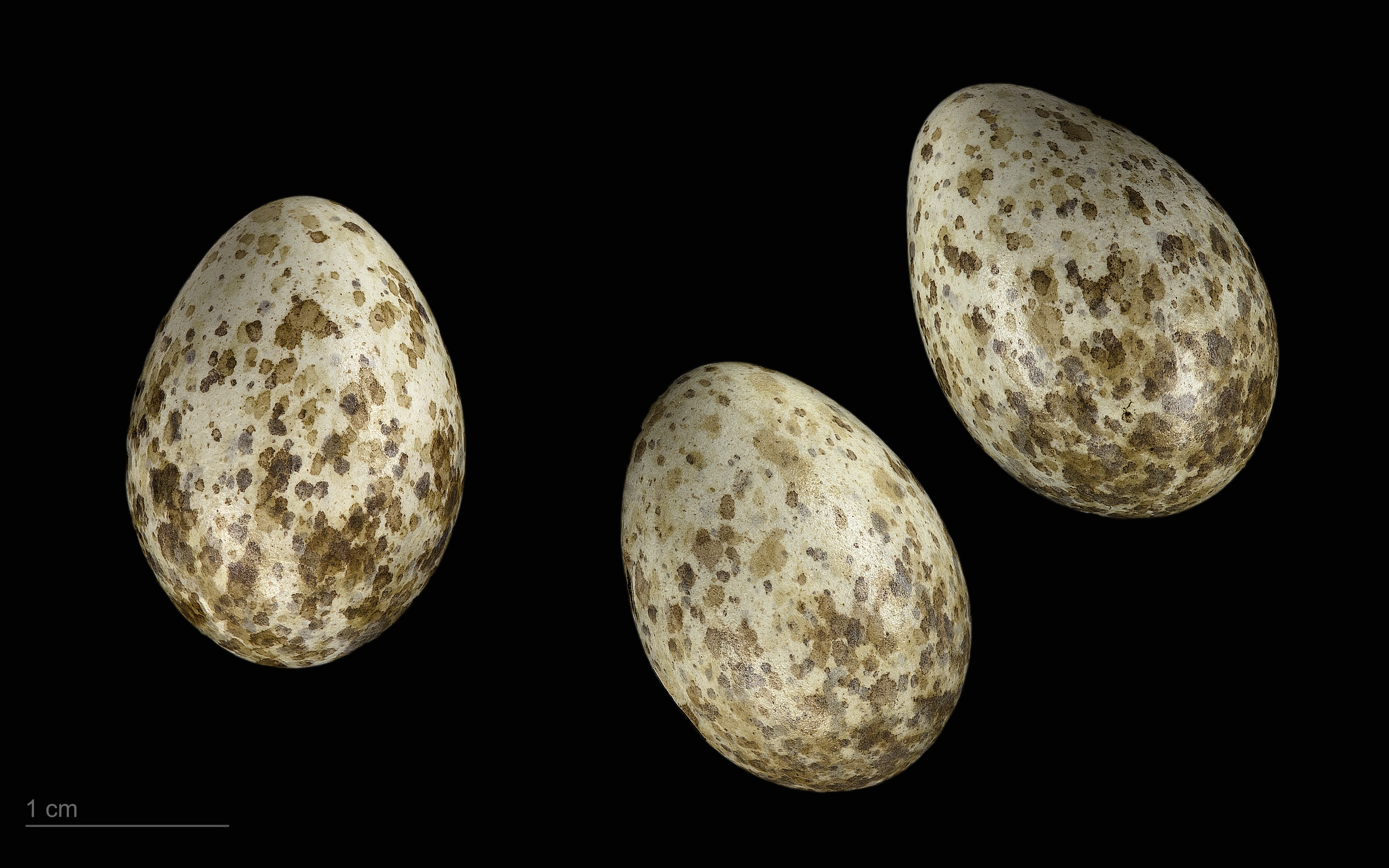
Alauda leucoptera eggs – MHNT

The white-winged lark lives in dry, open steppe and plains. It nests on the ground, laying three to eight eggs per clutch. Its diet consists of seeds, and insects during the breeding season. It is gregarious during the winter.

=== Threats ===
Habitat destruction due to ploughing and pesticide use are the main threats to the white-winged lark.

== Status ==
Although its population has declined significantly, it is still relatively common, and is not considered to be at risk.
