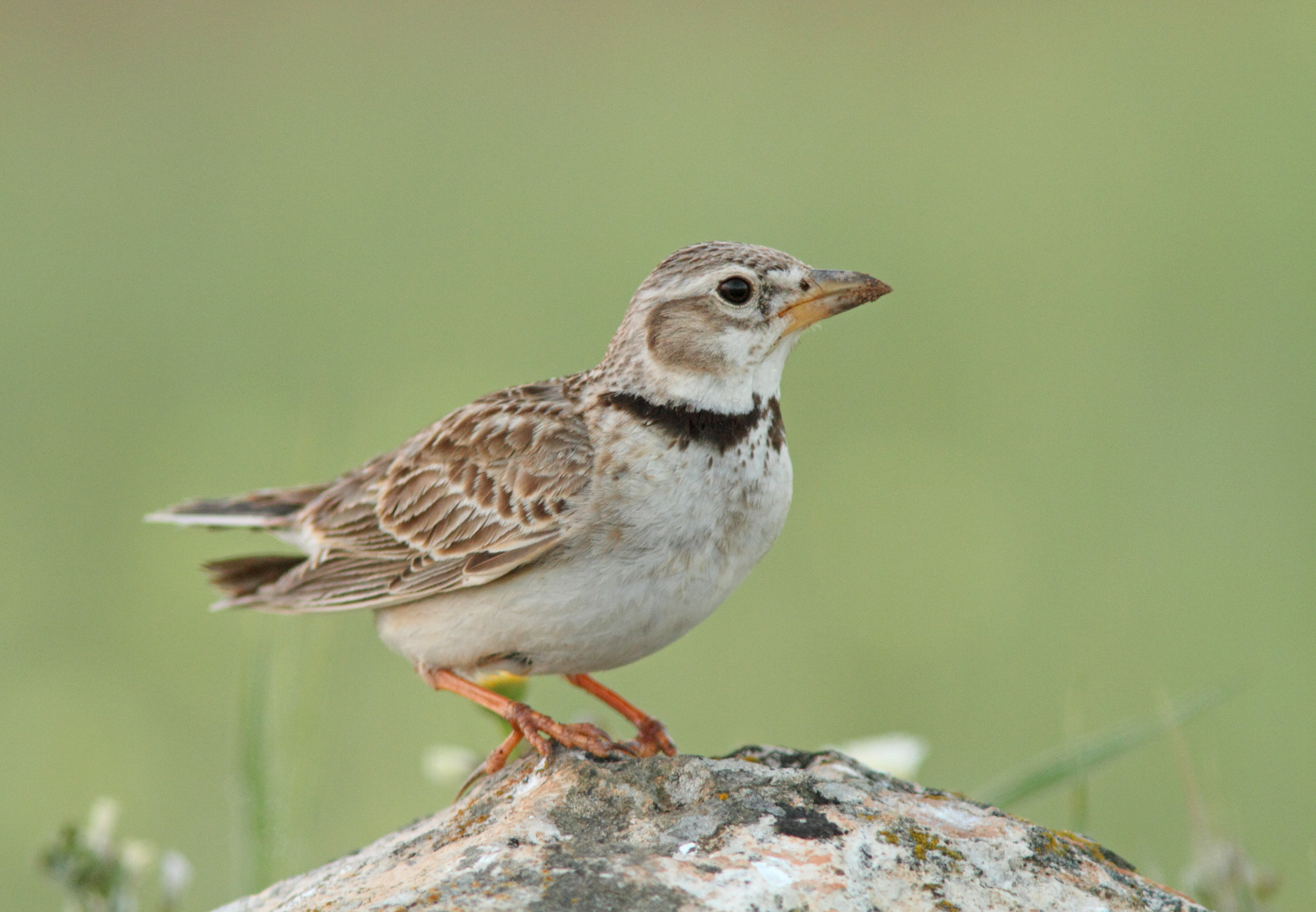
- In Extremadura, Spain

Conservation status
- Least Concern (IUCN 3.1)

Scientific classification
- Kingdom: Animalia
- Phylum: Chordata
- Class: Aves
- Order: Passeriformes
- Family: Alaudidae
- Genus: Melanocorypha
- Species: M. calandra

Binomial name
- Melanocorypha calandra (Linnaeus, 1766)
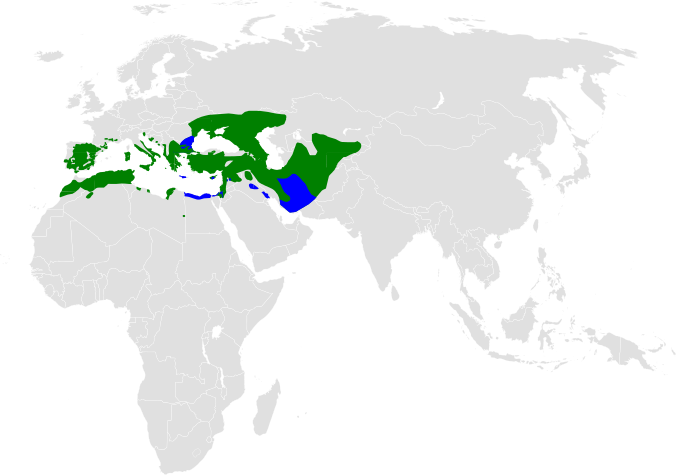

Synonyms
- Alauda calandra Linnaeus, 1766

= Calandra lark =

Species of bird

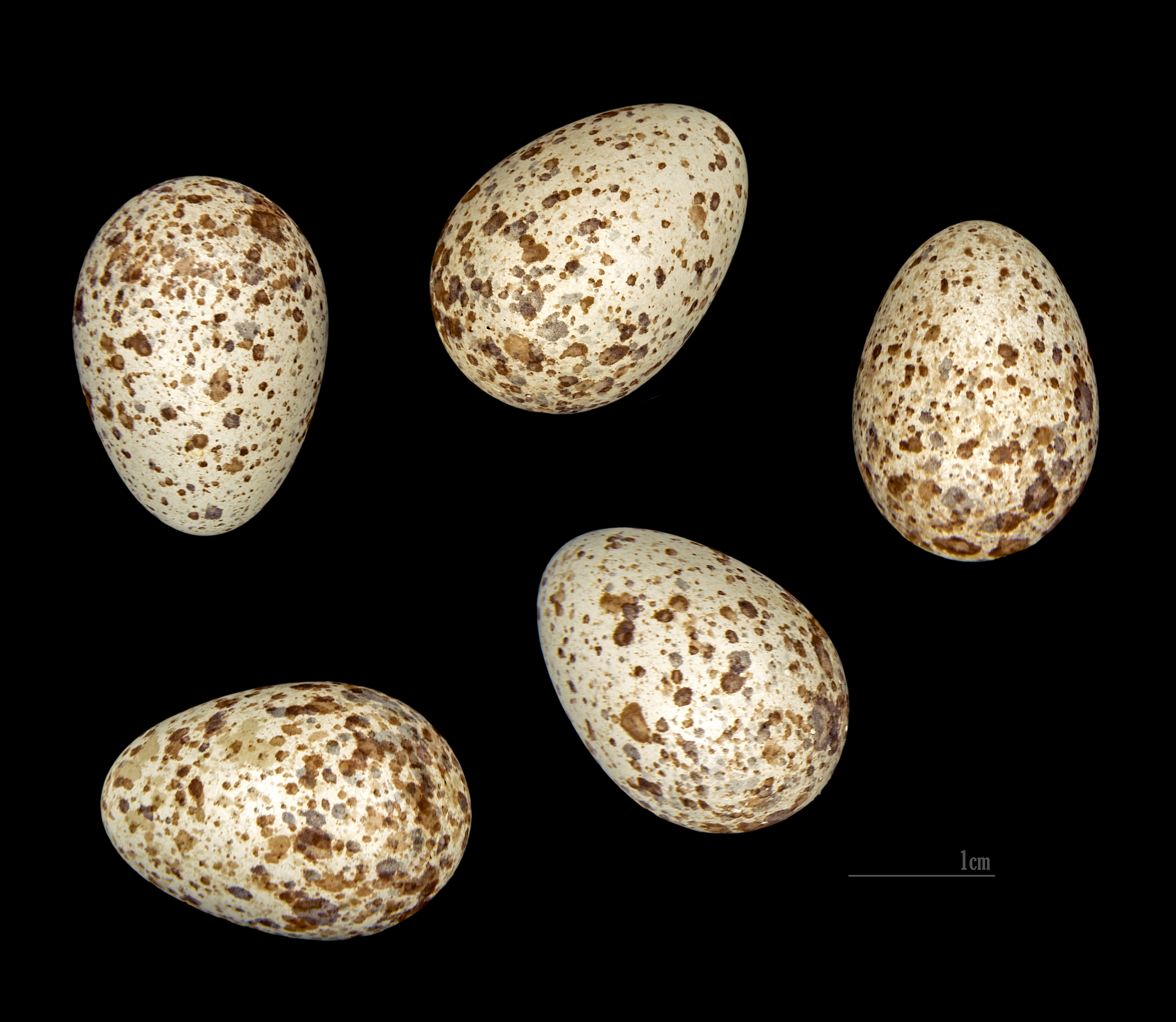
Eggs of Melanocorypha calandra MHNT

The calandra lark (Melanocorypha calandra) or European calandra-lark breeds in warm temperate countries around the Mediterranean and eastwards through Turkey into northern Iran and southern Russia. It is replaced further east by its relative, the bimaculated lark.

== Taxonomy and systematics ==
The calandra lark was originally placed in the genus Alauda. The current genus name, Melanocorypha is from Ancient Greek melas, "black", and koruphos a term used by ancient writers for a now unknown bird, but here confused with korudos, "lark". "Calandra"' derives ultimately from kalandros the Ancient Greek name for this bird. The bimaculated lark is also sometimes termed as the calandra lark.

=== Subspecies ===
Four subspecies are recognized:

- Western calandra lark (M. c. calandra) - (Linnaeus, 1766): Found in southern Europe and north-western Africa to Turkey (except south-central and south-eastern Turkey), Transcaucasia and north-western Iran
- Eastern calandra lark (M. c. psammochroa) - Hartert, 1904: Found from northern Iraq and northern Iran to Turkmenistan and Kazakhstan
- M. c. gaza - Meinertzhagen, R, 1919: Originally described as a subspecies of the bimaculated lark. Found from eastern Syria and south-eastern Turkey to south-western Iran
- Levant calandra lark (M. c. hebraica) - Meinertzhagen, R, 1920: Found from south-central Turkey and north-western Syria to Israel and western Jordan

== Description ==
This is a large, robust lark, 17.5–20 cm long. It is an undistinguished-looking species on the ground, mainly streaked greyish brown above and white below, and with large black patches on the breast sides. It has a white supercilium.

In flight it shows short broad wings, which are dark below, and a short white-edged tail. The wing and tail patterns are distinctions from its more easterly relatives.

The song is like a slower version of that of the skylark.

== Distribution and habitat ==
It is mainly resident in the west of its range, but Russian populations of this passerine bird are more migratory, moving further south in winter, as far as the Arabian Peninsula and Egypt. It is a very rare vagrant to western Europe.

This is a bird of open cultivation and steppe. Its nest is on the ground, with 4–5 eggs being laid. Food is seeds supplemented with insects in the breeding season. It is gregarious outside the breeding season.

== Behaviour and ecology ==
This species occupies open plains, from steppes and pastures to extensive dry cereal cultivations and true steppe with dense grass cover. In the Mediterranean Basin it is mainly found in dry pastures and dry cultivations. In cultivated areas, it prefers fallows, long-fallows and field edges and to a lesser extent sown fields, selecting unirrigated legumes and barley fields. The species is monogamous and lays eggs from early April to July. The nest is made from grass stems and small leaves, lined with softer material and built in a shallow depression on the ground, often under a tussock. Clutches are usually three to six eggs (de Juana and Suárez 2004). Its diet is seasonal, feeding mostly on insects in the summers and seeds and grass shoots in the winter. Mediterranean populations are resident, forming large flocks in the autumn and winter (Snow and Perrins 1998, de Juana and Suárez 2004). Eastern populations are migratory or partially migratory (de Juana and Suárez 2004).

Parasites of the calandra lark include the chewing louse Ricinus vaderi, described from specimens collected in Azerbaijan.

== In culture ==
The song is considered so musical to human ears that the calandra lark was formerly a popular cagebird in its range. It is mentioned in, for instance, the Tuscan proverb "Canta come una calandra", he or she sings like a lark, and the Spanish ballad "Romance del prisionero", where its song is the only way the prisoner knows when day breaks.
