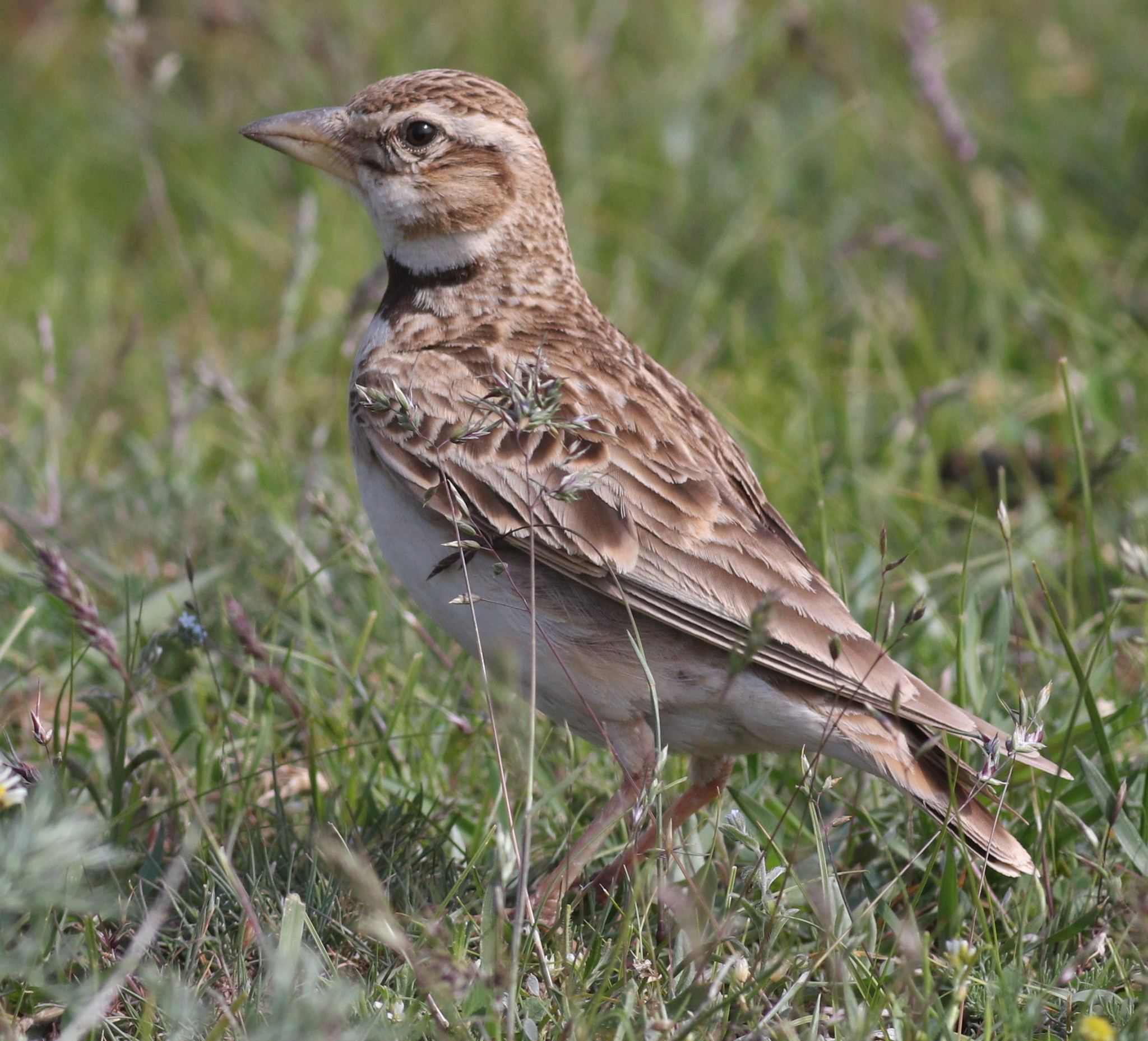

Conservation status
- Least Concern (IUCN 3.1)

Scientific classification
- Kingdom: Animalia
- Phylum: Chordata
- Class: Aves
- Order: Passeriformes
- Family: Alaudidae
- Genus: Melanocorypha
- Species: M. bimaculata

Binomial name
- Melanocorypha bimaculata (Ménétriés, 1832)
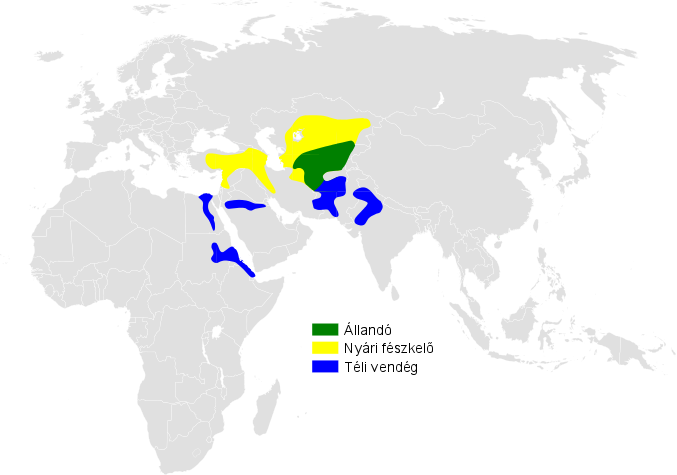

Synonyms
- Alauda bimaculata

= Bimaculated lark =

Species of bird

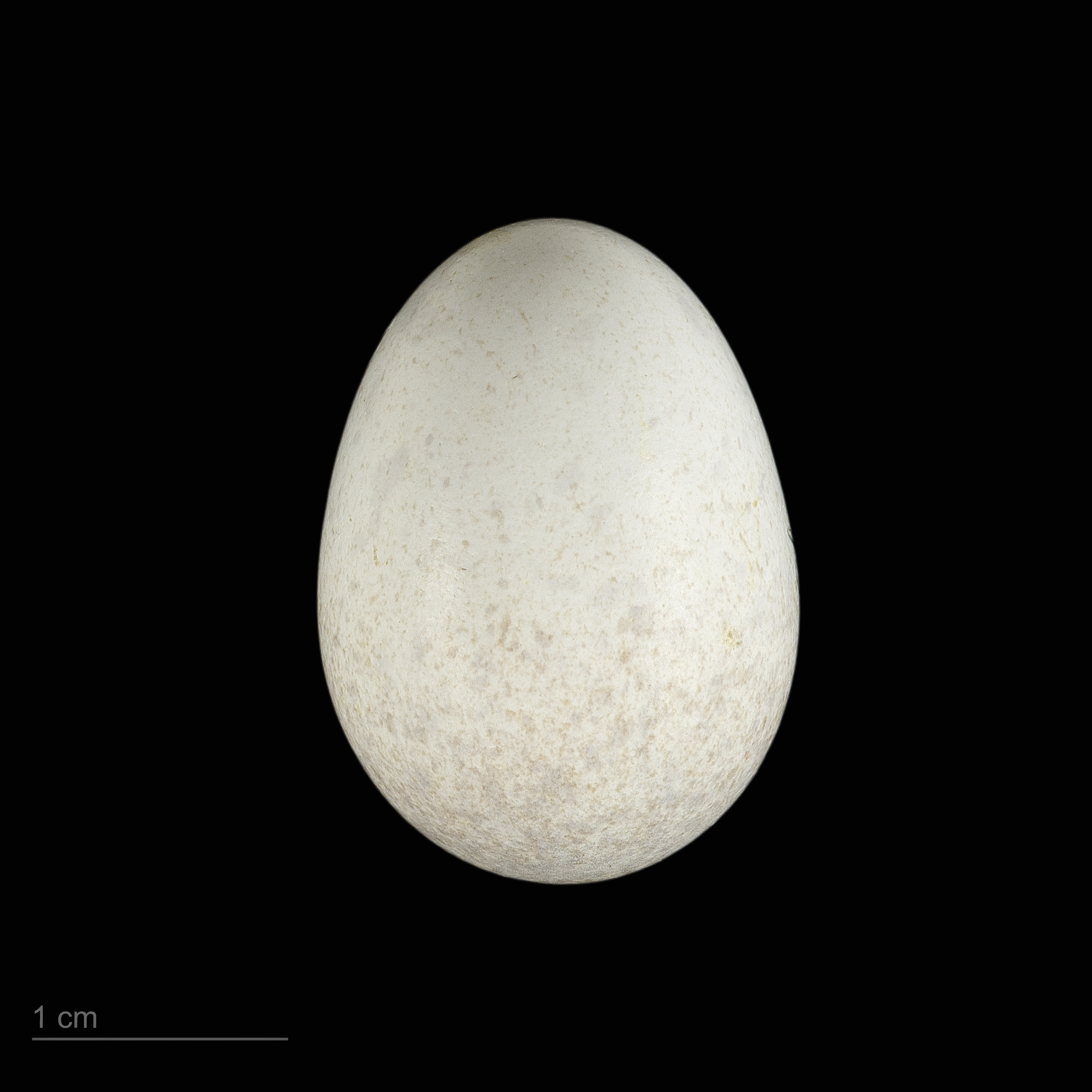
Melanocorypha bimaculata

The bimaculated lark (Melanocorypha bimaculata) breeds in warm temperate countries eastwards from Turkey into Central Asia. It is the eastern counterpart of its relative, the calandra lark.

== Taxonomy and systematics ==
The bimaculated lark was originally placed in the genus Alauda. The current genus name, Melanocorypha is from Ancient Greek melas, "black", and koruphos a term used by ancient writers for a now unknown bird, but here confused with korudos, "lark". "Bimaculate" and the specific bimaculata are from Neo-Latin bimaculatus, "two-spotted". The alternate name calandra lark should not be confused with the species of the same name. The alternate name Eastern calandra lark is also used for a subspecies of the calandra lark.

== Description ==
This is a large, robust lark, 16–18 cm in length. It is an undistinguished looking species on the ground, mainly streaked grey above and white below, and with two small black patches on the breast sides, which give this species its name. It has a white supercilium.

In flight it shows short broad wings, which are grey-brown below, and a short tail with a white tip, but not white edges. The wing and tail patterns are distinctions from its more westerly relative.

The song is like a harder version of that of calandra lark.

== Distribution and habitat ==
The bimaculated lark is found from west-central Turkey to southern Kazakhstan, Kyrgyzstan, north-eastern Iran and northern Afghanistan. It is also found in northern Israel, Lebanon, western Syria and northern Iraq. It is mainly migratory, wintering in northeast Africa, and ranges widely throughout the greater Middle East to Pakistan, India and Tibet. It is a very rare vagrant to western Europe.

This is a bird of stony semi-desert and higher altitude cultivation. Its nest is on the ground, with 3-4 eggs being laid. Food is seeds and insects, the latter especially in the breeding season. It is gregarious in winter.
