= 2012 in archosaur paleontology =

The year 2012 in archosaur paleontology was eventful. Archosaurs include the only living dinosaur group — birds — and the reptile crocodilians, plus all extinct dinosaurs, extinct crocodilian relatives, and pterosaurs. Archosaur palaeontology is the scientific study of those animals, especially as they existed before the Holocene Epoch began about 11,700 years ago. The year 2012 in paleontology included various significant developments regarding archosaurs.

This article records new taxa of fossil archosaurs of every kind that have been described during the year 2012, as well as other significant discoveries and events related to paleontology of archosaurs that occurred in the year 2012.

== Pseudosuchians ==
=== Research ===
- The postcranial skeleton of Sebecus icaeorhinus is described by Diego Pol et al. (2012).
- Skull anatomy of Dakosaurus and Plesiosuchus is described by Mark T. Young et al. (2012).
- Kemkemia auditorei, previously thought to be a theropod dinosaur, is reinterpreted as a member of Crocodyliformes by Gabriel Lio et al. (2012).
- A study including a supertree of Crocodyliformes is published by Mario Bronzati, Felipe Chinaglia Montefeltro and Max C. Langer (2012).
- Skull remains of a member of the genus Gavialis belonging or related to the species Gavialis bengawanicus are described from the Early Pleistocene of Thailand by Martin et al. (2012).

=== New taxa ===
Name	Novelty	Status	Authors	Age	Unit	Location	Notes	Images
Aegisuchus	Gen. et sp. nov	Valid	Holliday & Gardner	Cenomanian	Kem Kem Formation	Morocco	An aegyptosuchid eusuchian.	
Aetobarbakinoides	Gen. et sp. nov	Valid	Desojo, Ezcurra & Kischlat	Late Carnian or early Norian	Santa Maria Formation	Brazil	An aetosaur.	
Apachesuchus	Gen. et sp. nov	Valid	Spielmann & Lucas	Late Triassic		United States	An aetosaur. The type species is Apachesuchus heckerti.	
Barreirosuchus	Gen. et sp. nov	Valid	Iori & Garcia	Turonian to Santonian	Adamantina Formation	Brazil	A itasuchid. The type species is Barreirosuchus franciscoi.	
Borealosuchus threeensis	Sp. nov	Valid	Brochu, Parris, Grandstaff, Denton & Gallagher	Maastrichtian or Danian		USA	A crocodilian from New Jersey.	
Bystrowisuchus	Gen. et sp. nov	Valid	Sennikov	Early Triassic		Russia	A ctenosauriscid. The type species is Bystrowisuchus flerovi.	
Crocodylus thorbjarnarsoni	sp nov	Valid	Brochu & Storrs	Pliocene to Pleistocene		Kenya	A species of Crocodylus.	
Gasparinisuchus	Gen. et sp. nov	Valid	Martinelli et al.	Late Cretaceous		Argentina	A peirosaurid. The type species is Gasparinisuchus peirosauroides.	

== Newly named basal dinosauriforms ==
Name	Novelty	Status	Authors	Age	Unit	Location	Notes	Images
Diodorus	Gen. et sp. nov	Valid	Kammerer, Nesbitt, & Shubin	?Carnian-Norian	Timezgadiouine Formation	Morocco	A silesaurid.	

== Non-avian dinosaurs ==
=== Research ===
- A study including a large phylogenetic analysis of non-coelurosaurian tetanuran theropod dinosaurs is published by Matthew T. Carrano, Roger B. J. Benson and Scott D. Sampson (2012).
- A study including a systematic revision of the family Dromaeosauridae and a large phylogenetic analysis of paravian theropod dinosaurs (both avian and non-avian) is published by Alan Turner, Peter Makovicky and Mark Norell (2012).
- A specimen of Microraptor is described by Quanguo Li et al. (2012), with melanosome imprints making it possible to determine the plumage coloration and iridescence in the plumage.
- A new specimen of Austroraptor cabazai is described by Philip J. Currie and Ariana Paulina Carabajal (2012).
- A specimen of Mei long is described by Chunling Gao et al. (2012).
- A study of Khaan mckennai was published by Amy M. Balanoff and Mark Norell (2012).
- A new information on Yixianosaurus longimanus is published by T. Alexander Dececchi, Hans C. E. Larsson and David W. E. Hone (2012).
- Three specimens of Ornithomimus with evidence of feathers are described by Darla K. Zelenitsky et al. (2012).
- A new information on the anatomy of the holotype specimen of Nqwebasaurus thwazi is published by Jonah N. Choiniere, Catherine A. Forster and William J. de Klerk (2012).
- A study of Alioramus was published by Stephen Brusatte, Thomas D. Carr and Mark Norell (2012).
- Abdominal contents of two specimens of Sinocalliopteryx gigas are described by Lida Xing et al. (2012).
- A study of musculoskeletal anatomy, three-dimensional body proportions and body mass evolution in allosauroid theropod dinosaurs is published by Karl T. Bates, Roger B. J. Benson, and Peter L. Falkingham (2012).
- A study of the braincase of Sinraptor dongi is published by Ariana Paulina Carabajal and Philip J. Currie (2012).
- A study of Kelmayisaurus petrolicus, interpreting it as likely to be a member of Carcharodontosauridae, is published by Stephen L. Brusatte, Roger B.J. Benson and Xing Xu (2012).
- Description of pectoral girdle and forelimb of Majungasaurus crenatissimus is published by Sara H. Burch and Matthew T. Carrano (2012).
- A study of Early Cretaceous Australian theropod dinosaurs was published by Roger B. J. Benson et al. (2012).
- A study including a phylogenetic analysis of titanosauriform sauropod dinosaurs is published by Michael D'Emic (2012).
- The postcranial skeletal pneumaticity in the skeletons of five taxa of early sauropodomorph dinosaurs is described by Adam M. Yates, Mathew J. Wedel and Matthew F. Bonnan (2012).
- The study on the presumed course of the recurrent laryngeal nerve in sauropod dinosaurs is published by Mathew J. Wedel (2012).
- Pachysuchus, previously thought to be an Early Jurassic phytosaur, is reinterpreted as a sauropodomorph dinosaur by Paul M. Barrett and Xu Xing (2012).
- A study of vertebral laminae of sauropod dinosaurs is published by Jeffrey A. Wilson (2012).
- A study on the neural spine bifurcation in diplodocoid sauropod dinosaurs is published by D. Cary Woodruff and Denver W. Fowler (2012).
- A study of the postcranial skeletal pneumaticity in the skeletons of Saltasaurus, Neuquensaurus and Rocasaurus is published by Ignacio A. Cerda, Leonardo Salgado and Jaime E. Powell (2012).
- A study of Early Cretaceous sauropod dinosaurs from North America is published by Michael D. D’Emic and Brady Z. Foreman (2012). Among other findings, additional sauropod material from the Cloverly Formation of Wyoming was referred to Sauroposeidon, Paluxysaurus was synonymized with Sauroposeidon, Rugocaudia was considered a nomen dubium and the cause of the North American sauropod extinction in the middle of the Cretaceous period was discussed.
- The first sauropod dinosaur (a member of Titanosauria) from Antarctica described by Ignacio A. Cerda et al. (2012).
- A study of biomechanics, pectoral girdle articulation and body mass of the Triassic dinosaurs from Brazil (Staurikosaurus, Saturnalia, Pampadromaeus, Guaibasaurus and Unaysaurus) is published by Rafael Delcourt, Sergio A. K. de Azevedo, Orlando N. Grillo and Fernanda O. Deantoni (2012).
- Anatomy of Fruitadens haagarorum is described by Richard J. Butler et al. (2012).
- A study including a phylogenetic analysis of ankylosaurian dinosaurs is published by Richard S. Thompson et al. (2012).
- A study including a phylogenetic analysis of iguanodontian ornithopod dinosaurs is published by Andrew T. McDonald (2012).
- A study of the forearm orientation in hadrosaurids is published by Phil Senter (2012).
- Skin impressions of two different species of Saurolophus are described by Phil Bell (2012).
- A new description of Eolambia caroljonesa is published by Andrew T. McDonald et al. (2012).
- A study of anatomy and relationships of Bolong yixianensis is published by Wu Wenhao and Pascal Godefroit (2012).
- An overview of Early Cretaceous iguanodontian ornithopod dinosaurs of England and Belgium is published by David B. Norman (2012).
- A study of the bone histology of Tenontosaurus tilletti is published by Sarah Werning (2012).
- A study of the bone histology of Dysalotosaurus lettowvorbecki is published by Tom R. Hübner (2012).
- A study questioning the interpretation of Torosaurus as a junior synonym and a growth stage of Triceratops was published by Nicholas R. Longrich and Daniel J. Field (2012).
- A study of some of the earliest known dinosaur assemblages is published by Martín D. Ezcurra (2012). Among other findings, Teyuwasu is interpreted as a member of the clade Dinosauriformes of uncertain phylogenetic placement and a nomen dubium.
- A study of anatomical variability exhibited by major dinosaur groups living during the latest Cretaceous is published by Stephen L. Brusatte et al. (2012).
- A study of biodiversity of late Maastrichtian non-avian dinosaurs is published by Jean Le Loeuff (2012).

=== New taxa ===
Name	Novelty	Status	Authors	Age	Unit	Location	Notes	Images
Alnashetri	Gen. et sp. nov	Valid	Makovicky, Apesteguía & Gianechini	Late Cretaceous (Cenomanian or Turonian)	Candeleros Formation	Argentina	A coelurosaurian, a probable relative of alvarezsaurids. The type species is Alnashetri cerropoliciensis.	
Astrophocaudia	Gen. et sp. nov	Valid	D’Emic	Early Cretaceous	Trinity Group	United States (Texas)	A titanosauriform sauropod, a member of the clade Somphospondyli. The type species is Astrophocaudia slaughteri.	
Batyrosaurus	Gen. et sp. nov	Valid	Godefroit et al.	Late Cretaceous		Kazakhstan	A basal hadrosauroid. The type species is Batyrosaurus rozhdestvenskyi.	
Bicentenaria	Gen. et sp. nov	Valid	Novas et al.	Cenomanian	Candeleros Formation	Argentina	A coelurosaur. The type species is Bicentenaria argentina.	
Bonapartenykus	Gen. et sp. nov	Valid	Agnolin, Powell, Novas, & Kundrát	Campanian/Maastrichtian	Allen Formation	Argentina	An alvarezsaurid.	
Comahuesaurus	Gen. et sp. nov	Valid	Carballido et al.	Early Cretaceous (Aptian or Albian)	Lohan Cura Formation	Argentina	A rebbachisaurid sauropod. The type species is Comahuesaurus windhauseni.	
Coronosaurus	Gen. et comb. nov	Valid	Ryan, Evans & Shepherd	Late Cretaceous	Oldman Formation	Canada	A centrosaurine ceratopsian, a new genus for "Centrosaurus" brinkmani Ryan & Russell (2005).	
Darwinsaurus	Gen. et sp. nov	Valid	Paul	Early Cretaceous (early Valanginian)	Wadhurst Clay Formation	United Kingdom	A styracosternan ornithopod. The type species is Darwinsaurus evolutionis, and the holotype is an associated skeleton that includes material catalogued under numbers NHMUK R1831 (a dentary), R1833, R1835 and R1836; this skeleton is assigned by Norman (2010) to Hypselospinus fittoni.	
Elaltitan	Gen. et sp. nov	Valid	Mannion & Otero	Middle Cenomanian to Turonian	Bajo Barreal Formation	Argentina	A lithostrotian titanosaur. The type species is Elaltitan lilloi.	
Eoabelisaurus	Gen. et sp. nov	Valid	Pol & Rauhut	Aalenian or Bajocian	Cañadon Asfalto Formation	Argentina	An abelisaurid. The type species is Eoabelisaurus mefi.	
Gideonmantellia	Gen. et sp. nov	Valid	Ruiz-Omeñaca et al.	Barremian	Camarillas Formation	Spain	A basal ornithopod. The type species is Gideonmantellia amosanjuanae.	
Gryphoceratops	Gen. et sp. nov	Valid	Ryan, Evans, Currie, Brown, & Brinkman	Late Santonian	Milk River Formation	Canada	A leptoceratopsid ceratopsian.	
Hexing	Gen. et sp. nov	Valid	Jin, Chen & Godefroit	Early Valanginian to early Barremian	Yixian Formation	China	A basal ornithomimosaur. The type species is Hexing qingyi.	
Huehuecanauhtlus	Gen. et sp.	Valid	Ramírez-Velasco et al.	Santonian		Mexico	A basal hadrosauroid. The type species is Huehuecanauhtlus tiquichensis.	
Huxleysaurus	Gen. et com. nov	Valid	Paul	Early Cretaceous (early Valanginian)	Wadhurst Clay Formation	United Kingdom	A styracosternan ornithopod, a new genus for "Iguanodon" hollingtoniensis Lydekker (1889); this species is considered by Norman (2010) to be a junior synonym of Hypselospinus fittoni.	
Ichthyovenator	Gen. et sp. nov	Valid	Allain et al.	Late Early Cretaceous	Savannakhet Basin	Laos	A spinosaurid. The type species is Ichthyovenator laosensis.	
Kaatedocus	Gen. et sp. nov	Valid	Tschopp & Mateus	Late Jurassic (Kimmeridgian)	Morrison Formation	United States	A diplodocine diplodocid sauropod. The type species is Kaatedocus siberi.	
Kundurosaurus	Gen. et sp. nov	Valid	Godefroit, Bolotsky & Lauters	Late Cretaceous, possibly late Maastrichtian	Udurchukan Formation	Russia	A saurolophine hadrosaurid. The type species is Kundurosaurus nagornyi.	
Lapampasaurus	Gen. et sp. nov	Valid	Coria, Riga & Casadío	Late Cretaceous (late Campanian or early Maastrichthian)	Allen Formation	Argentina	A hadrosaurid. The type species is Lapampasaurus cholinoi.	
Latirhinus	Gen. et sp. nov	Valid	Prieto-Márquez & Brañas	Late Cretaceous (late Campanian)	Cerro del Pueblo Formation	Mexico	A hadrosaurid of uncertain phylogenetic placement; originally described as a saurolophine, but subsequently reinterpreted as a lambeosaurine. The type species is Latirhinus uitstlani.	
Magnapaulia	Gen. et comb. nov	Valid	Prieto-Márquez, Chiappe & Joshi	Late Campanian	El Gallo Formation	Mexico	A lambeosaurine hadrosaurid, a new genus for "Lambeosaurus" laticaudus (Morris, 1981).	
Mantellodon	Gen. et sp. nov	Valid	Paul	Early Cretaceous (early Aptian)	Lower Greensand Formation	United Kingdom	A styracosternan ornithopod. The type species is Mantellodon carpenteri and the holotype is the specimen NHMUK R3741 consisting of partial associated skeleton (also known as Gideon Mantell's "Mantel-piece")	
Martharaptor	Gen. et sp. nov	Valid	Senter, Kirkland & DeBlieux	Early Aptian	Cedar Mountain Formation	United States	A possible therizinosauroid. The type species is Martharaptor greenriverensis.	
Microraptor hanqingi	sp nov	Valid	Gong et al.	Early Cretaceous		China	A species of Microraptor. Its status as a distinct species is disputed, with Pei et al. (2014) considering the holotype specimen's morphology not to be distinguishable from other Microraptor specimens.	
Mochlodon vorosi	Sp. nov	Junior synonym	Ősi et al.	Santonian	Csehbánya Formation	Hungary	Originally described as a rhabdodontid ornithopod and a species of Mochlodon; subsequently reinterpreted as a ceratopsian and a junior synonym of Ajkaceratops kozmai.	
Ningyuansaurus	Gen. et sp. nov	Valid	Ji et al.	Early Cretaceous	Yixian Formation	China	An oviraptorosaur. The type species is Ningyuansaurus wangi.	
Ostafrikasaurus	Gen. et sp. nov	Valid	Buffetaut	Late Jurassic	Tendaguru Formation	Tanzania	A spinosaurid. The type species is Ostafrikasaurus crassiserratus.	
Pachyrhinosaurus perotorum	sp nov	Valid	Fiorillo & Tykoski	Maastrichtian	Prince Creek Formation	USA	Third known species of Pachyrhinosaurus.	
Pegomastax	Gen. et sp. nov	Valid	Sereno	Hettangian to Sinemurian	Elliot Formation	South Africa	A heterodontosaurid. The type species is Pegomastax africana.	
Philovenator	Gen. et sp. nov	Valid	Xu et al.	Campanian	Wulansuhai Formation	China	A troodontid. Its type species is Philovenator curriei.	
Proa	Gen. et sp. nov	Valid	McDonald et al.	Early Cretaceous (early Albian)	Escucha Formation	Spain	An iguanodont ornithopod closely related to Iguanodon and the clade Hadrosauroidea. The type species is Proa valdearinnoensis.	
Rugocaudia	Gen. et sp. nov	Valid	Woodruff	Aptian or Albian	Cloverly Formation	USA	A titanosauriform sauropod. The type species is Rugocaudia cooneyi.	
Sauroniops	Gen. et sp. nov	Valid	Cau, Dalla Vecchia & Fabbri	Cenomanian	Kem Kem Beds	Morocco	A carcharodontosaurid. The type species is Sauroniops pachytholus. Announced in 2012; the final version of the article naming it was published in 2013.	
Sciurumimus	Gen. et sp. nov	Valid	Rauhut et al.	Upper Kimmeridgian		Germany	A megalosauroid. The type species is Sciurumimus albersdoerferi.	
Unescoceratops	Gen. et sp. nov	Valid	Ryan, Evans, Currie, Brown, & Brinkman	Late Campanian	Dinosaur Park Formation	Canada	A leptoceratopsid ceratopsian.	
Xenoceratops	Gen. et sp. nov	Valid	Ryan, Evans & Shepherd	Late Cretaceous (middle Campanian)	Foremost Formation	Canada	A centrosaurine ceratopsian. The type species is Xenoceratops foremostensis.	
Yueosaurus	Gen. et sp. nov	Valid	Zheng, Jin, Shibata, Azuma, & Yu	Aptian-Cenomanian	Liangtoutang Formation	China	A basal ornithopod.	
Yurgovuchia	Gen. et sp. nov	Valid	Senter et al.	Early Cretaceous, possibly Barremian	Cedar Mountain Formation	USA	A dromaeosaurid. The type species is Yurgovuchia doellingi.	
Yutyrannus	Gen. et sp. nov	Valid	Xu et al.	Early Cretaceous	Yixian Formation	China	A basal tyrannosauroid. The type species is Yutyrannus huali.	

== Newly named birds ==
Name	Novelty	Status	Authors	Age	Unit	Location	Notes	Images
Aegolius gradyi	Sp. nov.	Valid	Storrs L. Olson	Pleistocene to Holocene		Bermuda	A Strigidae.	
Aegypius jinniushanensis	Sp. nov.	Valid	Zhang Zihui Huang Yunping Helen F. James Hou Lianhai	Middle Pleistocene		China	An Accipitridae.	
Aix praeclara	Sp. nov.	Valid	Nikita V. Zelenkov Evgeny N. Kurochkin	Middle Miocene	Oshin Formation	Mongolia	An Anatidae.	
Alauda xerarvensis	Sp. nov.	Valid	Zlatozar Boev	Late Pliocene	Middle Villafranchian	Bulgaria	An Alaudidae.	
Anchigyps voorhiesi	Gen. nov. et Sp. nov.	Valid	Zhang Zihui Alan Feduccia Helen F. James	Late Miocene. late Clarendonian	Ash Hollow Formation	USA: Nebraska	An Accipitridae close in morphology to the Old World Vultures. The type species of the new genus.	
Anhinga walterbolesi	Sp. nov.	Valid	Trevor H. Worthy	Late Oligocene or Early Miocene	Etadunna Formation, 24-26 Ma	Australia: South Australia	An Anhingidae.	
Anthus antecedens	Sp. nov.	Valid	Jenö Kessler János Hír	Middle Miocene	MN 7-8	Hungary	A Motacillidae.	
Athene vallgornerensis	Sp. nov.	Valid	Carmen Guerra Pere Bover Josep A. Alcover	Early Pleistocene	Cave deposits	Spain: Majorca	A Strigidae.	
Australopicus nelsonmandelai	Gen. nov. et Sp. nov.	Valid	Albrecht Manegold Antoine Louchart	Early Pliocene	Varswater Formation	South Africa	A Picidae, this is the type species of the new genus.	
Avolatavis tenens	Gen. nov. et Sp. nov.	Valid	Daniel T. Ksepka Julia A. Clarke	Eocene	Green River Formation	USA: Wyoming	A stem parrot, a member of Pan-Psittaciformes. The type species of the new genus.	
Becassius charadriioides	Gen. nov. et Sp. nov.	Valid	Vanesa L. De Pietri Gerald Mayr	Early Miocene	Saint-Gérard-le-Puy, MN 2a	France	Originally described as a member of the family Scolopacidae or a relative of the Scolopacidae; De Pietri, Mayr & Scofield (2019) transferred this species to the family Glareolidae. The type species of the new genus.	
Bombycilla hamori	Sp. nov.	Valid	Jenö Kessler János Hír	Early Miocene	MN 5	Hungary	A Bombycillidae.	
Brodavis americanus	Gen. nov. et Sp. nov.	Valid	Larry D. Martin Evgeny N. Kurochkin Tim T. Tokaryk	Late Cretaceous,	Maastrichtian Frenchman Formation	Canada: Saskatchewan	A Hesperornithiformes Fürbringer, 1888, Brodavidae Martin, Kurochkin et Tokaryk, 2012, this is the type species of the new genus.	
Brodavis baileyi	Sp. nov.	Valid	Larry D. Martin Evgeny N. Kurochkin Tim T. Tokaryk	Late Cretaceous,	Maastrichtian Hell Creek Formation	USA: South Dakota	A Hesperornithiformes Fürbringer, 1888, Brodavidae Martin, Kurochkin et Tokaryk, 2012.	
Brodavis mongoliensis	Sp. nov.	Valid	Larry D. Martin Evgeny N. Kurochkin Tim T. Tokaryk	Late Cretaceous,	Maastrichtian Nemegt Formation	Mongolia	A Hesperornithiformes Fürbringer, 1888, Brodavidae Martin, Kurochkin et Tokaryk, 2012.	
Certhia janossyi	Sp. nov.	Valid	Jenö Kessler János Hír	Late Miocene	MN 9	Hungary	Originally described as a species of Certhia; Zelenkov (2017) transferred this species to a new genus Sylvosimadaravis within the superfamily Sylvioidea.	
Chenoanas deserta	Gen. nov. et Sp. nov.	Valid	Nikita V. Zelenkov	Middle Miocene	Oshin Formation	Mongolia	An Anatidae, this is the type species of the new genus.	
Cinclus major	Sp. nov.	Valid	Jenö Kessler János Hír	Early Miocene	MN 5	Hungary	A Cinclidae.	
Circaetus rhodopensis	Sp. nov.	Valid	Zlatozar Boev	Late Miocene	Tulorian = Late Meotian, Late MN 11, ca. 7,5 Mya	Bulgaria	An Accipitridae.	
Crypturellus reai	Sp. nov.	Valid	Robert M. Chandler	Miocene (Santacrucian)	Santa Cruz Formation	Argentina	A Tinamidae.	
?Elorius limosoides	Sp. nov.	Valid	Vanessa L. De Pietri Gerald Mayr	Early Miocene	Saint-Gérard-le-Puy, MN 2a	France	A Scolopacidae, possibly a species of Elorius.	
Emberiza bartkoi	Sp. nov.	Valid	Jenö Kessler János Hír	Early Miocene	MN 5	Hungary	An Emberizidae.	
Eremarida xerophila	Gen. nov. et Sp. nov.	Valid	Zlatozar Boev	Late Miocene	Gnilyane Formation	Bulgaria	An Alaudidae, this is the type species of the new genus.	
Eremophila prealpestris	Sp. nov.	Valid	Zlatozar Boev	Late Pliocene	Middle Villafranchian, MP 17, 2,23-2,40 Mya	Bulgaria	An Alaudidae.	
Erithacus horusitzkyi	Sp. nov.	Valid	Jenö Kessler János Hír	Middle Miocene	MN 7/8	Hungary	A Muscicapidae, an Erithacus robin.	
Galerida bulgarica	Sp. nov.	Valid	Zlatozar Boev	Late Pliocene	Middle Villafranchian	Bulgaria	An Alaudidae.	
Galerida cserhatensis	Sp. nov.	Valid	Jenö Kessler János Hír	Early Miocene	MN 5	Hungary	An Alaudidae.	
Heteroanser vicinus	Gen. nov. et Comb. nov.	Valid	Nikita V. Zelenkov	Late Miocene	Hyargas Nuur Formation	Mongolia	An Anatidae a new genus for "Heterochen" vicinus Kurochkin, 1976.	
Hirundo selengenica	Sp. nov.	Valid	Nikita V. Zelenkov Evgeny N. Kurochkin	Late Pliocene	Chikoi Formation	Mongolia	A Hirundinidae.	
Jeholornis palmapenis	Sp. nov.	Valid	Jingmai K. O'Connor Sun Chengkai Xu Xing Wang Xiaolin Zhou Zhonghe	Early Aptian	Jiufotang Formation	China	A Jeholornithidae Zhou et Zhang, 2006.	
Kairuku grebneffi	Sp. nov.	Valid	Daniel T. Ksepka R. Ewan Fordyce Tatsuro Ando Craig M. Jones	Oligocene	Dutroonian	New Zealand	A Spheniscidae.	
Kairuku waitaki	Gen. nov. et Sp. nov	Valid	Daniel T. Ksepka R. Ewan Fordyce Tatsuro Ando Craig M. Jones	Oligocene	Late Whaingaroan or Early Duntroonian	New Zealand	A Spheniscidae, the type species of the genus.	
Lanius schreteri	Sp. nov.	Valid	Jenö Kessler János Hír	Middle Miocene	MN 7-8	Hungary	A Laniidae.	
Leptoptilos lüi	Sp. nov.	Not valid	Zhang Zihui Huang Yunping Helen F. James Hou Lianhai	Middle Pleistocene	Cave deposits	China	A Ciconiidae, the name is not valid because of the "ü" in it, that must, of course be a plain "u".	
Lullula balcanica	Sp. nov.	Valid	Zlatozar Boev	Late Pliocene	Middle Villafranchian	Bulgaria	An Alaudidae.	
Lullula neogradensis	Sp. nov.	Valid	Jenö Kessler János Hír	Middle Miocene	MN 7/8	Hungary	An Alaudidae.	
Lullula slivnicensis	Sp. nov.	Valid	Zlatozar Boev	Late Pliocene	Early Late Villafranchian, MN 18	Bulgaria	An Alaudidae, a relative of the woodlark.	
Luscinia praeluscinia	Sp. nov.	Valid	Jenö Kessler János Hír	Early Miocene	MN 5	Hungary	A Muscicapidae.	
Lutetodontopteryx tethyensis	Gen. nov. et Sp. nov.	Valid	Gerald Mayr Evgenij Zvonok	Middle Eocene	Early Lutetian	Ukraine	A Pelagornithidae, this is the type species of the new genus.	
Melanocorypha donchevi	Sp. nov.	Valid	Zlatozar Boev	Late Pliocene	Middle Villafranchian	Bulgaria	An Alaudidae.	
Melanocorypha serdicensis	Sp. nov.	Valid	Zlatozar Boev	Late Miocene	Gnilyane Formation, Middle Late Pontian	Bulgaria	An Alaudidae.	
Mioquerquedula minutissima	Gen. nov. et Sp. nov.	Valid	Nikita V. Zelenkov Evgeny N. Kurochkin	Middle Miocene, possibly also Late Miocene	Gobi-Altai Aimag, Shargyn Govi, Sharga location	Mongolia	An Anatidae, this is the type species of the new genus, the new genus also contains "Anas" velox Milne-Edwards, 1868 as a Comb. nov. from France, Germany, Romania and ?Hungary.	
Muscicapa leganyii	Sp. nov.	Valid	Jenö Kessler János Hír	Middle Miocene	MN 7/8	Hungary	A Muscicapidae.	
Otus mauli	Sp. nov.	Valid	Carlos Rando Harald Pieper Josep A. Alcover Storrs L. Olson	Quaternary		Portugal: Madeira	A Strigidae.	
?Parvelorius calidris	Gen. nov. et Sp. nov.	Valid	Vanessa L. De Pietri Gerald Mayr	Early Miocene	MN 2a	France	A Scolopacidae, the new genus is erected for the species "Tringa" gracilis Milne-Edwards, 1868, the type species of the new genus and makes a Com. nov. with it; genus may also contain this new species.	
Phylloscopus miocaenicus	Sp. nov.	Valid	Jenö Kessler János Hír	Middle Miocene	MN 6-8	Hungary	A Phylloscopidae.	
Picavus litencicensis	Gen. nov. et Sp. nov.	Valid	Gerald Mayr Růžena Gregorová	Early Oligocene	Menilite Formation	Czech Republic	A stem group representative of the Piciformes, placed in a new family Picavidae Mayr et Gregorová, 2012. it is the type species of the new genus.	
Pipilo naufragus	Sp. nov.	Valid	Storrs L. Olson David B. Wingate	Middle Pleistocene to Holocene	Cave deposits	Bermuda	A Passerellidae, towhee.	
Pliocalcarius orkhonensis	Gen. nov. et Sp. nov	Valid	Nikita V. Zelenkov Evgeny N. Kurochkin	Late Pliocene	Villafranchian, Chikoi Formation, MN 16a	Mongolia	Initially considered to be a likely close relative of longspurs, Calcariidae, and made the type species of the new genus Pliocalcarius; Palastrova & Zelenkov (2020) reinterpreted this species as a lark and transferred it to the genus Eremophila.	
Praealauda hevesensis	Gen. nov. et Sp. nov.	Valid	Jenö Kessler János Hír	Middle Miocene	MN 7/8	Hungary	An Alaudidae. The type species of the new genus.	
Primophaps schoddei	Gen. nov. et Sp. nov.	Valid	Trevor H. Worthy	Late Oligocene to early Miocene	Riversleigh	Australia Queensland	A Columbidae related to the bronzewing pigeons. The type species of the new genus.	
Pterocnemia mesopotamica	Sp. nov.	Valid	Federico L. Agnolín Jorge I. Noriega	Late Miocene	Ituzaingó Formation, Huayquerian	Argentina	A Rheidae. Transferred to the genus Rhea by Tambussi, Degrange & De Mendoza (2023).	
Rallicrex litkensis	Sp. nov.	Valid	Jenö Kessler János Hír	Early Miocene	MN 5	Hungary	A Rallidae, a new species of Rallicrex Lambrecht, 1933, the type species is Rallicrex kolozsvarensis Lambrecht, 1933.	
Rhodospiza shaamarica	Sp. nov.	Valid	Nikita V. Zelenkov Evgeny N. Kurochkin	Late Pliocene	Villafranchian, Chikoi Formation, MN 16a	Mongolia; Russia	Originally described as a species of Rhodospiza; Palastrova & Zelenkov (2020) transferred it to the genus Emberiza.	
Sanshuiornis zhangi	Gen. nov. et Sp. nov.	Valid	Wang Min Gerald Mayr Zhang Jiangyong Zhou Zhonghe	Middle Eocene	Huayong Formation	China	A Ciconiiformes Incertae Sedis.	
Schizooura lii	Gen. nov. et Sp. nov	Valid	Zhou Shuang Zhou Zhonghe Jingmai K. O'Connor	Aptian	Jiufotang Formation	China	A basal Ornithuromorpha. The type species of the new genus.	
Scolopacimilis lartetianus	Gen. nov. et Comb. nov.	Valid	Vanessa L. De Pietri Mayr	Early Miocene	MN 2a	France	A Scolopacidae, a new genus for the species "Totanus" lartetianus, the type species of the genus, creating a Comb. nov.	
Shengjingornis yangi	Gen. nov et Sp. nov.	Valid	Li Li Wang Jinqi Zhang Xi Hou Shilin	Early Cretaceous	Jiufotang Formation	China	A Longipterygidae Zhang, Zhou, Hou L. H. et Gu, 2000, Enantiornithes Walker, 1981. The type species of the new genus.	
Songzia acutunguis	Sp. nov.	Valid	Wang Min Gerald Mayr Zhang Jiangyong Zhou Zhonghe	Early Eocene	Yangxi Formation	China	A Songziidae Hou, 1990, Gruiformes. The type species is Songzia heidangkouensis Hou, 1990.	
Sturnus kretzoii	Sp. nov.	Valid	Jenö Kessler János Hír	Late Miocene	MN 9	Hungary	A Sturnidae.	
Tadorna minor	Sp. nov.	Valid	Jenö Kessler János Hír	Miocene	MN 7/8	Hungary	An Anatidae.	
Turdicus minor	Sp. nov.	Valid	Jenö Kessler János Hír	Early to Middle Miocene		Hungary	A Turdidae.	
Tydea septentrionalis	Gen. nov. et Sp. nov.	Valid	Gerald Mayr Thierry Smith	Early Oligocene	Rupelian	Belgium: Antwerp	A Diomedeidae. The type species of the new genus.	
Xiangornis shenmi	Gen. nov. et Sp. nov.	Valid	Hu Dongyu Xu Xing Hou Lianhai Corwin Sullivan	Early Cretaceous	Jiufotang Formation	China	An Enantiornithes Walker, 1981. The type species of the new genus.	

== Pterosaurs ==
=== Research ===
- A study on the bone histology of Rhamphorhynchus and its implications for inferring life history of members of the genus is published by Prondvai et al. (2012).

=== New taxa ===
Name	Novelty	Status	Authors	Age	Unit	Location	Notes	Images
Aerotitan	Gen. et sp. nov	Valid	Novas et al.	Late Cretaceous		Argentina	An azhdarchid. The type species is Aerotitan sudamericanus.	
Bellubrunnus	Gen. et sp. nov	Valid	Hone et al.	Late Kimmeridgian	Pfraundorf-Heitzenhofen Basin	Germany	A rhamphorhynchid. The type species is Bellubrunnus rothgaengeri.	
Dendrorhynchoides mutoudengensis	Sp. nov	Valid	Lü & Hone	Middle Jurassic	Tiaojishan Formation	China	An anurognathid. Originally described as a species of Dendrorhynchoides, but subsequently transferred to the separate genus Luopterus.	
Europejara	Gen. et sp. nov	Valid	Vullo et al.	Upper Barremian	La Huérguina Formation	Spain	A tapejarid. The type species is Europejara olcadesorum.	
Gladocephaloideus	Gen. et sp. nov	Valid	Lü, Ji, Wei, & Liu	Barremian	Yixian Formation	China	A ctenochasmatid ctenochasmatoid.	
Guidraco	Gen. et sp. nov	Valid	Wang, Kellner, Jiang, & Cheng	Early Cretaceous	Jiufotang Formation	China	A close relative of Ludodactylus. The type species is Guidraco venator.	
Jianchangnathus	Gen. et sp. nov	Valid	Cheng, Wang, Jiang, & Kellner	Middle Jurassic	Tiaojishan Formation	China	A scaphognathid.	
Moganopterus	Gen. et sp. nov	Valid	Lü et al.	Early Cretaceous	Yixian Formation	China	A boreopterid. The type species is Moganopterus zhuiana.	
Qinglongopterus	Gen. et sp.	Valid	Lü, Unwin, Zhao, Gao & Shen.	Middle Jurassic	Tiaojishan Formation	China	A rhamphorhynchid.	

== Archosauria incertae sedis ==
=== Newly named archosaurs with uncertain affinities ===
Name	Novelty	Status	Authors	Age	Unit	Location	Notes	Images
Samrukia	Gen. et sp. nov	Valid	Naish, Dyke, Cau, Escuillié, Godefroit	Late Cretaceous	Kyzylorda District	Kazakhstan	A possible basal ornithuromorph; alternatively, it could be a large pterosaur.	
Smok	Gen. et sp. nov	Valid	Niedźwiedzki, Sulej & Dzik	Latest Norian/Early Rhaetian	Lipie Śląskie clay-pit	Poland	A large predatory archosaur of uncertain phylogenetic placement, the largest known predatory archosaur from the Late Triassic and Early Jurassic of central Europe.	
