= Patev =

Patev is a surname. Notable people with the surname include:

- Pavel Patev (1889–1950), Bulgarian zoologist
- Petar Patev (born 1993), Bulgarian footballer
