= Nikolay Boev =

Nikolay Krumov Boev (8 May 1922 - 12 November 1985) was a Bulgarian zoologist who worked at the National Museum of Natural History (Bulgaria) at Sofia. He specialized in ornithology, but also worked on mammals and was a pioneer of wildlife conservation in Bulgaria. He has been considered the father of modern ornithology and conservation in Bulgaria.

Boev was born in Aytos, Bourgas District to Krum, a book merchant and Zlatka Georgieva, a teacher of French and Russian. He went to the local schools and took an interest in animals at a young age. He took a special interest in birds and his first publication was Cursed Birds published in the Bulgarian journal Nature in 1941. He joined the army and served for 3 years in Shumen, collecting fossils at the same time. He also spent time in the National Museum of Natural History in Sofia where he met Boris III of Bulgaria, a keen ornithologist. He was also in touch with Italian ornithologist Edgardo Moltoni and after the war he joined Sofia University where he worked with Pavel Patev of the Sofia Zoo. From 1944 he worked on reorganizing the ornithological collections at the Museum along with Ivan Buresh and Pavel Patev. In 1947 graduated from the Faculty of Physics and Mathematics and was appointed as laboratory technician. In 1950 he worked in the zoo and returned to the Zoological Institute of the Bulgarian Academy of Sciences.

He was a keen popularizer and writer on natural history topics, appearing on television shows and illustrating books on his own. He researched folks names of birds in Bulgarian and also took an interest in conservation. In 1951 he was the Secretary for the Union for the Protection of Nature under Kiril Rizov. He helped in the translation into Bulgarian and publication of many works by foreign authors such as Tinbergen, Rachel Carson, Jane Goodall, Gerald Durrell and others whom he knew personally. He published Red Book of the Republic of Bulgaria in two volumes. His son Zlatozar Boev also became an ornithologist.
