= Affalterbach, Pfaffenhofen an der Ilm =

Village in Bavaria, Germany

Coordinates: 48°33′50″N 11°31′51″E

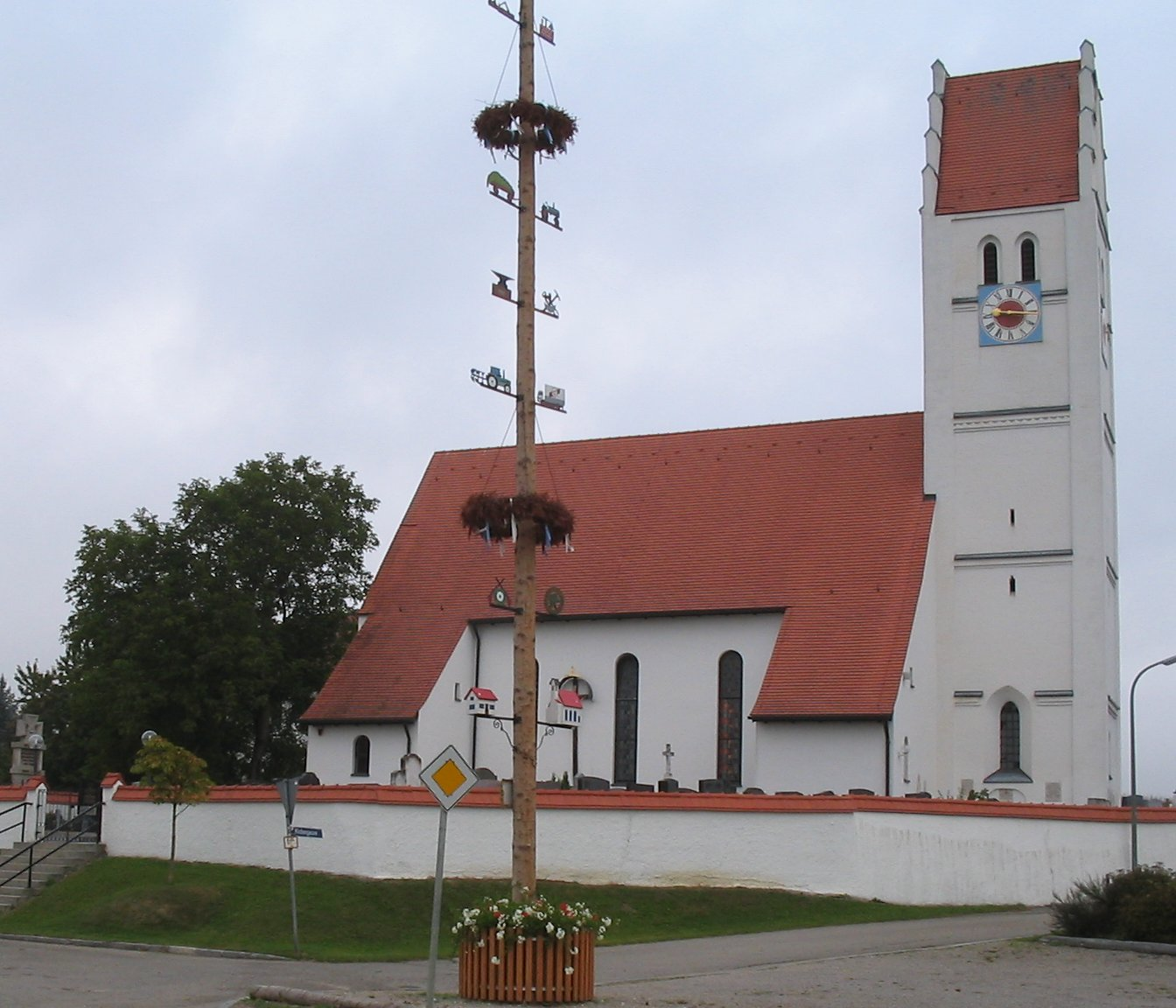
St. Michael

Affalterbach is a village (Ortsteil) of the Bavarian municipality of Pfaffenhofen an der Ilm. There is a fossil site about 800 m northwest of the church; the site has been dated to about 16 million years ago (MN 5) on the basis of the presence of the small rodent Megacricetodon aff. bavaricus and the local stratigraphy. The site also contains the dormice Miodyromys aff. aegercii, Glirulus diremptus, Microdyromys cf. complicatus, Prodryomys satus, cf. Bransatoglis sp., Muscardinus cf. sansaniensis, and Seorsumuscardinus bolligeri.

== Literature cited ==
- Prieto, J. and Böhme, M. 2007. Heissigia bolligeri gen. et sp. nov.: a new enigmatic dormouse (Gliridae, Rodentia) from the Miocene of the Northern Alpine Foreland Basin (subscription required). Neues Jahrbuch für Geologie und Paläontologie, Abhandlungen 245(3):301–307.
