= Falco bulgaricus =

Falco bulgaricus Temporal range: Late Miocene

Scientific classification
- Kingdom: Animalia
- Phylum: Chordata
- Class: Aves
- Order: Falconiformes
- Family: Falconidae
- Genus: Falco
- Species: †F. bulgaricus

Binomial name
- †Falco bulgaricus Boev, 2011

Extinct species of bird

Falco bulgaricus is an extinct species of Falco that lived during the Late Miocene.

== Distribution ==
Falco bulgaricus is known from Hadzhidimovo in southwestern Bulgaria.
