= Porzana botunensis =

Porzana botunensis Temporal range: Early Pleistocene

Scientific classification
- Kingdom: Animalia
- Phylum: Chordata
- Class: Aves
- Order: Gruiformes
- Family: Rallidae
- Genus: Porzana
- Species: †P. botunensis

Binomial name
- †Porzana botunensis Boev, 2015

Extinct species of Porzana

Porzana botunensis is an extinct species of Porzana that lived during the Early Pleistocene.

== Distribution ==
Porzana botunensis is known from Bulgaria.
