= Aquila kurochkini =

Aquila kurochkini Temporal range: Gelasian

Scientific classification
- Kingdom: Animalia
- Phylum: Chordata
- Class: Aves
- Order: Accipitriformes
- Family: Accipitridae
- Genus: Aquila
- Species: †A. kurochkini

Binomial name
- †Aquila kurochkini Boev, 2013

Extinct species of eagle

Aquila kurochkini is an extinct species of Aquila that lived during the Gelasian stage of the Pleistocene epoch.

== Distribution ==
Fossils of A. kurochkini are known from the site of Varshets in northwestern Bulgaria, dating to around 2.40-2.23 Ma.
