= Circaetus rhodopensis =

Circaetus rhodopensis Temporal range: Late Miocene

Scientific classification
- Kingdom: Animalia
- Phylum: Chordata
- Class: Aves
- Order: Accipitriformes
- Family: Accipitridae
- Genus: Circaetus
- Species: †C. rhodopensis

Binomial name
- †Circaetus rhodopensis Boev, 2012

Extinct species of bird

Circaetus rhodopensis is an extinct species of Circaetus that lived in Bulgaria during the Late Miocene.
