= Alauda xerarvensis =

Alauda xerarvensis Temporal range: Piacenzian

Scientific classification
- Kingdom: Animalia
- Phylum: Chordata
- Class: Aves
- Order: Passeriformes
- Family: Alaudidae
- Genus: Alauda
- Species: †A. xerarvensis

Binomial name
- †Alauda xerarvensis Boev, 2012

Extinct species of bird

Alauda xerarvensis is an extinct species of lark in the genus Alauda that inhabited Bulgaria during the Late Pliocene.
