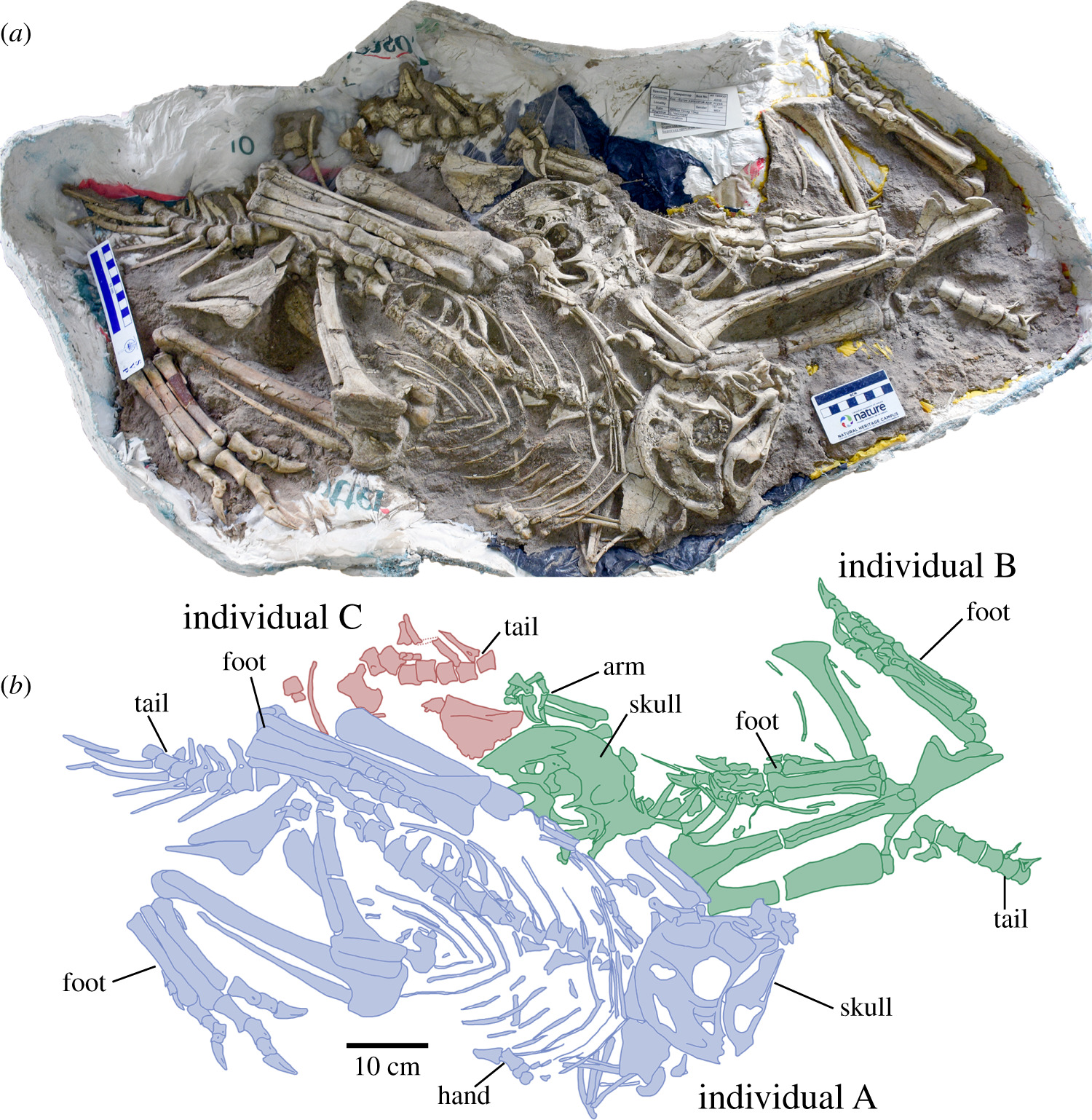
- Holotype block assemblage (top) and line drawing (bottom)

Scientific classification
- Kingdom: Animalia
- Phylum: Chordata
- Class: Reptilia
- Clade: Dinosauria
- Clade: Saurischia
- Clade: Theropoda
- Family: †Oviraptoridae
- Subfamily: †Heyuanninae
- Genus: †Oksoko; Funston et al., 2020

Type species
- †Oksoko avarsan Funston et al., 2020

= Oksoko avarsan =

Oksoko Temporal range: Late Cretaceous, Maastrichtian

Extinct species of dinosaur

Oksoko (Oak-soak-oh; from Öksökö, a mythical bird of Yakut folklore) is a genus of oviraptorid dinosaur from the Late Cretaceous of Asia, that lived in what is now the Nemegt Formation in Mongolia. It includes the type species Oksoko avarsan.

== History of discovery ==
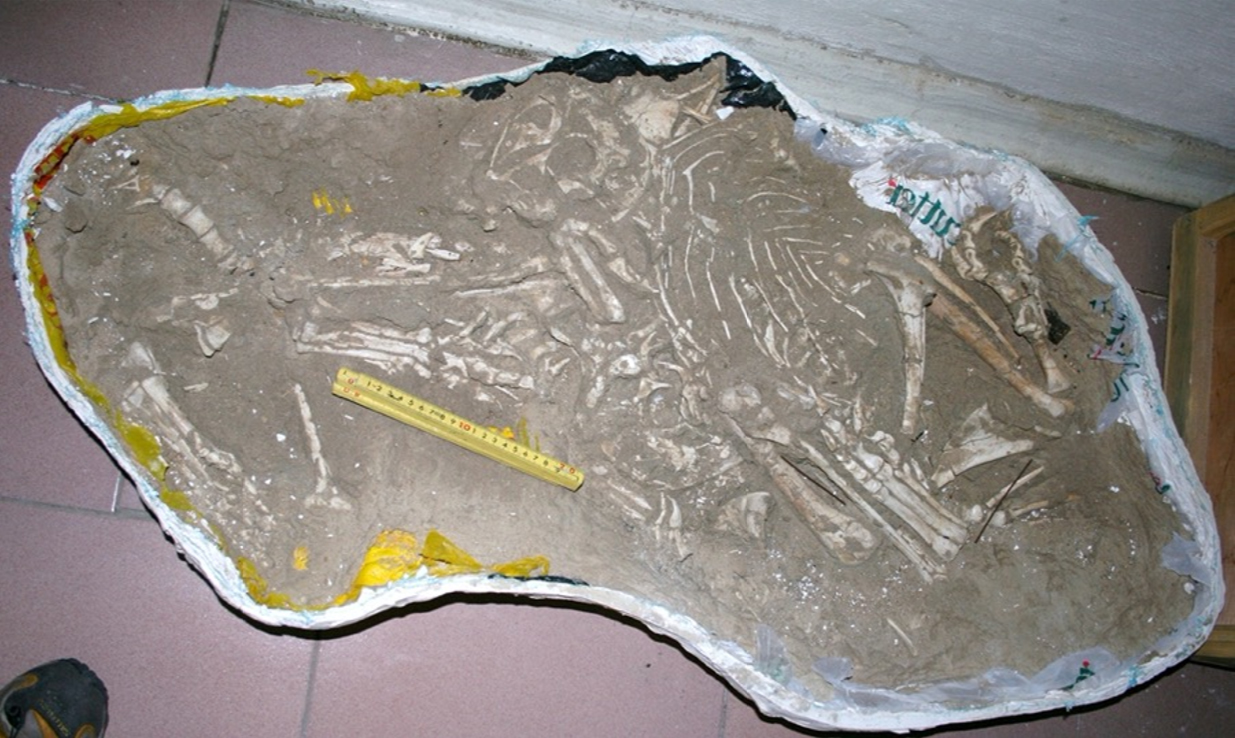
Holotype block assemblage prior to fossil preparation

The first specimen of Oksoko, MPC-D 100/33, was discovered in 1974 by the Soviet-Mongolian Palaeontological Expedition at the Bügiin Tsav locality in the Nemegt Formation of Mongolia. It is represented by a partial subadult postcranial skeleton. Although MPC-D 100/33 has been largely referred as a paratype of Heyuannia, this specimen shares several traits with other specimens of Oksoko including a reduced third metacarpal. The holotype specimen is a block of an assemblage of three individuals buried in life positions that has been labelled as MPC-D 102/110.

The first individual, subcatalogued as MPC-D 102/110a, is a partial skeleton of a juvenile preserving the skull, cervical vertebrae, pelvis, hindlimbs, and caudal vertebrae. Another specimen in this block is represented by MPC-D 102/110b, a large quadrate and quadratojugal. The third specimen in this assemblage is MPC-D 102/110c, a juvenile postcranial skeleton. Both specimens share taphonomical traits, such as the death pose, sediments and preservation state, which may suggest that MPC-D 102/11 is part of the holotype block assemblage.

Another, isolated specimen was collected in 1998 at the Guriliin Tsav locality by a joint expedition from the Hayashibara Museum of Natural Sciences and the Mongolian Palaeontological Centre. It was catalogued as MPC-D 102/12 and represents postcranial skeleton of an adult individual.

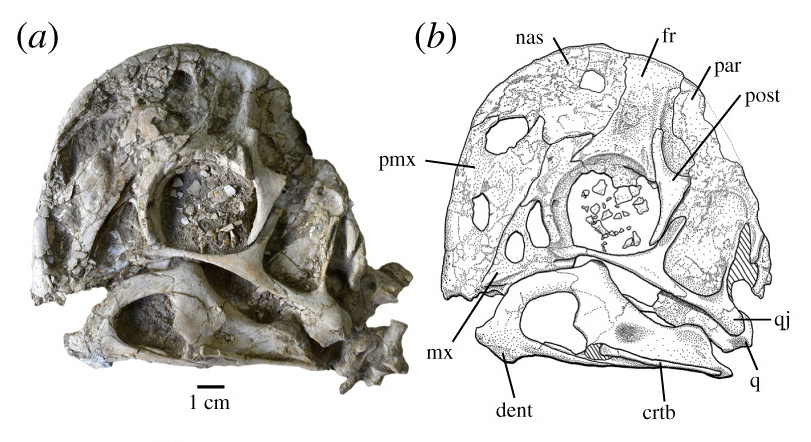
Skull of holotype MPC-D 102/110a

In 2006 this block was confiscated from poachers by the General Intelligence Agency of Mongolia along with a fourth specimen, MPC-D 102/11, representing a partial juvenile skeleton preserving the skull. They were later returned to the Mongolian Palaeontological Center on December 14 during the same year, where they were posteriorly prepared by professionals. Though the exact localities of these specimens are currently unknown due to their theft, although the colour of their sediments and geochemical analyses confirm their provenance from the Nemegt Formation.

To date, Oksoko is unequivocally known from at least two localities of the Nemegt Formation: Bügiin Tsav and Guriliin Tsav. All of these four specimens comprise at least six individuals. They were later assigned to the new genus and type species Oksoko avarsan, named in 2020 by the paleontologists Gregory F. Funston, Tsogtbaatar Chinzorig, Khishigjav Tsogtbaatar, Yoshitsugu Kobayashi, Corwin Sullivan and Philip J. Currie. The generic name, Oksoko, is derived from Öksökö, one of the multiple triple-headed eagles in the Altaic mythologies, in reference to the holotypic block assemblage preserving three skulls. The specific name, O. avarsan, is taken from the Mongolian word аварсан (avarsan, meaning rescued) given that specimens of the genus were redeemed from fossil poachers.

== Description ==
Size comparison with a human

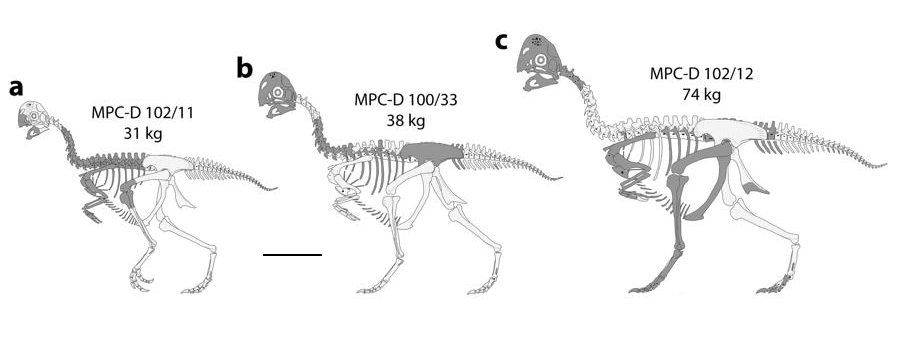
Body size of three specimens

The holotype is a nearly complete juvenile skeleton intertwined with three other individuals. Notably, three skulls and a good amount of arm material are known. The known hand has only two functional fingers, with the third being significantly reduced. However, the retention of the single vestigial phalanx on the third vestigial digit of Oksoko is an unusual feature unknown among any other theropods with functionally didactyl manus. Although a similar condition is known in the manus of the paravian theropod Balaur, the functional digits of Balaur are long and well-adapted for grasping compared to those of Oksoko which likely had limited range of motion. The forelimb reduction and third digit loss in Oksoko is independently developed among oviraptorosaurs, resulting from different evolutionary processes.

The juvenile specimens of Oksoko including the holotype are at least 1 year old with an estimated body mass of 31–45 kg (68–99 lb), while the only known adult specimen (MPC-D 102/12) is at least 5 years old with an estimated body mass of 74 kg (163 lb). The changes in overall morphology between juveniles and adults of Oksoko are relatively minimal, though the limb bones become more robust in adults. The head crest is already well-developed in juveniles, indicating that its primary role was not for sexual display, but more likely used for possible vocalization based on the connection between the nasal passages and pneumatic sinuses.

== Classification ==
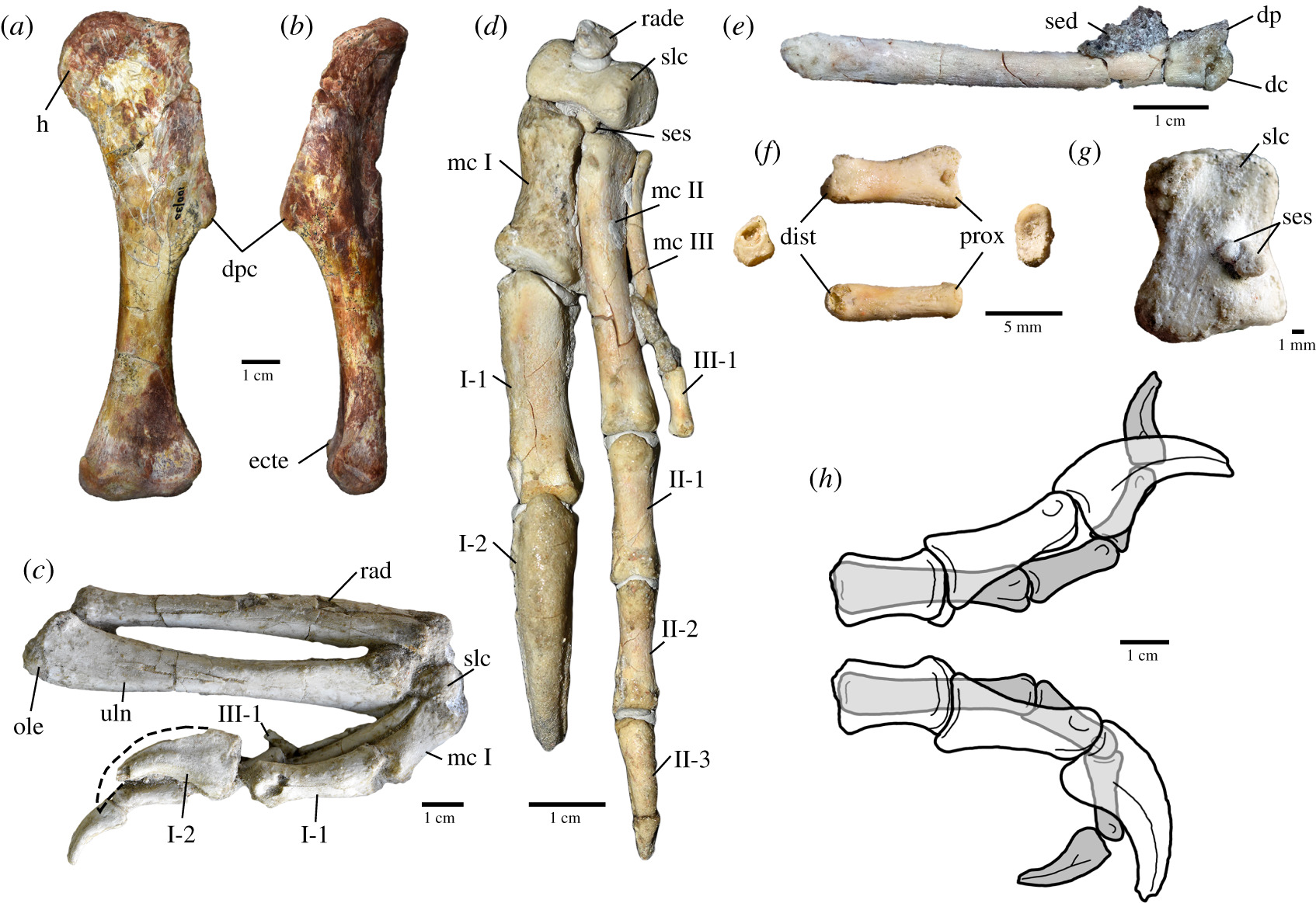
Forelimb bones of Oksoko, showing the two-fingered hand in (d)

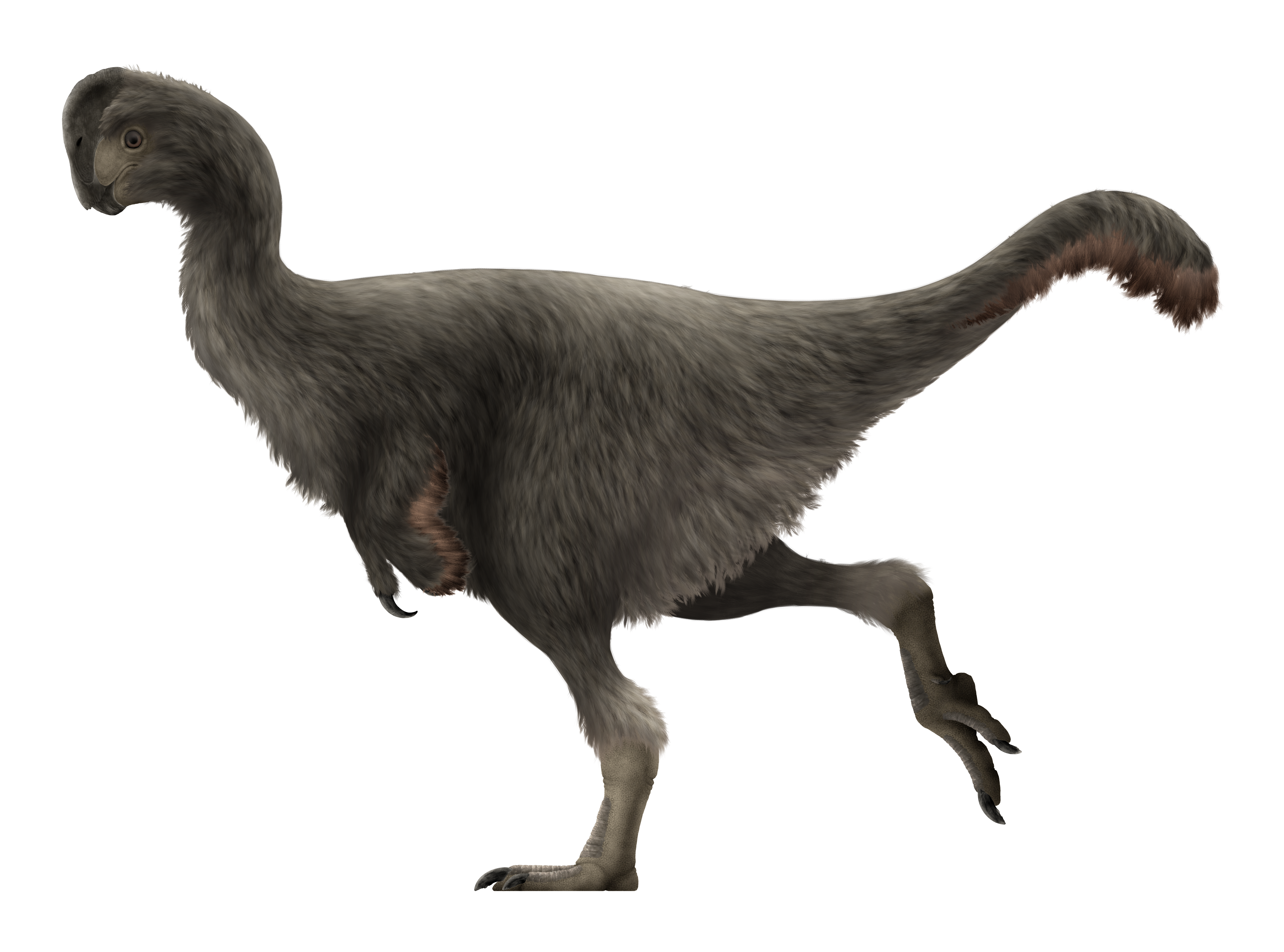
Life restoration

The describers' phylogenetic analysis places it as a derived member of the subfamily Heyuanninae in the family Oviraptoridae. It has been suggested that Oksoko represents a highly derived form in a series of oviraptorosaurs whose third digits have reduced over evolutionary time. Their cladogram is shown below (only relationships within Oviraptoridae are shown):

- Oviraptoridae
  - Nankangia
  - - Oviraptor
    - - Yulong
      - - Citipatiinae
          - Wulatelong
          - - - Rinchenia
              - Tongtianlong
            - - Ganzhousaurus
              - - - Citipati
                  - Zamyn Khondt oviraptorid
                - - Huanansaurus
                  - Corythoraptor
        - Heyuanninae
          - Shixinggia
          - - Khaan
            - - Conchoraptor
              - - Machairasaurus
                - - - Nemegtomaia
                    - - Heyuannia huangi
                      - Heyuannia yanshini
                  - - - Banji
                      - - Jiangxisaurus
                        - Oksoko

== Paleoenvironment ==
Oksoko was found in the Nemegt Formation, one of the most productive fossil sites in Mongolia. Oksoko lived alongside other theropods, such as other oviraptorosaurs, tyrannosaurids, dromaeosaurids, troodontids, alvarezsaurids, therizinosaurids, ornithomimosaurs, and early birds. Hadrosauroids, pachycephalosaurs, ankylosaurs, and titanosaurs are also known from the formation. Fossils of a pterosaur, crocodilians, and small mammals are also present.
