= Gyps bochenskii =

Gyps bochenskii Temporal range: Piacenzian

Scientific classification
- Kingdom: Animalia
- Phylum: Chordata
- Class: Aves
- Order: Accipitriformes
- Family: Accipitridae
- Genus: Gyps
- Species: †G. bochenskii

Binomial name
- †Gyps bochenskii Boev, 2010

Extinct species of bird

Gyps bochenskii is an extinct species of Old World vulture in the genus Gyps that lived during the Piacenzian stage of the Pliocene epoch.

== Distribution ==
Gyps bochenskii is known from the site of Varshets in Bulgaria.
