= Galerida bulgarica =

Galerida bulgarica Temporal range: Piacenzian

Scientific classification
- Kingdom: Animalia
- Phylum: Chordata
- Class: Aves
- Order: Passeriformes
- Family: Alaudidae
- Genus: Galerida
- Species: †G. bulgarica

Binomial name
- †Galerida bulgarica Boev, 2012

Extinct species of bird

Galerida bulgarica is an extinct species of lark that lived in Bulgaria during the Neogene period.
