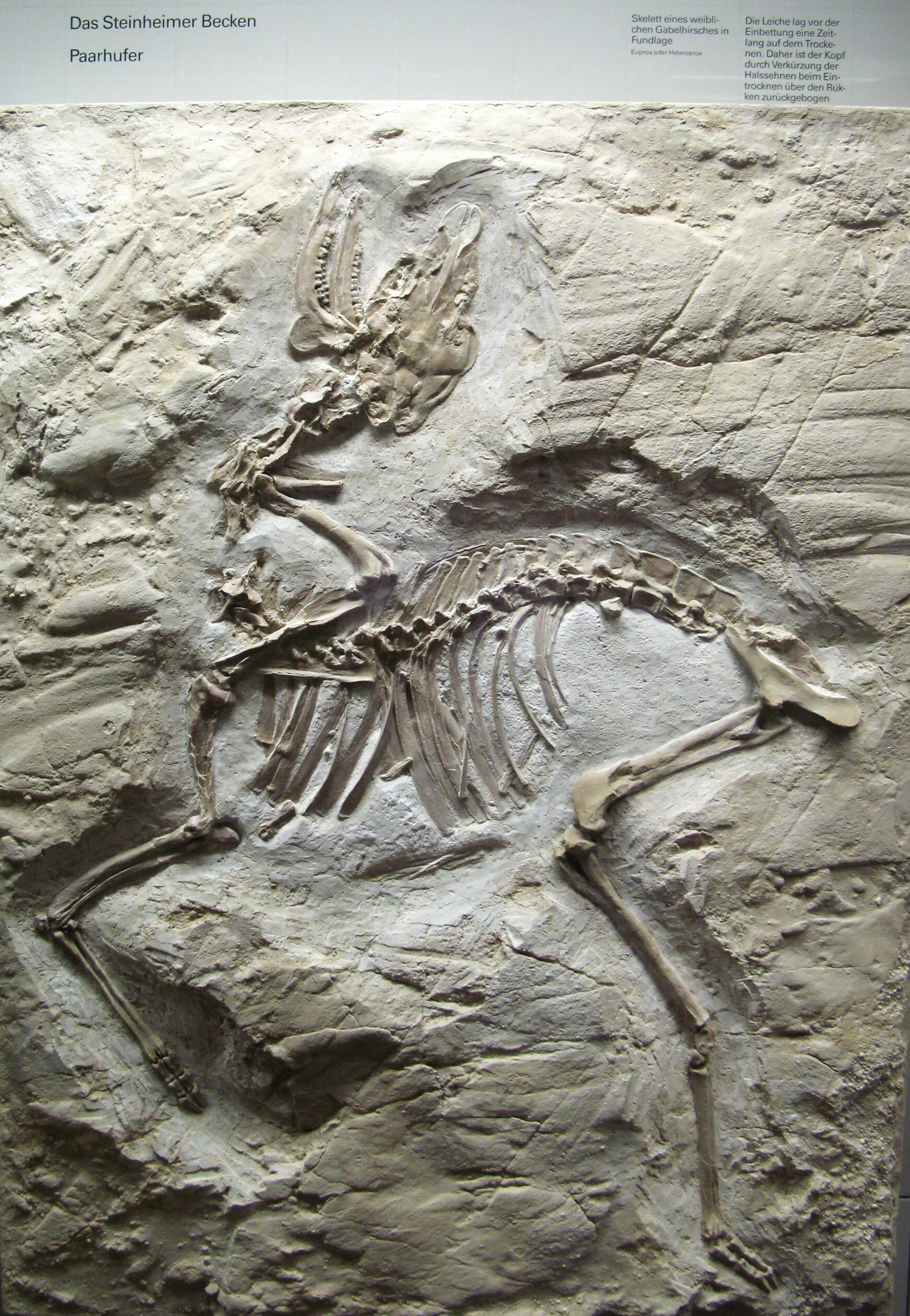
- Fossil of Euprox sp..

Scientific classification
- Kingdom: Animalia
- Phylum: Chordata
- Class: Mammalia
- Order: Artiodactyla
- Family: Cervidae
- Genus: †Euprox; Stehlin, 1928

Type species
- †Euprox furcatus Hensel, 1859 (As Prox furcatus)

Species
- E. altus Wang & Zhang, 2011; E. dicranocerus Kaup, 1839; E. furcatus; E. grandis Hou, 2015; E. margaritae Vislobokova, 1983; E. minimus Toula, 1884; E. robustus Dong, Liu & Pan, 2003

Synonyms
- Prox

= Euprox =

Euprox Temporal range: Mid - Late Miocene

Extinct genus of mammals

Euprox is an extinct genus of deer that lived in Eurasia during the Miocene epoch.

== Taxonomy ==
The type species Euprox furcatus was originally under the genus Prox, but that name was already taken. Depéret assigned it to the related genus Dicrocerus in 1887, before it was assigned to its current placement in 1928. Euprox dicranocerus and Euprox minimus were transferred to the genus soon after; they were originally described as Cervus dicranocerus and Dicracerus minimus, respectively.

== Description ==
Euprox was some of the earliest types of deer known to have true antlers. It would have resembled a muntjac in size and appearance, standing at up to 1 m (3.3 ft) in height.

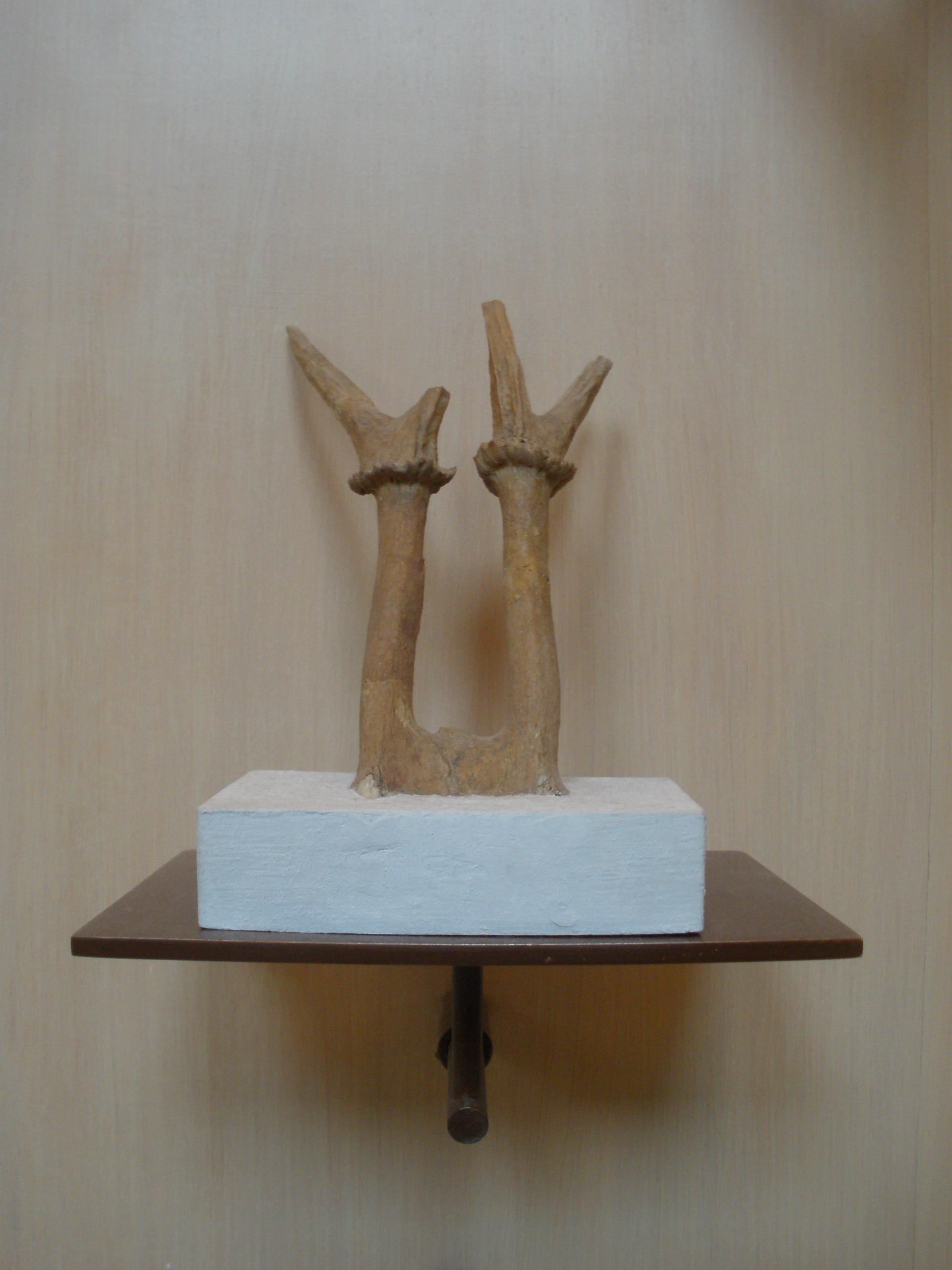
Antler of Euprox furcatus

The antlers of Euprox were short, with two small prongs projecting from the main branch. Euprox is notable for being the earliest deer to possess the presence of a real burr, which are indicative of the border between permanent and deciduous segments of deer antlers. It possessed brachydont teeth. The environment that Euprox inhabited would have been warm and humid, with many tropical forests.

== Palaeobiology ==
=== Palaeoecology ===
The brachydont dentition of Euprox suggests it likely fed on leaves. Paired measurements of ^{87}Sr/^{86}Sr, δ^{18}O_{CO3}, and δ^{13}C derived from the tooth enamel of E. furcatus indicate that it was a subcanopy browser. Paired dental mesowear and microwear of E. furcatus from the locality of Arroyo de Val 4 suggests that it was a browse-dominated mixed feeder, partitioning resources with Heteroprox larteti, whose dental wear patterns from the same site evidence that it exhibited a greater reliance on grass than E. furcatus.
