= Buteo spassovi =

Buteo spassovi Temporal range: Late Miocene

Scientific classification
- Kingdom: Animalia
- Phylum: Chordata
- Class: Aves
- Order: Accipitriformes
- Family: Accipitridae
- Genus: Buteo
- Species: †B. spassovi

Binomial name
- †Buteo spassovi Boev & Kovachev, 1999

Extinct species of bird

Buteo spassovi is an extinct species of Buteo that lived during the Late Miocene.

== Distribution ==
Buteo spassovi is known from southwestern Bulgaria.
