= MN 5 (biostratigraphic zone) =

Mammal neogene zone

In biostratigraphy, MN 5 is one of the MN zones used to characterize the fossil mammal faunas of the Neogene of Europe. It is preceded by MN 4 and followed by MN 6 and is part of the Orleanian age of the middle Miocene. MN 5 starts within magnetostratigraphic chron C5Cr, at 17.0 million years ago, and ends at the start of chron C5Bn.1r, at 15.0 million years ago, although some different correlations have been proposed. The reference locality used to correlate faunas with this zone is Pontlevoy-Thenay in France; other localities include La Retama in Spain, Castelnau-d'Arbieu in France, and Sandelzhausen in Germany.

In this zone, the muroid rodent Cricetodon first appears in western Europe, as do the poorly known Lartetomys and Mixocricetodon. In the extinct rodent family Eomyidae, the genus Ligerimys last appears during MN 5, but Keramidomys and Eomyops appear as immigrants. The last European marsupial, Amphiperatherium, last appears in France and Spain during MN 5, but persists into MN 6 in Germany.

The primate Pliopithecus first appears during MN 5. The rhinoceroses Prosantorhinus, Plesiaceratherium, Hispanotherium, and Gaindatherium make their last appearance, but Ancylotherium and Hoploaceratherium first appear during MN 5. Chalicotherium, a member of the related extinct family Chalicotheriidae, also appears for the first time. Several artiodactyls, such as the pig Conohyus, the deer Heteroprox and Dicrocerus, and the musk deer Micromeryx first appear, and the pigs Bunolistriodon and Aureliachoerus and the ruminants Amphimoschus and Lagomeryx last appear in MN 5. Two artiodactyl genera, Triceromeryx and Pseudoeotragus, occur only during MN 5. The primitive artiodactyl Cainotherium last appears in France and Spain, but persists into MN 6 in Germany.

== Literature cited ==
- Mein, P. 1999. European Miocene mammal biochronology. Pp. 25–38 in Rössner, G.E. and Heissig, K. (eds.). The Miocene Land Mammals of Europe. Munich: Verlag Dr. Friedrich Pfeil, 515 pp.
- Steininger, F. 1999. Chronostratigraphy, geochronology and biochronology of the Miocene "European Land Mammal Mega-Zones (ELMMZ)" and the Miocene "Mammal Zones (MN-Zones)". Pp. 9–24 in Rössner, G.E. and Heissig, K. (eds.). The Miocene Land Mammals of Europe. Munich: Verlag Dr. Friedrich Pfeil, 515 pp.
