= Mammal Paleogene zones =

The Mammal Paleogene zones or MP zones are a system of biostratigraphic biozones in the stratigraphic record used to correlate mammal-bearing fossil localities of the Paleogene period of Europe. It consists of thirty consecutive zones (numbered MP 1 through MP 30; MN 8 and 9 have been joined into MN 8 + 9 zone; and MP 17 zone is split into two zones – MP 17A and MP 17B zone) defined through reference faunas, well-known sites that other localities can be correlated with. MP 1 is the earliest zone, and MP 30 is the most recent. The Grande Coupure extinction and faunal turnover event marks the boundary between MP 20 and MP 21, the post-Grande Coupure faunas occurring by MP 21 onward. The MP zones are complementary with the MN zones in the Neogene.

These zones were proposed at the Congress in Mainz held in 1987 to help paleontologists provide more specific reference points to evolutionary events in Europe, but are used by paleontologists on other continents as well.

Epoch	ICS age	ELMMZ	Age (Ma)
Miocene	Aquitanian	Agenian	younger
Oligocene	Chattian	Arvernian	23.03–29.2
Oligocene	Rupelian	Arvernian	23.03–29.2
Oligocene	Rupelian	Suevian	29.2–33.8
Oligocene	Rupelian	Headonian	33.8–37.2
Eocene	Priabonian	Headonian	33.8–37.2
Eocene	Bartonian	Robiacian	37.2–42.7
Eocene	Lutetian	Robiacian	37.2–42.7
Eocene	Lutetian	Geiseltalian	42.7–48.5
Eocene	Lutetian	Grauvian	48.5–50.8
Eocene	Ypresian	Grauvian	48.5–50.8
Eocene	Ypresian	Neustrian	50.8–55.0
Paleocene	Thanetian	Neustrian	50.8–55.0
Paleocene	Thanetian	Cernaysian	55.0–55.9
Subdivision of the Paleogene period into European Land Mammal Mega Zones (ELMMZ).

The zones are as follows:

Interval	Start	End	ICS stages
MP 30	23.2 Ma	23.03 ± 0.05 Ma	Chattian
MP 29	23.9 Ma	23.2 Ma	Chattian
MP 28	24.6 ± 0.1 Ma	23.9 Ma	Chattian
MP 27	25.4 Ma	24.6 ± 0.1 Ma	Chattian
MP 26	27.3 Ma	25.4 Ma	Chattian
MP 25	28.8 Ma	27.3 Ma	Chattian – Rupelian
MP 24	30.0 Ma	28.8 Ma	Rupelian
MP 23	30.9 ± 0.1 Ma	30.0 Ma	Rupelian
MP 22	32.5 Ma	30.9 ± 0.1 Ma	Rupelian
MP 21	33.9 ± 0.05 Ma	32.5 Ma	Rupelian
MP 20	34.0 Ma	33.9 ± 0.05 Ma	Priabonian
MP 19	35.0 Ma	34.0 Ma	Priabonian
MP 18	37.0 Ma	35.0 Ma	Priabonian
MP 17B	37.5 Ma	37.0 Ma	Priabonian
MP 17A	37.8 Ma	37.5 Ma	Priabonian
MP 16	40.0 Ma	37.8 Ma	Bartonian
MP 15	41.2 Ma	40.0 Ma	Lutetian
MP 14	43.5 Ma	41.2 Ma	Lutetian
MP 13	44.9 Ma	43.5 Ma	Lutetian
MP 12	46.3 Ma	44.9 Ma	Lutetian
MP 11	47.8 Ma	46.3 Ma	Lutetian
MP 10	50.8 Ma	47.8 Ma	Ypresian
MP 8 + 9	55.2 Ma	50.8 Ma	Ypresian
MP 7	56.0 Ma	55.2 Ma	Ypresian
MP 6	57.2 Ma	56.0 Ma	Thanetian
MP 5		57.2 Ma	Thanetian
MP 4			Paleocene series
MP 3			Paleocene series
MP 2			Paleocene series
MP 1	66.043 ± 0.011 Ma	61.7 ± 0.05 Ma	Danian

== See also ==
- Mammal Neogene zones
- European land mammal age
- Geologic time scale
