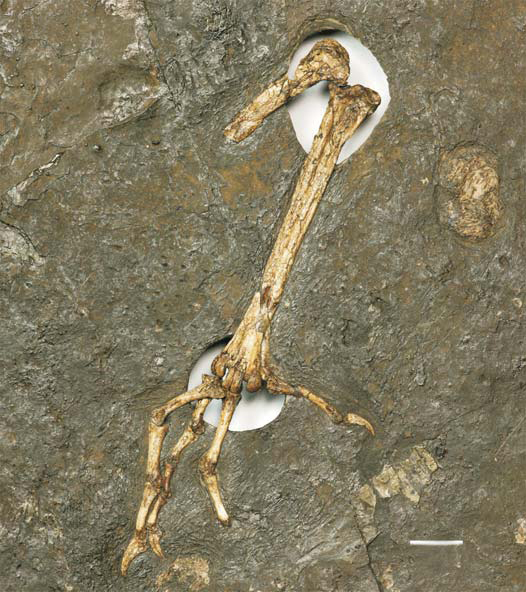
- Holotype

Scientific classification
- Domain: Eukaryota
- Kingdom: Animalia
- Phylum: Chordata
- Class: Aves
- Infraclass: Neognathae
- Genus: †Sanshuiornis; Wang et al., 2011

Species
- †S. zhangi Wang et al., 2011 (type)

= Sanshuiornis =

Sanshuiornis Temporal range: Middle Eocene

Extinct genus of birds

Sanshuiornis (meaning "bird from Sanshui Basin") is an extinct genus of bird from Middle Eocene deposits of Guangdong Province, south China. It is known from the holotype IVPP V18116 an articulated complete right leg and foot. It was found from the black oil shales of the Huayong Formation of the Sanshui Basin, near Foshan. It was first named by Min Wang, Gerald Mayr, Jiangyong Zhang and Zhonghe Zhou in 2011 and the type species is Sanshuiornis zhangi. Sanshuiornis shows resemblances to some Ciconiiformes birds.
