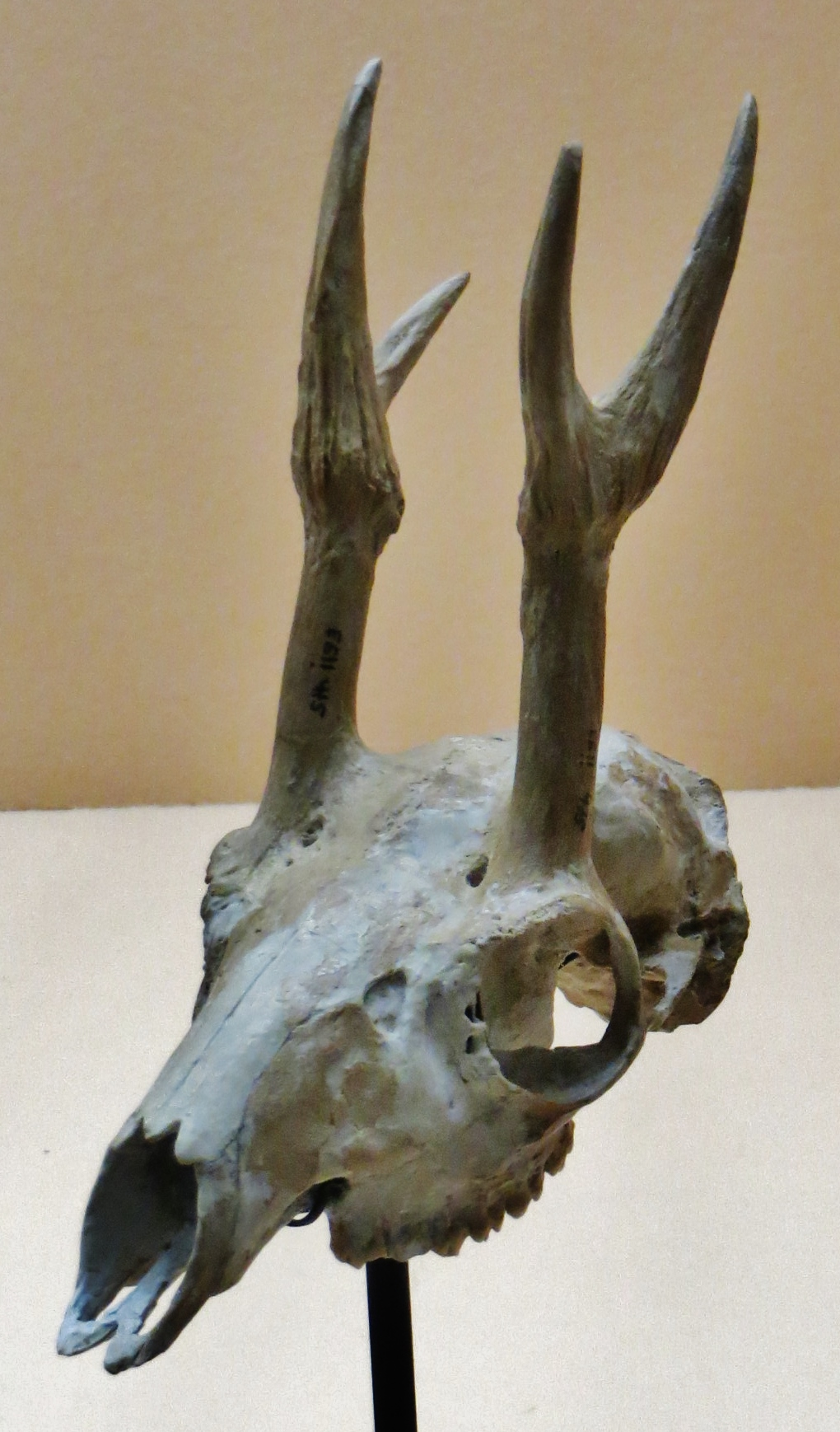
- Skull

Scientific classification
- Kingdom: Animalia
- Phylum: Chordata
- Class: Mammalia
- Infraclass: Placentalia
- Order: Artiodactyla
- Family: Cervidae
- Genus: †Heteroprox; Schaub, 1928

Type species
- †Heteroprox larteti Filhol, 1891 (as Cervus larteti)

Species
- H. anatoliensis; H. eggeri; H. larteti; H. moralesi

= Heteroprox =

Heteroprox Temporal range: 15.97–11.61 Ma Miocene

Extinct genus of deer

Heteroprox is an extinct genus of deer from the middle Miocene (MN5 − MN7) of Europe.

== Species ==
- Heteroprox anatoliensis (MN6) Geraads 2003
- Heteroprox eggeri (MN5) Rössner 2010
- Heteroprox larteti (MN5) Filhol 1891
- Heteroprox moralesi Azana 2000

Based on the strata in which the specimens were found, H. eggeri is thought to be the oldest of the four species. It is very similar in appearance to H. larteti and H. anatoliensis, leading one researcher to suggest that it is an ancestor of these species.

== Morphology ==
Heteroprox was a genus of a mid-sized deer with forked or branched antlers. Though Heteroprox antlers do not have a burr (a bony rim where the antlers attach to the skull), numerous antlers have been found as independent fossils, suggesting that the antlers were deciduous (i.e. routinely shed and regrown). They were likely covered in velvet during the growth period, as in modern cervids.

The upper canines of male Heteroprox were enlongated; Heteroprox deer would have been similar in appearance to the modern-day muntjac. The antlers and dentition of Heteroprox are also similar to those of Procervulus, the oldest known cervid, leading many paleontologists to surmise a close relation between the two genii.

Heteroprox deer would have stood about 1 m (3.3 ft) tall and weighed around 35 kg (77 lb). Heteroprox eggeri is the smallest of the four species with an estimated body weight of 24.0 ± 8.6 kg.

Heteroprox larteti and Heteroprox anatoliensis are very similar in appearance but are distinguished by subtle differences in dentition.

A maximum likelihood analysis of the coloration of Heteroprox moralesi based on its habitat and the coloration of extant cervid species concluded that H. moralesi likely exhibited dorsevental countershading and a lighter head and neck, both of which could serve to camouflage the deer. The authors also concluded that H. moralesi likely had darker limbs, a form of disruptive coloration found in some extant cervids.

== Description and etymology ==
Heteroprox anatoliensis was described in 2003 by Denis Geraads based on a specimen collected from Ankara, Turkey. The type specimen is held in the MTA Museum in Ankara.

Heteroprox eggeri was described in 2010 by Gertrud E. Rössner based on a specimen collected from Sandelzhausen in Bavaria, Germany (early middle MN5). The second portion of the binomial was chosen in honor of Josef Egger, the former mayor of the town of Mainburg and a supporter of the excavations. It was previously described under the names Procervulus dichotomus and Euprox furcatus. The type specimen is held at the Staatsammlung für Paläontologie und Geologie in Munich, Germany.

Heteroprox larteti was described in 1891 by the French naturalist Henri Filhol as Cervus larteti based on antler specimens collected from Sansan and Simorre in France (early middle MN5). It was re-described in 1928 under the current name by the Swiss paleontologist Hans Georg Stehlin as the founding member of the genus Heteroprox. The lectotype is held at Musée National d'Histoire in Paris, France.

Heteroprox moralesi was described by Beatriz Azanza in 2000 based on a specimen collected from the Puente de Vallecas district of Spain. The holotype is held in the Museo Nacional de Ciencias Naturales in Madrid, Spain.

== Palaeoecology ==
Based on its leg proportions, Heteroprox was probably semi-aquatic and lived in humid, swampy environments. As there is evidence for periodic shedding of Heteroprox antlers, they may have been used in ritualistic combat between members of the species.

Heteroprox eggeri

Based on the habits and habitat of modern small deer, Rössner predicts that H. eggeri likely occupied habitats with dense vegetation. This is consistent with dental wear analysis which suggests that H. eggeri was likely a browser rather than a grazer.

Heteroprox larteti

Dental microwear and mesowear indicates that H. larteti consumed significant quantities of abrasive grasses.

Heteroprox moralesi

Analysis of isotopes of carbon and oxygen present in the tooth enamel of H. moralesi suggests that it was likely a browser which inhabited "closed" forested areas as opposed to open grasslands. Based on the regions in which H. moralesi has been found and the climate conditions of the central Iberian Peninsula during the middle Miocene, H. moralesi likely inhabited patches of forest near arid and savannah environments.
