= Oberdorf am Hochegg =

- Former municipality
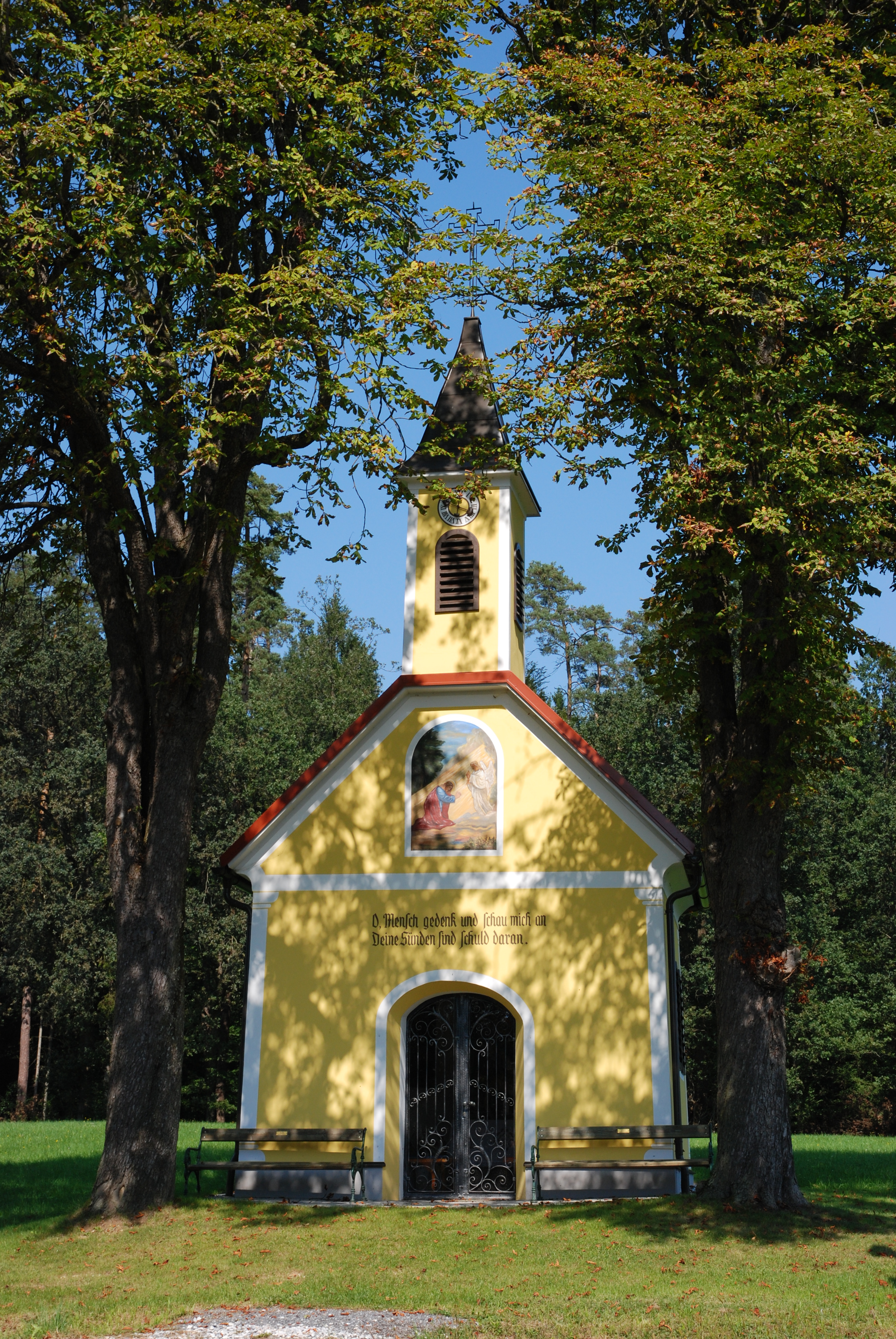
- Chapel in Radersdorf (part of Oberdorf am Hochegg)

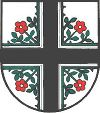
- Coat of arms

- Location within Austria
- Coordinates: 46°59′00″N 15°43′00″E
- Country: Austria
- State: Styria
- District: Südoststeiermark

Area
  - Total: 12.57 km^{2} (4.85 sq mi)
- Elevation: 350 m (1,150 ft)

Population (1 January 2016)
  - Total: 725
  - Density: 57.7/km^{2} (149/sq mi)
- Time zone: UTC+1 (CET)
  - Summer (DST): UTC+2 (CEST)
- Postal code: 8324
- Area code: +43 3115
- Vehicle registration: FB
- Website: www.oberdorf-hochegg. steiermark.at

Oberdorf am Hochegg is a former municipality in the district of Südoststeiermark in the Austrian state of Styria. Since the 2015 Styria municipal structural reform, it is part of the municipality Kirchberg an der Raab.

== Population ==
Historical population
Year	Pop.	±%
1869	714	—
1880	780	+9.2%
1890	815	+4.5%
1900	879	+7.9%
1910	873	−0.7%
1923	833	−4.6%
1934	844	+1.3%
1939	808	−4.3%
1951	763	−5.6%
1961	735	−3.7%
1971	759	+3.3%
1981	754	−0.7%
1991	793	+5.2%
2001	759	−4.3%
2013	741	−2.4%
