= Athene vallgornerensis =

Athene vallgornerensis Temporal range: Early Pleistocene

Scientific classification
- Kingdom: Animalia
- Phylum: Chordata
- Class: Aves
- Order: Strigiformes
- Family: Strigidae
- Genus: Athene
- Species: †A. vallgornerensis

Binomial name
- †Athene vallgornerensis Guerra et al., 2012

Extinct species of bird

Athene vallgornerensis is an extinct species of Athene that inhabited Spain during the Early Pleistocene.
