= Primophaps =

Primophaps Temporal range: Late Oligocene 28.1–23.03 Ma

Scientific classification
- Kingdom: Animalia
- Phylum: Chordata
- Class: Aves
- Order: Columbiformes
- Family: Columbidae
- Genus: †Primophaps; Worthy, 2012
- Species: †P. schoddei

Binomial name
- †Primophaps schoddei Worthy, 2012

Extinct genus of birds

Primophaps is an extinct genus of pigeon from the Late Oligocene of Australia. It was described in 2012 by Trevor Worthy from fossils found at the Riversleigh World Heritage Area. It was closely related to the Australian bronzewing pigeons, especially those in the genus Phaps. The genus contains only one species, P. schoddei.

== History and naming ==
The holotype specimen, QMF 45234, of Primophaps was recovered from the ‘Hiatus A’ site at the Riversleigh World Heritage Area, in the Boodjamulla National Park of north-western Queensland. The specimen is a left coracoid that was prepared from a block of limestone. It was described alongside fragmentary columbid fossils from South Australia in 2012 by Trevor Worthy.

The genus name comes from the Latin primordium, (“beginning” or “origin”), and the Greek phaps (“pigeon”). The specific epithet honours Australian taxonomist Richard Schodde for his work on the relationships of Australian birds.

== Description ==
Primophaps is similar to bronzewing pigeons in that the insertion of the plica synovialis coracoidea is represented by a small, distinct nodule present at the dorsal end of the coracoid that projects past the glenoid process. The nodule is separated from the articular facet for the clavicle by a groove. This groove forms a link, in the form of an even curve, between the impression of the acrocoracohumeral ligament and the furrow for the M. supracoracoideus muscle. The insertion for the acrocoraco-acromion ligament is represented by a rugosity that is next to the medial side of the groove. The articular face for the clavicle is planar, with its sternal margin forming a crest.

== Paleobiology ==
Primophaps is known exclusively from the Late Oligocene ‘Hiatus A’ site at Riversleigh, making it the oldest record of columbids globally. Riversleigh, at the time, was covered in open temperate woodlands, with patches of rainforest possibly being present around forest pools and watercourses. Like its relatives, the bronzewing pigeons, it probably was a ground feeder that ate seeds.
