= Picavus =

Picavus litencicensis Temporal range: Rupelian

Scientific classification
- Domain: Eukaryota
- Kingdom: Animalia
- Phylum: Chordata
- Class: Aves
- Order: Piciformes
- Family: †Picavidae; Mayr & Gregorová, 2012
- Genus: †Picavus; Mayr & Gregorová, 2012
- Species: †P. litencicensis

Binomial name
- †Picavus litencicensis Mayr & Gregorová, 2012

Extinct genus of birds

Picavus litencicensis is an extinct bird in the order Piciformes. It existed during the Rupelian (early Oligocene) in what is now the Czech Republic. It was described by Gerald Mayr and Růžena Gregorová in 2012, and is the only species in the family Picavidae.
