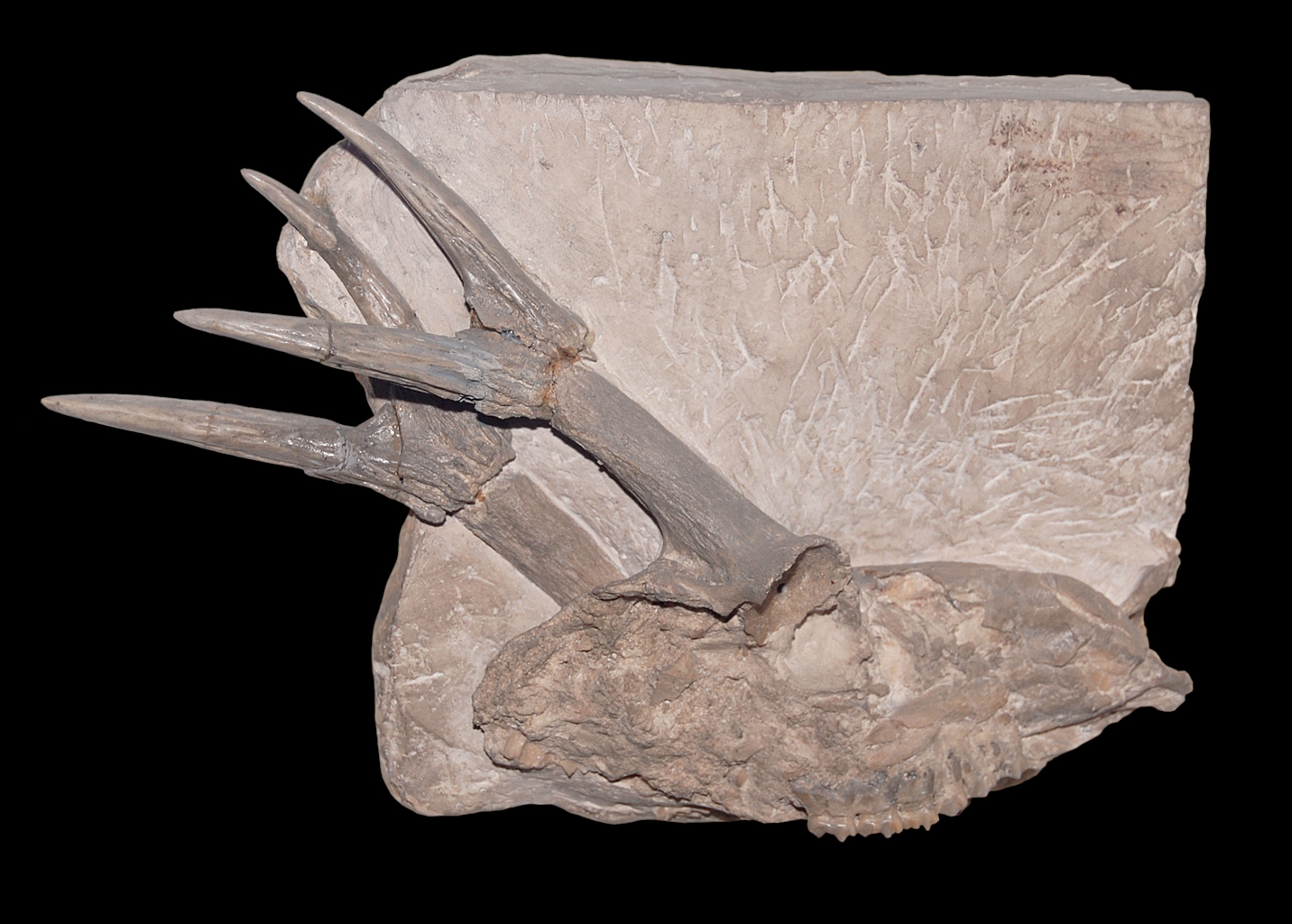
- Dicrocerus skull, Natural History Museum.

Scientific classification
- Kingdom: Animalia
- Phylum: Chordata
- Class: Mammalia
- Order: Artiodactyla
- Family: Cervidae
- Genus: †Dicrocerus; Lartet, 1837

Type species
- †Dicrocerus elegans Lartet, 1837

Species
- D. belometchetkense; D. elegans; D. grangeri; D. salomeae

= Dicrocerus =

Dicrocerus Temporal range: Middle - Late Miocene

Extinct genus of mammal

Dicrocerus elegans (Greek for "fork antler") is an extinct species of deer found in France, Europe. Dicrocerus probably came from Asia, from the region where true deer are believed to have originated and evolved. It inhabited forests in the temperate belt and in Europe it was typical of the Miocene (15-5 million years ago).

== Description ==
Dicrocerus stood 70 cm (2 ft 4 in) tall at the shoulder - the same size as the modern roe deer. Its long skull sported a set of antlers with a thickened base - the first known member of cervids to possess them. The antlers were still quite primitive and had no tines; they were worn only by the males. Like modern deer, Dicrocerus shed its antlers every year. The main stem was shorter in each new set. The same is seen in modern muntjacs.

== Gallery ==
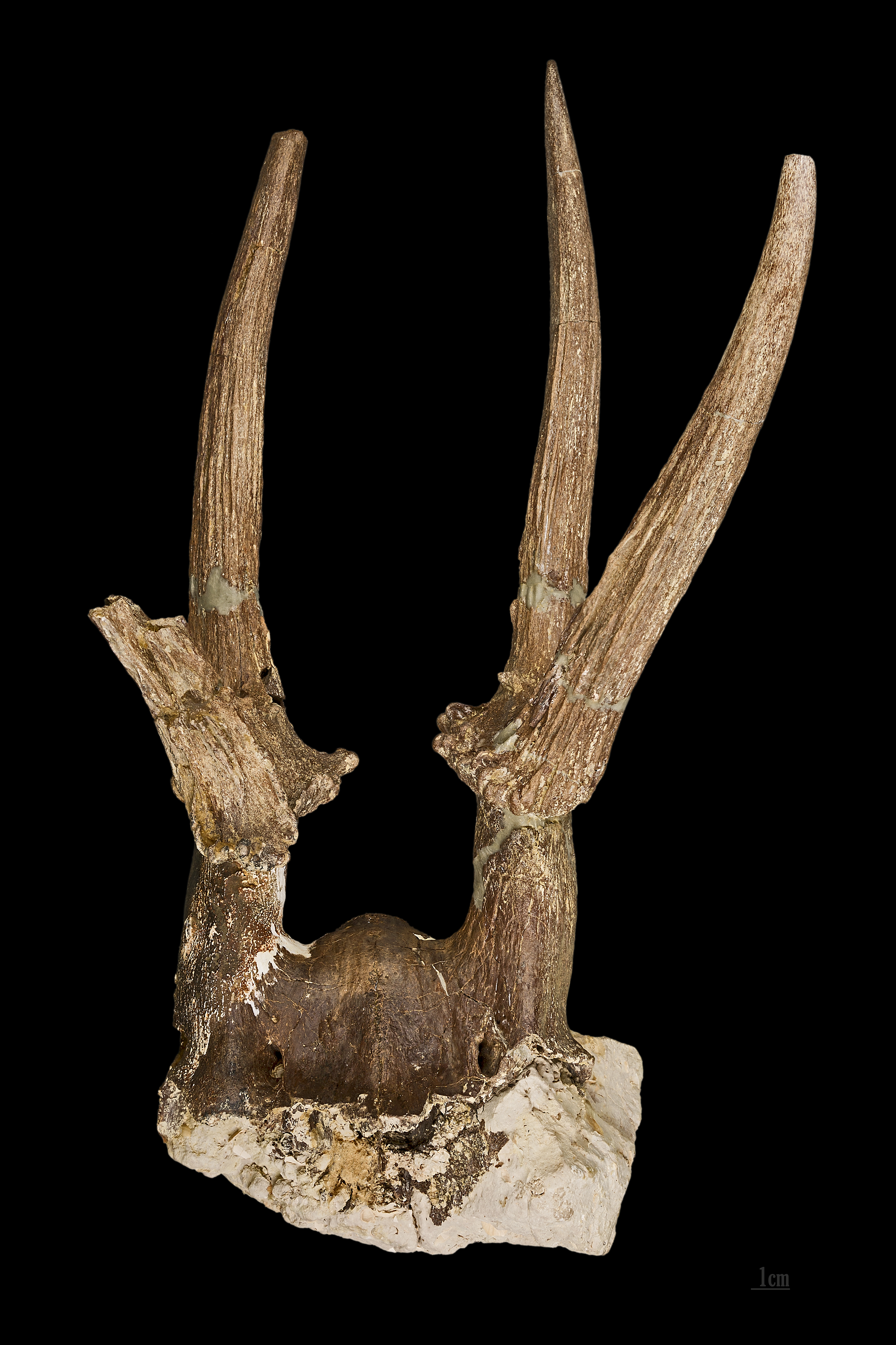
Dicrocerus elegans Collection Lartet MHNT

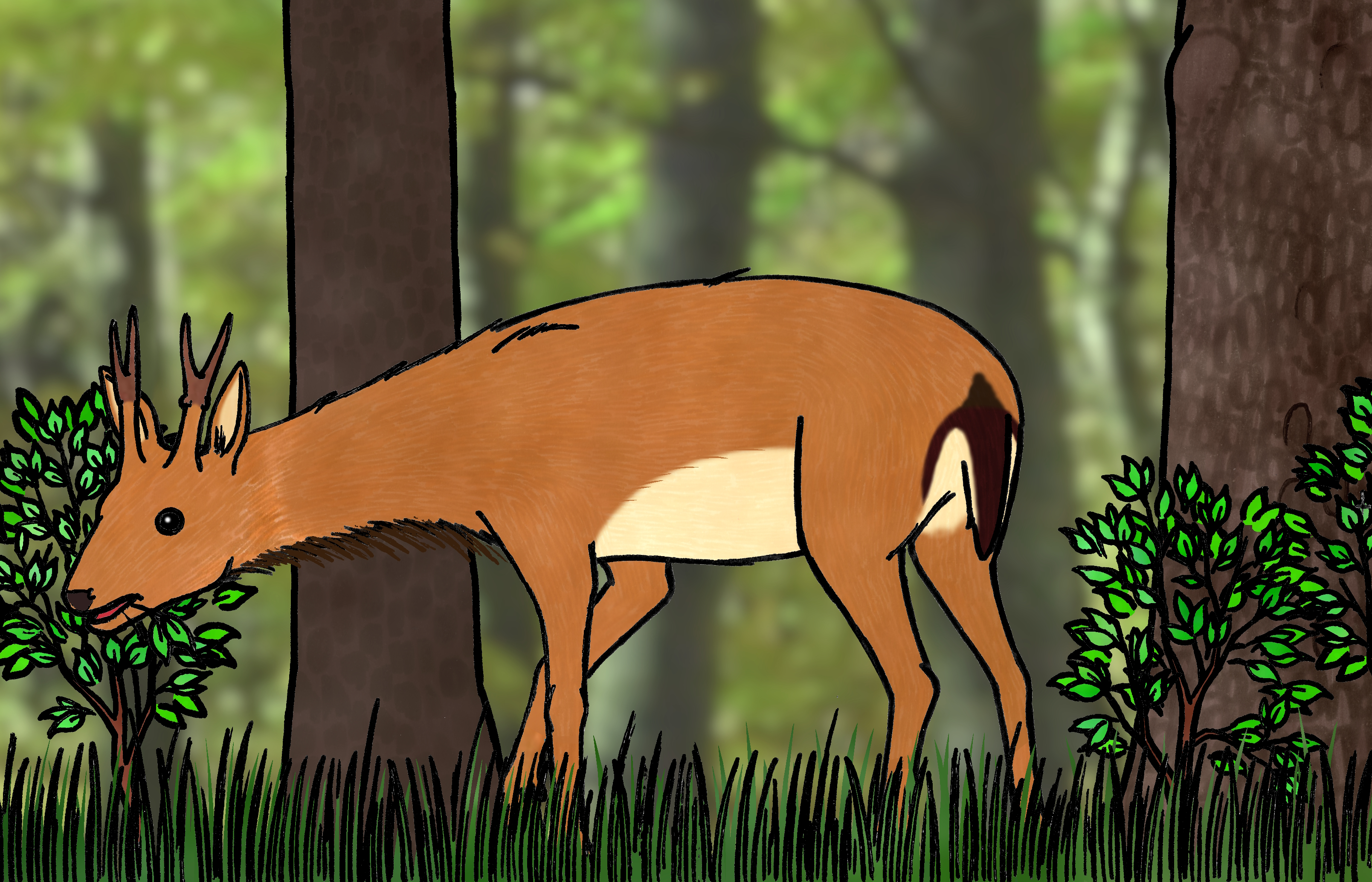
Artist impression of Dicrocerus.

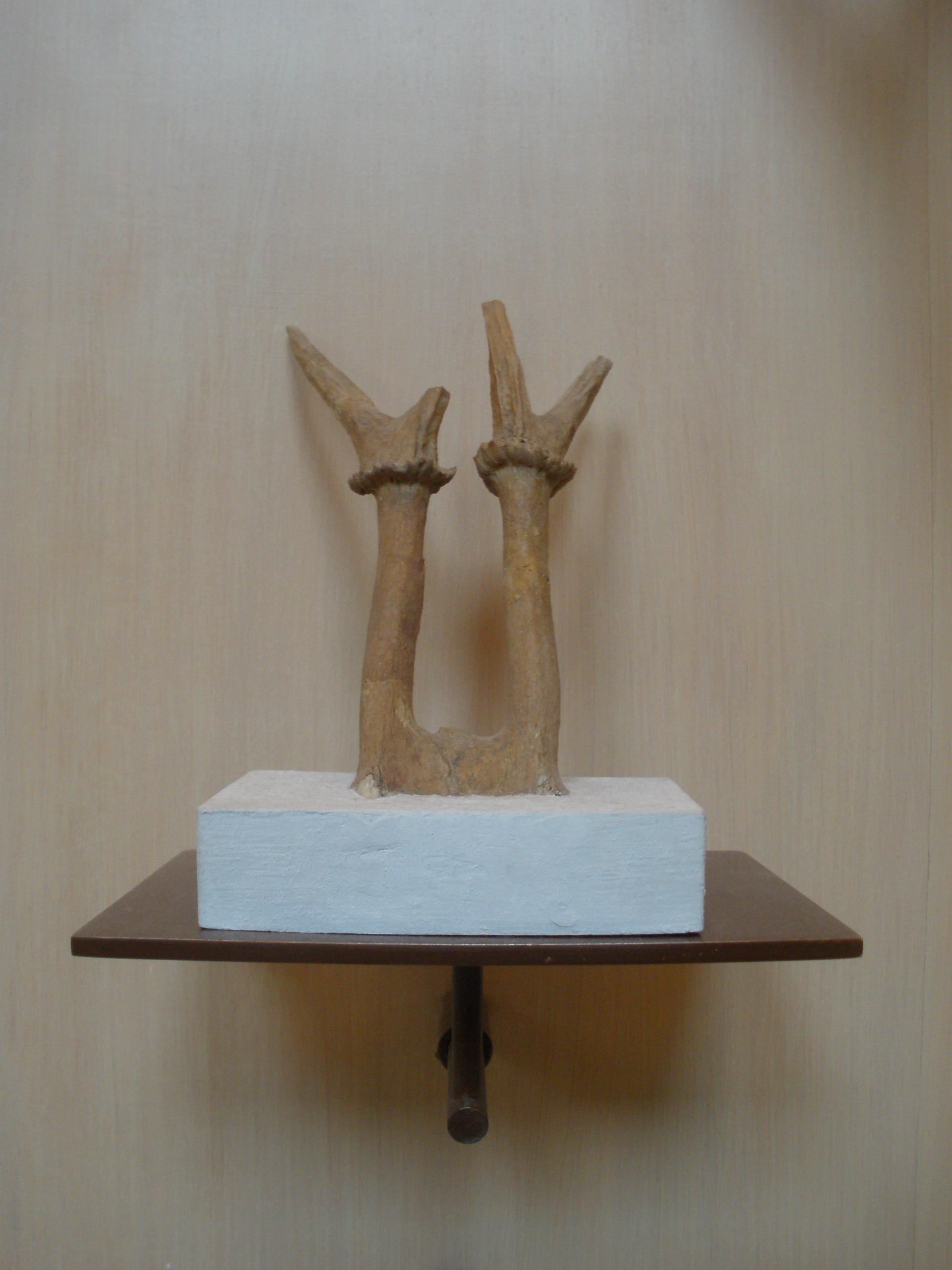
Horns from the species D. furcatus (now placed in Euprox).
