= Corwin Sullivan =

Canadian vertebrate palaeontologist

- Citizenship: Canadian
- Known for: Archosaur palaeobiology
- Scientific career
- Institutions: University of Alberta

Corwin Sullivan is a Canadian vertebrate palaeontologist known for his research into the evolution of archosaurs.

== Career ==
Sullivan completed his undergraduate degree at the University of Victoria, going on to earn a master's degree from the University of Toronto at Mississauga and a doctorate from Harvard University. After spending time as a faculty member at the Institute of Vertebrate Paleontology and Paleoanthropology (IVPP), he became the inaugural holder of the Philip J. Currie Professorship in Vertebrate Paleontology at the University of Alberta, named after Philip J. Currie. He also serves as the curator of the Philip J. Currie Dinosaur Museum in Grande Prairie, Alberta.

Sullivan has extensively studied the functional morphology of theropod dinosaurs, especially those phylogenetically close to birds, in an effort to gain insight as to how wings evolved in the theropod lineage.

Below is a list of taxa that Sullivan has contributed to naming:

Year	Taxon	Authors
2024	Gandititan cavocaudatus gen. et sp. nov.	Han, Yang, Lou, Sullivan, Xu, Qiu, Liu, Yu, Wu, Ke, Xu, Hu, & Lu
2023	Gremlin slobodorum gen. et sp. nov.	Ryan, Micucci, Rizo, Sullivan, Lee, & Evans
2022	Baisesaurus robustus gen. et sp. nov.	Ren, Jiang, Xiang, Sullivan, He, Cheng, & Han
2022	Confuciusornis shifan sp. nov.	Wang, Hu, Zhang, Wang, Zhao, Sullivan, & Xu
2020	Oksoko avarsan gen. et sp. nov.	Funston, Tsogtbaatar, Tsogtbaatar, Kobayashi, Sullivan, & Currie
2019	Lingyuanosaurus sihedangensis gen. et. sp. nov.	Yao, Liao, Sullivan, & Xu
2018	Bannykus wulatensis gen. et sp. nov.	Xu, Choiniere, Tan, Benson, Clark, Sullivan, Zhao, Han, Ma, He, Wang, Xing, & Tan
2018	Xiyunykus pengi gen. et sp. nov.	Xu, Choiniere, Tan, Benson, Clark, Sullivan, Zhao, Han, Ma, He, Wang, Xing, & Tan
2018	Anomalipes zhaoi gen. et sp. nov.	Yu, Wang, Chen, Sullivan, Wang, Wang, & Xu
2015	Ischioceratops zhuchengensis gen. et sp. nov.	He, Makovicky, Wang, Chen, Sullivan, Han, & Xu
2015	Yi qi gen. et sp. nov.	Xu, Zheng, Sullivan, Wang, Xing, Wang, Zhang, O'Connor, Zhang, & Pan
2014	Zhanghenglong yangchengensis gen. et sp. nov.	Xing, Wang, Han, Sullivan, Ma, He, Hone, Yan, Du, & Xu
2013	Wulatelong gobiensis gen. et sp. nov.	Xu, Tan, Wang, Sullivan, Hone, Han, Ma, Tan, & Xiao
2013	Ganzhousaurus nankangensis gen. et sp. nov.	Wang, Sun, Sullivan, & Xu
2012	Xiangornis shenmi gen. et sp. nov.	Hu, Xu, Hou, & Sullivan
2012	Yutyrannus huali gen. et sp. nov.	Xu, Wang, Zhang, Ma, Xing, Sullivan, Hu, Cheng, & Wang
2011	Zhuchengtyrannus magnus gen. et sp. nov.	Hone, Wang, Sullivan, Zhao, Chen, Li, Ji, Ji, & Xu
2011	Linhevenator tani gen. et sp. nov.	Xu, Tan, Sullivan, Han, & Xiao
2011	Linhenykus monodactylus gen. et sp. nov.	Xu, Sullivan, Pittman, Choiniere, Hone, Upchurch, Tan, Xiao, Tan, & Han
2010	Linheraptor exquisitus gen. et sp. nov.	Xu, Choiniere, Pittman, Tan, Xiao, Li, Tan, Clark, Norell, Hone, & Sullivan
2010	Zhuchengceratops inexpectus gen. et sp. nov.	Xu, Wang, Zhao, Sullivan, & Chen
2009	Anchiornis huxleyi gen. et sp. nov.	Xu, Zhao, Norell, Sullivan, Hone, Erickson, Wang, Han, & Guo
2009	Limusaurus inextricabilis gen. et sp. nov.	Xu, Clark, Mo, Chorniere, Forster, Erickson, Hone, Sullivan, Eberth, Nesbitt, Zhao, Hernandez, Jia, Han, & Guo
2008	Epidexipteryx hui gen. et sp. nov.	Zhang, Zhou, Xu, Wang, & Sullivan
