= Pavel Patev =

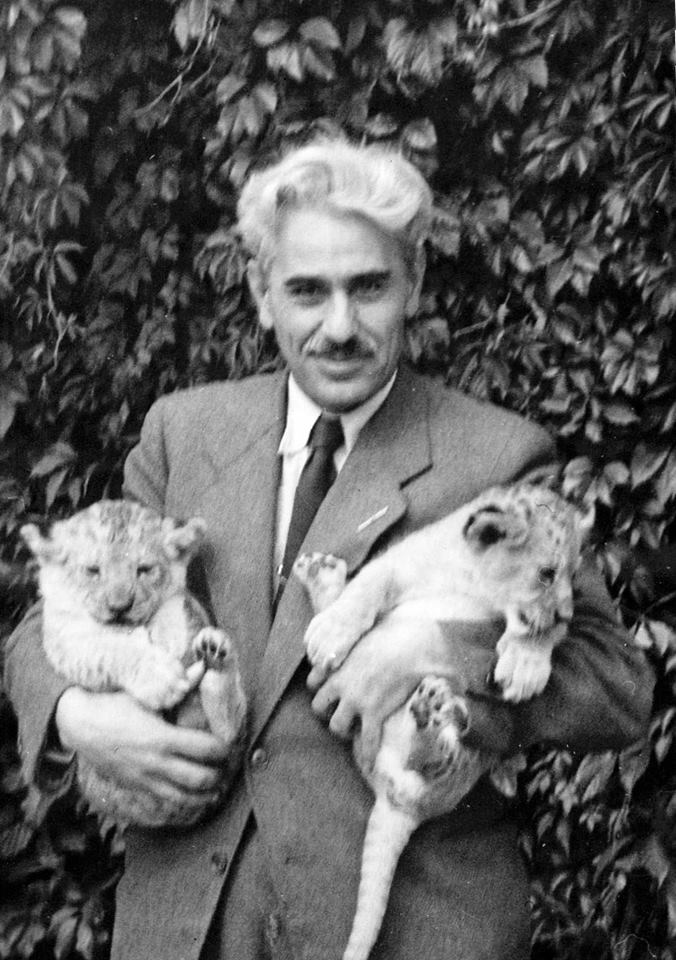
Patev with two lion cubs at the Sofia Zoo, 1939

Pavel Atanasov Patev (1889-22 March 1950) was a Bulgarian zoologist known for his work in ornithology and his role as the director of the Sofia Zoo. He wrote a major monograph on the Birds of Bulgaria (1950).

Patev was born in Plovdiv, Bulgaria. Patev served as director of the Sofia Zoo from 1934 till the end of his life. The fossil crossbill Loxia patevi was named after him by Zlatozar Boev.
