= Aix praeclara =

Aix praeclara Temporal range: Middle Miocene

Scientific classification
- Kingdom: Animalia
- Phylum: Chordata
- Class: Aves
- Order: Anseriformes
- Family: Anatidae
- Genus: Aix
- Species: †A. praeclara

Binomial name
- †Aix praeclara Zelenkov & Kurochkin, 2012

Extinct species of bird

Aix praeclara is an extinct species of Aix that inhabited Mongolia during the Middle Miocene.
