= Mammal Neogene zones =

The Mammal Neogene zones or MN zones are system of biostratigraphic zones in the stratigraphic record used to correlate mammal-bearing fossil localities of the Neogene period of Europe. It consists of seventeen consecutive zones (numbered MN 1 through MN 18; MN 7 and 8 have been joined into MN 7/8 zone) defined through reference faunas, well-known sites that other localities can be correlated with. MN 1 is the earliest zone, and MN 18 is the most recent. The MN zones are complementary with the MP zones in the Paleogene.

Neogene ELMMZ

The zones are as follows:

Interval	Reference Locality	Start	End	ICS stages
MN 18		2.0 Ma	0 Ma	Gelasian to present
MN 17	Saint-Vallier (France)	2.5 Ma	2.0 Ma	Gelasian
MN 16	Arondelli / Triversa (Italy)	3.2 Ma	2.5 Ma	Gelasian - Piacenzian - Zanclean
MN 15	Perpignan (France)	4.2 Ma	3.2 Ma	Zanclean
MN 14	Podlesice (Poland)	4.9 Ma	4.2 Ma	Zanclean
MN 13	El Arquilla (Spain)	7.0 Ma (between 6.8 and 7.2 Ma)	4.9 Ma	Zanclean - Messinian
MN 12	Los Mansuetos (Spain)	7.75 Ma (between 8.0 and 7.5 Ma)	7.0 Ma (between 6.8 and 7.2 Ma)	Messinian - Tortonian
MN 11	Crevillente 2 (Spain)	8.7 Ma	7.75 Ma (between 8.0 and 7.5 Ma)	Tortonian
MN 10	Masia del Barbo (Spain)	9.7 Ma	8.7 Ma	Tortonian
MN 9	Can Llobateres (Spain)	11.1 Ma	9.7 Ma	Tortonian
MN 7/8	La Grive M (France)	12.75 Ma (between 13.0 and 12.5 Ma)	11.1 Ma	Tortonian - Serravallian
MN 6	Sansan (France)	13.7 Ma	12.75 Ma (between 13.0 and 12.5 Ma)	Serravallian
MN 5	Faluns Pont Levoy- Thenay (France)	16.0 Ma	13.7 Ma	Serravallian - Langhian - Burdigalian
MN 4	La Romieu (France)	16.9 Ma (between 16.6 and 17.2 Ma)	16.0 Ma	Burdigalian
MN 3	Wintershof-West (Germany)	20.0 Ma	16.9 Ma (between 16.6 and 17.2 Ma)	Burdigalian
MN 2	Montaigu (France); Laugnac (France)	22.4 Ma	20.0 Ma	Burdigalian - Aquitanian
MN 1	Paulhiac (France)	23.03 ± 0.05 Ma	22.4 Ma	Aquitanian

== See also ==
- Mammal Paleogene zones
- European land mammal age
- Geologic time scale
