= Zlatozar Boev =

Bulgarian scientist

DSc Zlatozar Nikolaev Boev
- Born: 20 October 1955 (age 70); Sofia, Bulgaria
- Education: Sofia University
- Occupations: Ornithologist, paleontologist, zoologist
- Father: Nikolay Boev

Zlatozar Nikolaev Boev (born 20 October 1955) is a Bulgarian ornithologist, paleontologist, and zoologist. He has published hundreds of peer-reviewed scientific papers and other academic material in Bulgarian, English, French, and Russian. He has classified 36 taxa. Boev is part of the National Museum of Natural History, the Bulgarian Society for the Protection of Birds, and the Bulgarian Ornithological Society.

Below is a list of taxa that Boev has contributed to naming:

Year	Taxon	Authors
2015	Porzana botunensis sp. nov.	Boev
2013	Aquila kurochkini sp. nov.	Boev
2011	Falco bulgaricus sp. nov.	Boev
2010	Gyps bochenskii sp. nov.	Boev
1999	Loxia patevi sp. nov.	Boev
1999	Buteo spassovi sp. nov.	Boev & Kovachev
