= 2013 in archosaur paleontology =

The year 2013 in archosaur paleontology was eventful. Archosaurs include the only living dinosaur group — birds — and the reptile crocodilians, plus all extinct dinosaurs, extinct crocodilian relatives, and pterosaurs. Archosaur palaeontology is the scientific study of those animals, especially as they existed before the Holocene Epoch began about 10,000 years ago. The year 2013 in paleontology included various significant developments regarding archosaurs.

This article records new taxa of fossil archosaurs of every kind that have been described during the year 2013, as well as other significant discoveries and events related to paleontology of archosaurs that occurred in the year 2013.

== Pseudosuchians ==
=== Research ===
- Mesoeucrocodylian fossils, which might be the first recorded Cenozoic fossils of atoposaurids, are described from the Eocene Kaninah Formation of Yemen by Stevens et al. (2013).

=== New taxa ===
Name	Novelty	Status	Authors	Age	Unit	Location	Notes	Images
Agaresuchus	Sp. nov	Valid	Puértolas-Pascual, Canudo & Moreno-Azanza	Late Cretaceous (late Maastrichtian)	Tremp Formation	Spain	A eusuchian crocodylomorph belonging to the family Allodaposuchidae. Originally described as a species of Allodaposuchus; Narváez et al. (2016) transferred it to the genus Agaresuchus.	
Almadasuchus	Gen. et sp. nov	Valid	Pol et al.	Late Jurassic (Oxfordian)	Sediments alternatively referred by different authors to the Cañadón Calcáreo Formation or to the Puesto Almada Member of the Cañadón Asfalto Formation	Argentina	A non-crocodyliform crocodylomorph. The type species is Almadasuchus figarii.	
Anteophthalmosuchus escuchae	Sp. nov	Valid	Buscalioni et al.	Early Cretaceous (Albian)	Escucha Formation	Spain	A goniopholidid, a species of Anteophthalmosuchus.	
Apatosuchus	Gen. et comb. nov	Valid	Sues & Schoch	Late Triassic (Norian)	Löwenstein Formation	Germany	A non-crocodylomorph loricatan pseudosuchian, a new genus for "Halticosaurus" orbitoangulatus Huene (1932).	
Batrachomimus	Gen. et sp. nov	Valid	Montefeltro et al.	Late Jurassic		Brazil	A neosuchian crocodyliform related to Rugosuchus and Shamosuchus. The type species is Batrachomimus pastosbonensis.	
Brochuchus	Gen. et comb. nov	Valid	Conrad et al.	Miocene	Hiwegi Formation	Kenya	A new genus for "Crocodylus" pigotti.	
Caiman gasparinae	Sp. nov	Valid	Bona & Carabajal	Late Miocene		Argentina	A caiman. Originally described as a species of Caiman; transferred to the separate genus Paranasuchus by Bona et al. (2024).	
Caiman venezuelensis	Sp. nov	Junior synonym	Fortier & Rincón	Pleistocene		Venezuela	A caiman, a species of Caiman. Considered to be a junior synonym of extant spectacled caiman (Caiman crocodilus) by Cidade et al. (2019).	
Centenariosuchus	Gen. et sp. nov	Valid	Hastings et al.	Early or middle Miocene	Cucaracha Formation	Panama	A caiman. The type species is Centenariosuchus gilmorei.	
Chalawan	Gen. et comb. nov	Valid	Martin et al.	Early Cretaceous	Phu Kradung Formation	Thailand	A pholidosaurid, a new genus for "Sunosuchus" thailandicus.	
Cricosaurus lithographicus	Sp. nov	Valid	Herrera, Gasparini & Fernández	Late Jurassic (Tithonian)	Neuquén Basin	Argentina	A metriorhynchid, a species of Cricosaurus.	
Crocodylus falconensis	Sp. nov	Valid	Scheyer et al.	Early Pliocene	San Gregorio Formation	Venezuela	A species of Crocodylus.	
Culebrasuchus	Gen. et sp. nov	Valid	Hastings et al.	Probably early Miocene	Culebra Formation	Panama	A caiman. The type species is Culebrasuchus mesoamericanus.	
Eocaiman itaboraiensis	Sp. nov	Valid	Pinheiro et al.	Itaboraian	Itaboraí Basin	Brazil	A species of Eocaiman.	
Globidentosuchus	Gen. et sp. nov	Valid	Scheyer et al.	Late Miocene	Urumaco Formation	Venezuela	A caiman. The type species is Globidentosuchus brachyrostris	
Gondwanasuchus	Gen. et sp. nov	Valid	Marinho et al.	Late Cretaceous	Bauru Group	Brazil	A baurusuchid. The type species is Gondwanasuchus scabrosus.	
Hulkepholis	Gen. et comb. et sp. nov	Valid	Buscalioni et al.	Early Cretaceous	Escucha Formation; Grinstead Clay Formation	Spain; United Kingdom	A goniopholidid, a new genus for "Goniopholis" willetti Salisbury & Naish (2011); genus also contains a new species Hulkepholis plotos.	
Maledictosuchus	Gen. et sp. nov	Valid	Parrilla-Bel et al.	Middle Jurassic (middle Callovian)	Ágreda Formation	Spain	A metriorhynchid. The type species is Maledictosuchus riclaensis.	
Paluxysuchus	Gen. et sp. nov	Valid	Adams	Early Cretaceous (late Aptian)	Twin Mountains Formation	United States	A neosuchian crocodyliform. The type species is Paluxysuchus newmani.	
Stenomyti	Gen. et sp. nov	Valid	Small & Martz	Late Triassic	Chinle Formation	United States	An aetosaur. The type species is Stenomyti huangae.	
Torvoneustes coryphaeus	Sp. nov	Valid	Young et al.	Late Jurassic (Kimmeridgian)	Kimmeridge Clay Formation	United Kingdom	A metriorhynchid, a species of Torvoneustes.	
Tyrannoneustes	Gen. et sp. nov	Valid	Young et al.	Middle Jurassic	Oxford Clay Formation	United Kingdom	A metriorhynchid. The type species is Tyrannoneustes lythrodectikos.	

== Newly named basal dinosauromorphs ==
Name	Novelty	Status	Authors	Age	Unit	Location	Notes	Images
Ignotosaurus	Gen. et sp. nov	Valid	Martínez et al.	Late Triassic (late Carnian)	Ischigualasto Formation	Argentina	A silesaurid. The type species is Ignotosaurus fragilis.	
Lutungutali	Gen. et sp. nov	Valid	Peecook et al.	Middle Triassic (Anisian)	Ntawere Formation	Zambia	A silesaurid. The type species is Lutungutali sitwensis.	

== Non-avian dinosaurs ==
=== Research ===
- A new Troodontid Tooth is reported from Kallamedu Formation of India.
- A study on the reproductive strategies of dinosaurs is published by Werner & Griebeler (2013).
- A re-analysis of prior studies on the dinosaur growth rates is published by Myhrvold (2013).
- A study on an assemblage of specimens of Aniksosaurus darwini from the Upper Cretaceous Bajo Barreal Formation (Argentina) evaluating whether the assemblage is truly monospecific and whether or not all the individuals died at the same time based on taphonomic data, is published by Ibiricu et al. (2013).
- Redescription of Lusotitan atalaiensis and a study on the phylogenetic relationships of basal titanosauriform sauropods is published by Mannion et al. (2013).
- A review of all fossil specimens referred to Euoplocephalus tutus, as well as specimens that were previously referred to Euoplocephalus but subsequently were assigned to different genera, is published by Arbour & Currie (2013).

=== New taxa ===
Name	Novelty	Status	Authors	Age	Unit	Location	Notes	Images
Acheroraptor	Gen. et sp. nov	Valid	Evans, Larson & Currie	Late Cretaceous (latest Maastrichtian)	Hell Creek Formation	United States	A dromaeosaurid. The type species is Acheroraptor temertyorum.	
Acrotholus	Gen. et sp. nov	Valid	Evans et al.	Late Cretaceous (Santonian)		Canada	A pachycephalosaurid. The type species is Acrotholus audeti.	
Ajancingenia	Nom. nov	Valid	Easter	Late Cretaceous		Mongolia	A member of Oviraptoridae; a replacement name for Ingenia Barsbold (1981). Funston et al. (2018) considered this genus to be a junior synonym of the genus Heyuannia.	
Albertadromeus	Gen. et sp. nov	Valid	Brown et al.	Late Cretaceous (Campanian)	Oldman Formation	Canada	A relative of Orodromeus, Oryctodromeus and Zephyrosaurus. The type species is Albertadromeus syntarsus.	
Aorun	Gen. et sp. nov	Valid	Choiniere et al.	Middle or Late Jurassic (Callovian/Oxfordian boundary, more likely Callovian)	Shishugou Formation	China	A coelurosaur theropod, more closely related to ornithomimosaurs and maniraptorans than to tyrannosauroids. The type species is Aorun zhaoi.	
Aurornis	Gen. et sp. nov	Valid	Godefroit et al.	Middle or Late Jurassic	Tiaojishan Formation	China	A basal member of Avialae or a troodontid. The type species is Aurornis xui.	
Brasilotitan	Gen. et sp. nov.	Valid	Machado et al.	Late Cretaceous	Adamantina Formation	Brazil	A titanosaur. The type species is Brasilotitan nemophagus.	
Bravoceratops	Gen. et sp. nov	Valid	Wick & Lehman	Late Cretaceous (early Maastrichtian)	Javelina Formation	United States	A chasmosaurine ceratopsian. The type species is Bravoceratops polyphemus.	
Canardia	Gen. et sp. nov	Valid	Prieto-Márquez et al.	Late Cretaceous (late Maastrichtian)	Marnes d'Auzas Formation	France	A lambeosaurine hadrosaurid related to Aralosaurus. The type species is Canardia garonnensis.	
Dahalokely	Gen. et sp. nov	Valid	Farke & Sertich	Late Cretaceous (Turonian)		Madagascar	An abelisauroid theropod. The type species is Dahalokely tokana.	
Dongyangopelta	Gen. et sp. nov	Valid	Chen et al.	Cretaceous (Albian or Cenomanian)	Chaochuan Formation	China	A nodosaurid. The type species is Dongyangopelta yangyanensis.	
Eosinopteryx	Gen. et sp. nov	Valid	Godefroit et al.	Middle or Late Jurassic	Tiaojishan Formation	China	A member of Paraves. The type species is Eosinopteryx brevipenna.	
Europelta	Gen. et sp. nov	Valid	Kirkland et al.	Early Cretaceous (early Albian)	Escucha Formation	Spain	A nodosaurid. The type species is Europelta carbonensis.	
Gannansaurus	Gen. et sp. nov	Valid	Lü et al.	Late Cretaceous	Nanxiong Formation	China	A sauropod, a member of Somphospondyli. The type species is Gannansaurus sinensis.	
Ganzhousaurus	Gen. et sp. nov	Valid	Wang et al.	Late Cretaceous	Nanxiong Formation	China	An oviraptorid. The type species is Ganzhousaurus nankangensis.	
Jianchangosaurus	Gen. et sp. nov	Valid	Pu et al.	Early Cretaceous	Yixian Formation	China	A therizinosaur. The type species is Jianchangosaurus yixianensis.	
Jiangxisaurus	Gen. et sp. nov	Valid	Wei et al.	Late Cretaceous	Nanxiong Formation	China	An oviraptorid theropod. The type species is Jiangxisaurus ganzhouensis.	
Judiceratops	Gen. et sp. nov	Valid	Longrich	Late Cretaceous (middle Campanian)	Judith River Formation	United States	A chasmosaurine ceratopsian. The type species is Judiceratops tigris.	
Juratyrant	Gen. et comb. nov	Valid	Brusatte & Benson	Late Jurassic (Tithonian)	Kimmeridge Clay	United Kingdom	A basal tyrannosauroid, a new genus for "Stokesosaurus" langhami (Benson, 2008).	
Katepensaurus	Gen. et sp. nov	Valid	Ibiricu et al.	Late Cretaceous (Cenomanian or Turonian)	Bajo Barreal Formation	Argentina	A rebbachisaurid sauropod. The type species is Katepensaurus goicoecheai.	
Kazaklambia	Gen. et comb. nov	Valid	Bell & Brink	Late Cretaceous (Santonian)		Kazakhstan	A lambeosaurine hadrosaurid, a new genus for "Procheneosaurus" convincens.	
Leptorhynchos	Gen. et sp. nov	Valid	Longrich et al.	Late Cretaceous (late Campanian)	Aguja Formation	United States	A caenagnathid oviraptorosaur. The type species is Leptorhynchos gaddisi. Originally genus also contained "Ornithomimus" elegans Parks (1933), but this species was subsequently transferred to the separate genus Citipes.	
Lythronax	Gen. et sp. nov	Valid	Loewen et al.	Late Cretaceous (middle Campanian)	Wahweap Formation	United States	A tyrannosaurine tyrannosaurid. The type species is Lythronax argestes.	
Nankangia	Gen. et sp. nov	Valid	Lü et al.	Late Cretaceous	Nanxiong Formation	China	An oviraptorosaur. The type species is Nankangia jiangxiensis.	
Nasutoceratops	Gen. et sp. nov.	Valid	Sampson et al.	Late Cretaceous (late Campanian)	Kaiparowits Formation	United States	A centrosaurine ceratopsian. The type species is Nasutoceratops titusi.	
Normanniasaurus	Gen. et sp. nov	Valid	Le Loeuff, Suteethorn & Buffetaut	Early Cretaceous (Albian)		France	A basal member of Titanosauria. The type species is Normanniasaurus genceyi.	
Nyasasaurus	Gen. et sp. nov	Valid	Nesbitt et al.	Middle Triassic (late Anisian)	Manda Formation	Tanzania	The oldest known dinosaur or the sister taxon of the Dinosauria. The type species is Nyasasaurus parringtoni.	
Oohkotokia	Gen. et sp. nov	Valid	Penkalski	Late Cretaceous (late Campanian)	Two Medicine Formation	United States	An ankylosaurine ankylosaurid. The type species is Oohkotokia horneri. The species was subsequently argued by Arbour and Currie (2013) to be a junior synonym of Scolosaurus cutleri.	
Overosaurus	Gen. et sp. nov	Valid	Coria et al.	Late Cretaceous (Campanian)	Anacleto Formation	Argentina	A lithostrotian titanosaur related to Aeolosaurus. The type species is Overosaurus paradasorum.	
Saurolophus morrisi	Sp. nov	Valid	Prieto-Márquez & Wagner	Late Cretaceous (Maastrichtian)	Moreno Formation	USA	Originally described as a species of Saurolophus; subsequently made the type species of a separate genus Augustynolophus by Prieto-Márquez et al. (2015).	
Sauroniops	Gen. et sp. nov	Valid	Cau, Dalla Vecchia & Fabbri	Cenomanian	Kem Kem Beds	Morocco	A carcharodontosaurid. The type species is Sauroniops pachytholus. Announced in 2012; the final version of the article naming it was published in 2013.	
Siats	Gen. et sp. nov	Valid	Zanno & Makovicky	Late Cretaceous (Cenomanian)	Cedar Mountain Formation	United States	A Neovenatorid theropod. The type species is Siats meekerorum.	
Taohelong	Gen. et sp. nov	Valid	Yang et al.	Early Cretaceous	Hekou Group	China	A member of Polacanthinae. The type species is Taohelong jinchengensis	
Tataouinea	Gen. et sp. nov.	Valid	Fanti et al.	Early Cretaceous	Ain el Guettar Formation	Tunisia	A rebbachisaurid sauropod. The type species is Tataouinea hannibalis.	
Trinisaura	Gen. et sp. nov	Valid	Coria et al.	Late Cretaceous (Campanian)	Snow Hill Island Formation	Antarctica	An ornithopod dinosaur. The type species is Trinisaura santamartaensis.	
Wulatelong	Gen. et sp. nov	Valid	Xu et al.	Late Cretaceous (Campanian)	Wulansuhai Formation	China	An oviraptorid. The type species is Wulatelong gobiensis.	
Xinjiangtitan	Gen. et sp. nov	Valid	Wu et al.	Middle Jurassic	Qigu Formation	China	A sauropod related to Mamenchisaurus. The type species is Xinjiangtitan shanshanesis.	
Yulong	Gen. et sp. nov	Valid	Lü et al.	Late Cretaceous	Qiupa Formation	China	An oviraptorid theropod dinosaur. The type species is Yulong mini.	
Yunganglong	Gen. et sp. nov	Valid	Wang et al.	Early Late Cretaceous	Zhumapu Formation	China	A basal member of Hadrosauroidea. The type species is Yunganglong datongensis.	
Yunmenglong	Gen. et sp. nov	Valid	Lü et al.	Early Cretaceous	Haoling Formation	China	A titanosauriform sauropod. The type species is Yunmenglong ruyangensis.	

== Birds ==
=== Research ===
- Eleutherornis is re-examined and classified as a member of Phorusrhacidae by Angst et al. (2013).

=== New taxa ===
Name	Novelty	Status	Authors	Age	Unit	Location	Notes	Images
Acrocephalus kordosi	Sp. nov.	Valid	Jenö Kessler	Pliocene	MN 15–16	Hungary	An Acrocephalidae.	
Acrocephalus kretzoii	Sp. nov.	Valid	Jenö Kessler	Pliocene	MN 15–16	Hungary	An Acrocephalidae.	
Acrocephalus major	Sp. nov.	Valid	Jenö Kessler	Late Miocene	MN 13	Hungary	An Acrocephalidae.	
Acrocephalus minor	Sp. nov.	Valid	Jenö Kessler	Late Miocene	MN 13	Hungary	An Acrocephalidae.	
Aegithalos congruis	Sp. nov.	Valid	Jenö Kessler	Pliocene	MN 15–16	Hungary	An Aegithalidae.	
Aegithalos gaspariki	Sp. nov.	Valid	Jenö Kessler	Late Miocene	MN 13	Hungary	An Aegithalidae.	
Aethia barnesi	Sp. nov.	Valid	N. Adam Smith	Late Miocene	San Mateo Formation	USA: California:	An Alcidae.	
Aethia storeri	Sp. nov.	Valid	N. Adam Smith	Pliocene	Blancan, San Diego Formation	USA: California	An Alcidae, auklet, a species of Aethia.	
Agapornis attenboroughi	Sp. nov.	Valid	Albrecht Manegold	Early Pliocene	Varswater Formation	South Africa	A Psittacidae.	
Alauda tivadari	Sp. nov.	Valid	Jenö Kessler	Late Miocene	MN 13	Hungary	An Alaudidae.	
Anas denesi	Sp. nov.	Valid	Jenö Kessler	Late Miocene	MN 13	Hungary	A member of Anatidae. Originally described as a species of Anas; Zelenkov (2016) transferred the species to the genus Aythya.	
Anthus baranensis	Sp. nov.	Valid	Jenö Kessler	Pliocene	MN 15–16	Hungary	A Motacillidae.	
Anthus híri	Sp. nov.	Valid	Jenö Kessler	Late Miocene	MN 13	Hungary	A Motacillidae.	
Aquila kurochkini	Sp. nov	Valid	Zlatozar N. Boev	Late Pliocene	Middle Villafranchian	Bulgaria	An Accipitridae.	
Asphaltoglaux cecileae	Gen. nov. et Sp. nov.	Valid	Campbell & Bocheński	Late Pleistocene	La Brea Tar Pits	USA: California	A Strigidae, this is the type species of the new genus.	
Bimbisula melanodactylos	Gen. et sp. nov.	Valid	Benson & Erickson	Pliocene	Goose Creek Limestone	United States (South Carolina)	A member of the family Sulidae. The type species of the new genus.	
Bombycilla brevia	Sp. nov.	Valid	Jenö Kessler	Late Miocene	MN 13	Hungary	A Bombycillidae.	
Bombycilla kubinyii	Sp. nov.	Valid	Jenö Kessler	Pliocene	MN 15–16	Hungary	A Bombycillidae.	
Calandrella gali	Sp. nov.	Valid	Jenö Kessler	Late Miocene	MN 13	Hungary	An Alaudidae.	
Caracara major	Sp. nov.	Valid	Washington Jones Andrés Rinderknecht Rafael Migot R. Ernesto Blanco	Late Pleistocene	Rio de la Plata Estuary	Uruguay	A Falconidae.	
Carduelis kretzoii	Sp. nov.	Valid	Jenö Kessler	Late Miocene	MN 13	Hungary	A Fringillidae, Carduelinae.	
Carduelis lambrechti	Sp. nov.	Valid	Jenö Kessler	Late Miocene	MN 13	Hungary	A Fringillidae, Carduelinae.	
Carduelis medius	Sp. nov.	Valid	Jenö Kessler	Pliocene	MN 15–16	Hungary	A Fringillidae, Carduelinae.	
Carduelis parvulus	Sp. nov.	Valid	Jenö Kessler	Pliocene	MN 15–16	Hungary	A Fringillidae, Carduelinae.	
Certhia immensa	Sp. nov.	Valid	Jenö Kessler	Pliocene	MN 15–16	Hungary	A Certhiidae.	
Cettia janossyi	Sp. nov.	Valid	Jenö Kessler	Late Miocene	MN 13	Hungary	A Cettiidae.	
Cettia kalmani	Sp. nov.	Valid	Jenö Kessler	Pliocene	MN 15–16	Hungary	A Cettiidae.	
Chambicuculus pusillus	Gen. nov. et Sp. nov.	Valid	Cécile Mourer-Chauviré Rodolphe Tabuce El Mabrouk Essid Laurent Marivaux Hayet Khayati Monique Vianey-Liaud Mustapha Ben Haj Ali	Eocene	Djebel Chambi	Tunisia	A basal Cuculidae.	
Chambiortyx cristata	Gen. nov. et Sp. nov.	Valid	Cécile Mourer-Chauviré Rodolphe Tabuce El Mabrouk Essid Laurent Marivaux Hayet Khayati Monique Vianey-Liaud Mustapha Ben Haj Ali	Eocene	Djebel Chambi	Tunisia	A basal Galliformes. The type species of the genus.	
Changmaornis houi	Gen. nov. et Sp. nov.	Valid	Ya-Ming Wang Jingmai O'Connor Da-Qing Li Hai-Lu You	Early Cretaceous	Aptian, Xiagou Formation	China	A basal member of the Ornithuromorpha. The type species of the new genus.	
Cinclus gaspariki	Sp. nov.	Valid	Jenö Kessler	Late Miocene	MN 13	Hungary	A Cinclidae.	
Cinclus minor	Sp. nov.	Valid	Jenö Kessler	Pliocene	MN 15–16	Hungary	A Cinclidae.	
Coccothraustes major	Sp. nov.	Valid	Jenö Kessler	Pliocene	MN 15–16	Hungary	A Fringillidae, Carduelinae.	
Coenocorypha neocaledonica	Sp. nov	Valid	Trevor H. Worthy Atholl Anderson Christophe Sand	Late Holocene	Cave deposits	New Caledonia	A Scolopacidae.	
Colaptes oceanicus	Sp. nov.	Valid	Storrs L. Olson	Pleistocene to Holocene	Cave deposits	Bermuda	A Picidae.	
Delichon major	Sp. nov.	Valid	Jenö Kessler	Pliocene	MN 15–16	Hungary	A Hirundinidae.	
Delichon polgardiensis	Sp. nov.	Valid	Jenö Kessler	Late Miocene	MN 13	Hungary	A Hirundinidae.	
Delichon pusillus	Sp. nov.	Valid	Jenö Kessler	Pliocene	MN 15–16	Hungary	A Hirundinidae.	
Divisulcus demerei	Gen. nov. et Sp. nov.	Valid	N. Adam Smith	Middle Miocene (~14–16 Mya)	Rosarito Beach Formation	Mexico	A Charadriiformes related to the Alcidae. The type species of the new genus.	
Emberiza gaspariki	Sp. nov.	Valid	Jenö Kessler	Pliocene	MN 15–16	Hungary	An Emberizidae.	
Emberiza media	Sp. nov.	Valid	Jenö Kessler	Pliocene	MN 15–16	Hungary	An Emberizidae.	
Emberiza pannonica	Sp. nov.	Valid	Jenö Kessler	Late Miocene	MN 13	Hungary	An Emberizidae.	
Emberiza parva	Sp. nov.	Valid	Jenö Kessler	Pliocene	MN 15–16	Hungary	An Emberizidae.	
Emberiza polgardiensis	Sp. nov.	Valid	Jenö Kessler	Late Miocene	MN 13	Hungary	An Emberizidae.	
Eocypselus rowei	Sp. nov.	Valid	Daniel T. Ksepka Julia A. Clarke Sterling J. Nesbitt Felicia B. Kulp Lance Grande	Early Eocene	Green River Formation	USA: Wyoming	An Apodiformes, basal Hemiprocni Karkhu, 1992, Eocypselidae Harrison, 1984.	
Erithacus minor	Sp. nov.	Valid	Jenö Kessler	Pliocene	MN 15–16	Hungary	A Muscicapidae.	
Fringilla kormosi	Sp. nov.	Valid	Jenö Kessler	Late Miocene	MN 15–16	Hungary	A Fringillidae, Fringillinae.	
Fringilla petenyii	Sp. nov.	Valid	Jenö Kessler	Pliocene	MN 15–16	Hungary	A Fringillidae, Fringillinae.	
Galerida pannonica	Sp. nov.	Valid	Jenö Kessler	Pliocene	MN 15–16	Hungary	An Alaudidae.	
Gerandibis paganus	Gen. nov. et Comb. nov.	Valid	Vanesa L. De Pietri	Early Miocene	Aquitanian, MN 1–2	France	A Threskiornithidae, a new genus for "Ibis" pagana Milne-Edwards (1868), the type species of the new genus with which it creates a Comb. nov.	
Glaucidium kurochkini	Sp. nov.	Valid	Kenneth E. Campbell, Jr. Zbigniew M. Bocheński	Late Pleistocene	La Brea Tar Pits	USA: California	A Strigidae.	
Gobipipus reshetovi	Gen. nov. et Sp. nov.	Valid	Evgeny N. Kurochkin Sankar Chatterjee Konstantin Y. Mikhailov	Late Cretaceous	Campanian Barun Goyot Formation	Mongolia	An Enantiornithes Walker, 1981, this is the type species of the new genus.	
Hippolais veterior	Sp. nov.	Valid	Jenö Kessler	Late Miocene	MN 13	Hungary	An Acrocephalidae.	
Hirundo gracilis	Sp. nov.	Valid	Jenö Kessler	Late Miocene	MN 13	Hungary	A Hirundinidae.	
Hirundo major	Sp. nov.	Valid	Jenö Kessler	Pliocene	MN 15–16	Hungary	A Hirundinidae.	
Jiuquanornis niui	Gen. nov. et Sp. nov.	Valid	Ya-Ming Wang Jingmai O'Connor Da-Qing Li Hai-Lu You	Early Cretaceous	Xiagou Formation	China	A basal member of Ornithuromorpha. This is the type species of the new genus.	
Khwenena leopoldinae	Gen. nov. et Sp. nov.	Valid	Albrecht Manegold	Early Pliocene	Varswater Formation	South Africa	A Psittacidae. The type species of the new genus.	
Kurrartapu johnnguyeni	Gen. nov. et Sp. nov.	Valid	Jacqueline M. T. Nguyen Trevor H. Worthy Walter E. Boles Suzanne J. Hand Michael Archer	Early Miocene	Riversleigh	Australia: Queensland	A Cracticidae. The type species of the new genus.	
Lanius capeki	Sp. nov.	Valid	Jenö Kessler	Late Miocene	MN 13	Hungary	A Laniidae.	
Lanius hungaricus	Sp. nov.	Valid	Jenö Kessler	Pliocene	MN 15–16	Hungary	A Laniidae.	
Lanius intermedius	Sp. nov.	Valid	Jenö Kessler	Pliocene	MN 15–16	Hungary	A Laniidae.	
Lanius major	Sp. nov.	Valid	Jenö Kessler	Pliocene	MN 15–16	Hungary	A Laniidae.	
Locustella janossyi	Sp. nov.	Valid	Jenö Kessler	Pliocene	MN 15–16	Hungary	A Locustellidae.	
Locustella kordosi	Sp. nov.	Valid	Jenö Kessler	Late Miocene	MN 13	Hungary	A Locustellidae.	
Locustella magna	Sp. nov.	Valid	Jenö Kessler	Pliocene	MN 15–16	Hungary	A Locustellidae.	
Loxia csarnotanus	Sp. nov.	Valid	Jenö Kessler	Pliocene	MN 15–16	Hungary	A Fringillidae, Carduelinae.	
Lullula minor	Sp. nov.	Valid	Jenö Kessler	Late Miocene	MN 13	Hungary	An Alaudidae.	
Lullula minuscula	Sp. nov.	Valid	Jenö Kessler	Pliocene	MN 15–16	Hungary	An Alaudidae.	
Lullula parva	Sp. nov.	Valid	Jenö Kessler	Pliocene	MN 15–16	Hungary	An Alaudidae.	
Luscinia denesi	Sp. nov.	Valid	Jenö Kessler	Late Miocene	MN 13	Hungary	A Muscicapidae.	
Luscinia pliocaenica	Sp. nov.	Valid	Jenö Kessler	Pliocene	MN 15–16	Hungary	A Muscicapidae.	
Melanocorypha minor	Sp. nov.	Valid	Jenö Kessler	Pliocene	MN 15–16	Hungary	An Alaudidae.	
Miocoracias chenevali	Gen. nov. et Sp. nov.	Valid	Cécile Mourer-Chauviré Jean-Baptiste Peyrouse Marguerite Hugueney	Early Miocene	Agenian Saint-Gérard-le-Puy, MN 2a	France	A Coraciidae.	
Miotyto montispetrosi	Gen. nov. et Sp. nov.	Valid	Ursula B. Göhlich Peter Ballmann	Middle Miocene	MN 6	Germany Bavaria	A Tytonidae. The type species of the new genus.	
Monticola pongraczi	Sp. nov.	Valid	Jenö Kessler	Pliocene	MN 15–16	Hungary	A Muscicapidae.	
Motacilla intermedia	Sp. nov.	Valid	Jenö Kessler	Late Miocene	MN 13	Hungary	A Muscicapidae.	
Motacilla minor	Sp. nov.	Valid	Jenö Kessler	Pliocene	MN 15–16	Hungary	A Motacillidae.	
Motacilla robusta	Sp. nov.	Valid	Jenö Kessler	Pliocene	MN 15–16	Hungary	A Motacillidae.	
Muscicapa miklosi	Sp. nov.	Valid	Jenö Kessler	Late Miocene	MN 13	Hungary	A Muscicapidae.	
Muscicapa petényii	Sp. nov.	Not Valid	Jenö Kessler	Pliocene	MN 15–16	Hungary	A Muscicapidae. The name is not valid because the "é" in the species name should be a plain "e".	
Oenanthe kormosi	Sp. nov.	Valid	Jenö Kessler	Late Miocene	MN 13	Hungary	A Muscicapidae.	
Oenanthe pongraczi	Sp. nov.	Valid	Jenö Kessler	Pliocene	MN 15–16	Hungary	A Muscicapidae.	
Oligocolius psittacocephalon	Sp. nov.	Valid	Gerald Mayr	Late Oligocene	MP 28	Germany: Rhineland-Palatinate	A Coliidae.	
?Oligostrix bergeri	Sp. nov.	Valid	Vanessa De Pietri Cécile Mourer-Chauviré Ursula Menkveld-Gfeller Christian A. Meyer Loïc Costeur	Late Oligocene	MP 26	Switzerland	A Strigidormes, Protostrigidae Wetmore, 1933, possibly a species of Oligostrix Fischer, 1983.	
Oriolus beremendensis	Sp. nov.	Valid	Jenö Kessler	Pliocene	MN 15–16	Hungary	An Oriolidae.	
Otis hellenica	Sp. nov.	Valid	Zlatozar Boev Georgios Lazaridis Evangelia Tsoukala	Late Miocene	Middle-Late Turolian, MN12-13	Greece	Originally classified as a member of Otididae. Zelenkov, Boev & Lazaridis (2016) reinterpreted it as a member of Gruiformes belonging to the family Eogruidae and the subfamily Ergilornithinae; the authors considered it to be a possible member of the genus Amphipelargus of uncertain specific assignment.	
Otus frutuosoi	Sp. nov.	Valid	Juan C. Rando Josep A. Alcover Storrs L. Olson Harald Pieper	Quaternary	1790 ± 40 BP	Portugal: Azores	A Strigidae.	
Palaelodus kurochkini	Sp. nov	Valid	Nikita V. Zelenkov	Middle Miocene	Ooshin Formation	Mongolia	A Phoenicopteriformes, Palaelodidae Stejneger, 1885.	
Parus medius	Sp. nov.	Valid	Jenö Kessler	Pliocene	MN 15–16	Hungary	A Paridae.	
Parus parvulus	Sp. nov.	Valid	Jenö Kessler	Pliocene	MN 15–16	Hungary	A Paridae.	
Parus robustus	Sp. nov.	Valid	Jenö Kessler	Pliocene	MN 15–16	Hungary	A Paridae.	
Passer híri	Sp. nov.	Valid	Jenö Kessler	Late Miocene	MN 13	Hungary	A Passeridae.	
Passer minusculus	Sp. nov.	Valid	Jenö Kessler	Pliocene	MN 15–16	Hungary	A Passeridae.	
Passer pannonicus	Sp. nov.	Valid	Jenö Kessler	Pliocene	MN 15–16	Hungary	A Passeridae.	
Pastushkinia zazhigini	Gen. nov. et Comb. nov.	Valid	Nikita V. Zelenkov	Early Pliocene	Hyargas-Nuur Formation	Mongolia	A Rallidae; a new genus for "Crex" zazhigini Kurochkin (1980), creating a Comb. nov.	
Phoenicurus baranensis	Sp. nov.	Valid	Jenö Kessler	Pliocene	MN 15–16	Hungary	A Muscicapidae.	
Phoenicurus erikai	Sp. nov.	Valid	Jenö Kessler	Pliocene	MN 15–16	Hungary	A Muscicapidae.	
Phylloscopus pliocaenicus	Sp. nov.	Valid	Jenö Kessler	Pliocene	MN 15–16	Hungary	A Phylloscopidae.	
Phylloscopus venczeli	Sp. nov.	Valid	Jenö Kessler	Late Miocene	MN 13	Hungary	A Phylloscopidae.	
Picus pliocaenicus	Sp. nov.	Valid	Jenö Kessler	Pliocene	MN 15–16	Hungary	A Picidae.	
Pikaihao bartlei	Gen. nov. et Sp. nov.	Valid	Trevor H. Worthy Jennifer P. Worthy Alan J. D. Tennyson R. Paul Scofield	Early Miocene (19–16 Mya)	Bannockburn Formation	New Zealand	An Ardeidae. This is the type species of the new genus.	
Pinicola kubinyii	Sp. nov.	Valid	Jenö Kessler	Pliocene	MN 15–16	Hungary	A Fringillidaem, Carduelinae.	
Plectrophenax veterior	Sp. nov.	Valid	Jenö Kessler	Late Miocene	MN 13	Hungary	A Calcariidae.	
Proapteryx micromeros	Gen. nov. et Sp. nov.	Valid	Trevor H. Worthy Jennifer P. Worthy Alan J. D. Tennyson Steven W. Salisbury Suzanne J. Hand R. Paul Scofield	Early Miocene	Altonian; 19–16 Ma Bannockburn Formation	New Zealand	An Apterygidae. The type species of the new genus.	
Prunella freudenthali	Sp. nov.	Valid	Jenö Kessler	Late Miocene	MN 13	Hungary	A Prunellidae.	
Prunella kormosi	Sp. nov.	Valid	Jenö Kessler	Pliocene	MN 15–16	Hungary	A Prunellidae.	
Pyrrhula gali	Sp. nov.	Valid	Jenö Kessler	Late Miocene	MN 13	Hungary	A Fringillidae, Carduelinae.	
Pyrrhula minor	Sp. nov.	Valid	Jenö Kessler	Pliocene	MN 15–16	Hungary	A Fringillidae, Carduelinae.	
Qianshanornis rapax	Gen. nov. et Sp. nov.	Valid	Gerald Mayr Yang Jian Eric De Bast Li Cheng-Sen Thierry Smith	Middle Paleocene	Wanghudun Formation	China	A bird of uncertain phylogenetic placement, but placed in a new family: Qianshanornithidae fam. nov. Mayr, Yang, De Bast, Li et Smith, 2013, most closely resembling Strigogyps Gaillard, 1908, Ameghinornithidae Mourer-Chauviré, 1981. The type species of the new genus.	
Rallus cyanocavi	Sp. nov	Valid	David W. Steadman J. R. Morris N. A. Wright	Late Pleistocene	Underwater Cave	The Bahamas	A Rallidae.	
Regulus pliocaenicus	Sp. nov.	Valid	Jenö Kessler	Pliocene	MN 15–16	Hungary	A Regulidae.	
Resoviaornis jamrozi	Gen. nov. et Sp. nov.	Valid	Zbigniew M. Bocheński Teresa Tomek Krzysztof Wertz Ewa Świdnicka	Oligocene	Late Rupelian, 29–28,5 Mya, Menilite Formation	Poland	A Passeriformes. The type species of the new genus.	
Riparia minor	Sp. nov.	Valid	Jenö Kessler	Late Miocene	MN 13	Hungary	A Hirundinidae.	
?Rupelrallus belgicus	Sp. nov	Valid	Gerald Mayr	Early Oligocene	Rupelian, Boom Clay	Belgium: Antwerp	A Gruiformes, Parvigruidae Mayr, 2005.	
Saintandrea chenoides	Gen. nov. et Sp. nov.	Valid	Gerald Mayr Vanesa L. De Pietri	Late Oligocene	Early Chattian, MP 26	France	An Anatidae, Romainvilliinae Lambrecht, 1933. The type species of the new genus.	
Saxicola baranensis	Sp. nov.	Valid	Jenö Kessler	Pliocene	MN 15–16	Hungary	A Muscicapidae.	
Saxicola lambrechti	Sp. nov.	Valid	Jenö Kessler	Late Miocene	MN 13	Hungary	A Muscicapidae.	
Saxicola magna	Sp. nov.	Valid	Jenö Kessler	Pliocene	MN 15–16	Hungary	A Muscicapidae.	
Saxicola parva	Sp. nov.	Valid	Jenö Kessler	Pliocene	MN 15–16	Hungary	A Muscicapidae.	
Scandiavis mikkelseni	Gen. nov. et Sp. nov.	Valid	Sara Bertelli Bent E. K. Lindow Gareth J. Dyke Gerald Mayr	Early Eocene	Fur Formation	Denmark	A Neognathae related to the Charadriiformes. The type species of the new genus.	
Sitta gracilis	Sp. nov.	Valid	Jenö Kessler	Late Miocene	MN 13	Hungary	A Sittidae.	
Sitta pusilla	Sp. nov.	Not Valid, Junior homonym	Jenö Kessler	Pliocene	MN 15–16	Hungary	A Sittidae; the name is preoccupied, a junior homonym of the brown-headed nuthatch, Sitta pusilla Latham, 1790. In the article describing the taxon its name is spelled Sitta pusilla or Sitta pussila on different pages.	
Sitta villanyensis	Sp. nov.	Valid	Jenö Kessler	Pliocene	MN 15–16	Hungary	A Sittidae.	
Sturnus baranensis	Sp. nov.	Valid	Jenö Kessler	Pliocene	MN 15–16	Hungary	A Sturnidae.	
Sturnus brevis	Sp. nov.	Valid	Jenö Kessler	Late Miocene	MN 13	Hungary	A Sturnidae.	
Sturnus pliocaenicus	Sp. nov.	Valid	Jenö Kessler	Pliocene	MN 15–16	Hungary	A Sturnidae.	
Sulcavis geeorum	Gen. nov. et Sp. nov.	Valid	Jingmai K. O'Connor Zhang Yuguang Luis M. Chiappe Meng Qingjin Li Quanguo Di Liu	Early Cretaceous	Yixian Formation	China	An Enantiornithes Walker, 1981. The type species the new genus.	
Sylvia intermedia	Sp. nov.	Valid	Jenö Kessler	Late Miocene	MN 13	Hungary	A Sylviidae.	
Sylvia pussila	Sp. nov.	Valid	Jenö Kessler	Pliocene	MN 15–16	Hungary	A Sylviidae.	
Tichodroma capeki	Sp. nov.	Valid	Jenö Kessler	Late Miocene	MN 13	Hungary	A Tichodromidae.	
Troglodytes robustus	Sp. nov.	Valid	Jenö Kessler	Late Miocene	MN 13	Hungary	A Troglodytidae.	
Turdicus pannonicus	Sp. nov.	Valid	Jenö Kessler	Late Miocene	MN 13	Hungary	A Turdidae.	
Turdus major	Sp. nov.	Valid	Jenö Kessler	Pliocene	MN 15–16	Hungary	A Turdidae.	
Turdus medius	Sp. nov.	Valid	Jenö Kessler	Pliocene	MN 15–16	Hungary	A Turdidae.	
Turdus minor	Sp. nov.	Valid	Jenö Kessler	Pliocene	MN 15–16	Hungary	A Turdidae.	
Turdus miocaenicus	Sp. nov.	Valid	Jenö Kessler	Late Miocene	MN 13	Hungary	A Turdidae.	
Turdus polgardiensis	Sp. nov.	Valid	Jenö Kessler	Late Miocene	MN 13	Hungary	A Turdidae.	
Vadaravis brownae	Gen. nov. et Sp. nov.	Valid	Nathan D. Smith Lance Grande Julia A. Clarke	Late early Eocene	Green River Formation	USA: Wyoming	A possible relative of the Threskiornithidae. The type species of the new genus.	
Wilaru tedfordi	Gen. nov. et Sp. nov.	Valid	Walter E. Boles Melanie A. Finch Rene H. Hofheins Patricia Vickers-Rich Mary Walters Thomas H. Rich	Late Oligocene or Early Miocene (26–24 mya)	Namba Formation	Australia: South Australia	Initially thought to be a stone-curlew (a member of Burhinidae); subsequently argued to be a member of Presbyornithidae by De Pietri et al. (2016). The type species of the new genus.	
Xinghaiornis lini	Gen. nov. et Sp. nov.	Valid	Wang Xuri Luis M. Chiappe Teng Fangfang Ji Qiang	Early Cretaceous	Yixian Formation	China	An early member of the Ornithothoraces of uncertain phylogenetic placement. The type species of the new genus.	
Yanornis guozhangi	Sp. nov	Valid	Wang Xu-ri Ji Qiang Teng Fang-fang Jin Ke-mo	Early Cretaceous	Yixian Formation	China	An Ornithuromorphae Chiappe, Ji, Ji et Norell, 1999, Yanornithiformes Zhou et Zhang, 2001, Yanornithidae Zhou et Zhang, 2001	
Yumenornis huangi	Gen. nov. et Sp. nov.	Valid	Wang Ya-Ming Jingmai O'Connor Li Da-Qing You Hai-Lu	Early Cretaceous	Xiagou Formation	China	A basal member of the Ornithuromorpha. The type species of new genus Yumenornis .	
Zhouornis hani	Gen. nov. et Sp. nov.	Valid	Zhang Zihui Luis M. Chiappe Han Gang Anusuya Chinsamy	Early Cretaceous	Possibly Jiufotang Formation	China	A member of the Enantiornithes Walker, 1981. The type species of the new genus.	

== Newly named pterosaurs ==
Name	Novelty	Status	Authors	Age	Unit	Location	Notes	Images
Alamodactylus	Gen. et sp. nov	Valid	Andres & Myers	Late Cretaceous (early Coniacian)	Atco Formation	United States	A non-pteranodontoid pteranodontian. The type species is Alamodactylus byrdi.	
Ardeadactylus	Gen. et comb. nov	Valid	Bennett	Late Jurassic		Germany	A new genus for "Pterodactylus" longicollum von Meyer (1854).	
Camposipterus	Gen. et comb. nov	Valid	Rodrigues & Kellner	Early Cretaceous (Albian)	Cambridge Greensand	United Kingdom	A new genus for "Ornithocheirus" nasutus Seeley (1870); genus might also contain "Ornithocheirus" colorhinus Seeley (1870). Rodrigues & Kellner (2013) also considered it possible that "Pterodactylus" sedgwickii Owen (1859) belonged to the genus Camposipterus, but subsequently it was made the type species of a separate genus Aerodraco.	
Caupedactylus	Gen. et sp. nov	Valid	Kellner	Early Cretaceous	Romualdo Formation	Brazil	A tapejarid. The type species is Caupedactylus ybaka.	
Cimoliopterus	Gen. et comb. nov	Valid	Rodrigues & Kellner	Late Cretaceous (Cenomanian/Turonian)	Chalk Formation	United Kingdom	A new genus for "Pterodactylus" cuvieri Bowerbank (1851).	
Cuspicephalus	Gen. et sp. nov	Valid	Martill & Etches	Kimmeridgian	Kimmeridge Clay Formation	United Kingdom	A basal monofenestratan. The type species is Cuspicephalus scarfi.	
Eurazhdarcho	Gen. et sp. nov	Valid	Vremir et al.	Late Cretaceous (early Maastrichtian)	Sebeş Formation	Romania	An azhdarchid. The type species is Eurazhdarcho langendorfensis.	
Lonchodraco	Gen. et comb. nov	Valid	Rodrigues & Kellner	Cretaceous (Albian to Cenomanian/Turonian)	Cambridge Greensand; Chalk Formation	United Kingdom	A new genus for "Pterodactylus" giganteus Bowerbank (1846); genus also contains "Ornithocheirus" machaerorhynchus Seeley (1870) and "Ornithocheirus" microdon Seeley (1870).	
Radiodactylus	Gen. et sp. nov	Valid	Andres & Myers	Early Cretaceous (late Aptian or early Albian)	Glen Rose Formation	United States	A non-azhdarchid azhdarchoid. The type species is Radiodactylus langstoni.	
Vectidraco	Gen. et sp. nov	Valid	Naish, Simpson & Dyke	Early Cretaceous (probably early Aptian)		United Kingdom	An azhdarchoid. The type species is Vectidraco daisymorrisae.	
Wenupteryx	Gen. et sp. nov	Valid	Codorniú & Gasparini	Late Jurassic (Tithonian)	Vaca Muerta Formation	Argentina	A pterodactyloid pterosaur related to the clade Euctenochasmatia or Archaeopterodactyloidea. The type species is Wenupteryx uzi.	
