= Saxicola lambrechti =

Saxicola lambrechti Temporal range: Late Miocene

Scientific classification
- Kingdom: Animalia
- Phylum: Chordata
- Class: Aves
- Order: Passeriformes
- Family: Muscicapidae
- Genus: Saxicola
- Species: †S. lambrechti

Binomial name
- †Saxicola lambrechti Kessler, 2013

Extinct species of bird

Saxicola lambrechti is an extinct species of Saxicola that inhabited Hungary during the Neogene period.

== Etymology ==
The specific epithet is a tribute to Kálmán Lambrecht (1889–1936), a Hungarian paleornithologist.
