= Saxicola parva =

Saxicola parva Temporal range: Pliocene

Scientific classification
- Kingdom: Animalia
- Phylum: Chordata
- Class: Aves
- Order: Passeriformes
- Family: Muscicapidae
- Genus: Saxicola
- Species: †S. parva

Binomial name
- †Saxicola parva Kessler, 2013

Extinct species of bird

Saxicola parva is an extinct species of Saxicola that inhabited Hungary during the Neogene period.

== Etymology ==
The specific epithet is derived from its smaller size. It is around the same size as the smaller recent species but is smaller than S. baranensis. "Parva" is one of the Latin words for "small".
