= Calandrella gali =

Calandrella gali Temporal range: Late Miocene

Scientific classification
- Kingdom: Animalia
- Phylum: Chordata
- Class: Aves
- Order: Passeriformes
- Family: Alaudidae
- Genus: Calandrella
- Species: †C. gali

Binomial name
- †Calandrella gali Kessler, 2013

Extinct species of bird

Calandrella gali is an extinct species of Calandrella that inhabited Hungary during the Neogene period.

== Etymology ==
The specific epithet "gali" is a tribute to the Hungarian paleornithologist Erika Gál.
