= Cettia kalmani =

Cettia kalmani Temporal range: Pliocene

Scientific classification
- Kingdom: Animalia
- Phylum: Chordata
- Class: Aves
- Order: Passeriformes
- Family: Cettiidae
- Genus: Cettia
- Species: †C. kalmani

Binomial name
- †Cettia kalmani Kessler, 2013

Extinct species of bird

Cettia kalmani is an extinct species of Cettia that inhabited Hungary during the Neogene period.

== Etymology ==
The specific epithet "kalmani" is a tribute to Hungarian paleornithologist Kálmán Lambrecht (1889–1936).
