= Phoenicurus erikai =

Phoenicurus erikai Temporal range: Pliocene

Scientific classification
- Kingdom: Animalia
- Phylum: Chordata
- Class: Aves
- Order: Passeriformes
- Family: Muscicapidae
- Genus: Phoenicurus
- Species: †P. erikai

Binomial name
- †Phoenicurus erikai Kessler, 2013

Extinct species of bird

Phoenicurus erikai is an extinct species of Phoenicurus that lived in Hungary during the Neogene period.

== Etymology ==
The specific epithet "erikai" is a tribute to Erika Gál, a Hungarian paleornithologist.
