= Bimbisula =

Bimbisula Temporal range: middle Pliocene 3.9–3.5 Ma

Scientific classification
- Domain: Eukaryota
- Kingdom: Animalia
- Phylum: Chordata
- Class: Aves
- Order: Suliformes
- Family: Sulidae
- Genus: †Bimbisula; Benson & Erickson, 2013

Species
- B. melanodactylos Benson & Erickson, 2013 (type)

Extinct genus of birds

Bimbisula ("dawn booby") is an extinct genus of sulid bird known from fossils discovered in Pliocene rocks of South Carolina, United States. The type and only named species is B. melanodactylos. The genus name is a combination of the Gullah name "Bimbi", meaning dawn, with "sula", an Icelandic word for "fool" that has been used to describe boobies (Sulidae, Sula) in general. The species name is Greek for "black-fingered", referring to the iron staining that darkened the bones of the type specimen. Bimbisula melanodactylos is based on Charleston Museum PV2818, a partial skeleton including fragments of the skull, shoulder girdle, left upper arm, right hand, and fused hip vertebrae, and much of the right leg. It was collected in 1980 by James Malcolm from a locality along the Seaboard Coast Line Railroad in Charleston County in the vicinity of the Dorchester Road overpass. A second specimen assigned to the species, Science Museum of Minnesota P90.38.8, consists of a cranium discovered in October 1990 by Bruce Erickson near the Wando Terminal. Both specimens were found in the Goose Creek Limestone, of middle Pliocene age. The type specimen comes from the upper part of the formation, which is approximately 3.6 to 3.5 million years old. The exact stratigraphy of the second specimen is uncertain, and it may be anywhere from 3.9 to 3.5 million years old. Bimbisula was a large sulid, comparable in size to smaller species of gannets, and its skeleton shows a combination of booby-like and gannet-like characteristics.
