= Acrocephalus kretzoii =

Acrocephalus kretzoii Temporal range: Pliocene

Scientific classification
- Kingdom: Animalia
- Phylum: Chordata
- Class: Aves
- Order: Passeriformes
- Family: Acrocephalidae
- Genus: Acrocephalus
- Species: †A. kretzoii

Binomial name
- †Acrocephalus kretzoii Kessler, 2013

Extinct genus of bird

Acrocephalus kretzoii is an extinct species of Acrocephalus that inhabited Hungary during the Pliocene epoch.

== Etymology ==
The specific epithet "kretzoii" is a tribute to Hungarian paleornithologist Miklós Kretzoi.
