= Muscicapa miklosi =

Muscicapa miklosi Temporal range: Late Miocene

Scientific classification
- Kingdom: Animalia
- Phylum: Chordata
- Class: Aves
- Order: Passeriformes
- Family: Muscicapidae
- Genus: Muscicapa
- Species: †M. miklosi

Binomial name
- †Muscicapa miklosi Kessler, 2013

Extinct species of bird

Muscicapa miklosi is an extinct species of Old World flycatcher: a passerine bird in the genus Muscicapa that inhabited Hungary during the Neogene period.

== Description ==
This species is similar in size and characteristics to recent species and is distinguished from M. leganyii by being younger. M. miklosi was from the late Miocene and M. leganyii was from the middle Miocene.

== Etymology ==
The specific epithet "miklosi" is a tribute to Miklós Kretzoi, a Hungarian paleornithologist.
