= Lullula minuscula =

Lullula minuscula Temporal range: Pliocene

Scientific classification
- Kingdom: Animalia
- Phylum: Chordata
- Class: Aves
- Order: Passeriformes
- Family: Alaudidae
- Genus: Lullula
- Species: †L. minuscula

Binomial name
- †Lullula minuscula Kessler, 2013

Extinct species of bird

Lullula minuscula is an extinct species of lark in the genus Lullula that inhabited Hungary during the Neogene period.

== Etymology ==
The specific epithet "minuscula" is derived from its very small-sized dimensions. It is the same size as Lullula minor.
