= Troglodytes robustus =

Troglodytes robustus Temporal range: Late Miocene

Scientific classification
- Kingdom: Animalia
- Phylum: Chordata
- Class: Aves
- Order: Passeriformes
- Family: Troglodytidae
- Genus: Troglodytes
- Species: †T. robustus

Binomial name
- †Troglodytes robustus Kessler, 2013

Extinct genus of bird

Troglodytes robustus is an extinct species of Troglodytes that inhabited Hungary during the Neogene period.
