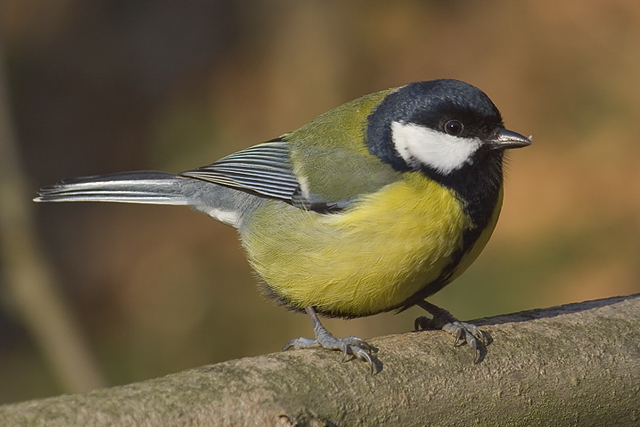
- Great tit Parus major

Scientific classification
- Kingdom: Animalia
- Phylum: Chordata
- Class: Aves
- Order: Passeriformes
- Family: Paridae
- Genus: Parus; Linnaeus, 1758

Type species
- Parus major (great tit) Linnaeus, 1758

Species
- See text
- Distribution of the species in the genus Parus. Parus bokharensis is now treated as a subspecies of P. major

= Parus =

Genus of birds

Parus is a genus of Old World birds in the tit family Paridae. It was formerly a large genus containing most of the 50 odd species in the family Paridae. The genus was split into several resurrected genera following the publication of a detailed molecular phylogenetic analysis in 2013. The genus name, Parus, is the Latin word for "tit".

== Taxonomy ==
The genus Parus was introduced in 1758 by the Swedish naturalist Carl Linnaeus in the tenth edition of his Systema Naturae. The genus name is Latin for "tit". Of the 12 species included in the genus by Linnaeus, the type species was designated as the great tit (Parus major) by George Robert Gray in 1840.

=== Species ===
The genus now contains the following three species:

Genus Parus – Linnaeus, 1758 – three species
Common name	Scientific name and subspecies	Range	Size and ecology	IUCN status and estimated population
Great tit	Parus major Linnaeus, 1758 Fifteen subspecies: P. m. newtoni Pražák 1894.; P. m. major Linnaeus 1758.; P. m. excelsus Buvry 1857.; P. m. corsus Kleinschmidt 1903.; P. m. mallorcae von Jordans 1913.; P. m. niethammeri von Jordans 1970.; P. m. aphrodite Madarász 1901.; P. m. terrasanctae Hartert 1910.; P. m. karelini Zarudny 1910; P. m. blandfordi Pražák 1894; P. m. bokharensis Lichtenstein 1823; P. m. turkestanicus Zarudny & Loudon 1905; P. m. ferghanensis Buturlin 1912; P. m. kapustini Portenko 1954	Europe	Size: Habitat: Diet:	LC
Cinereous tit	Parus cinereus (, ) Nineteen subspecies: P. c. decolorans Koelz, 1939; P. c. ziaratensis Whistler, 1929; P. c. caschmirensisHartert, EJO, 1905; P. c. planorum Hartert, EJO, 1905; P. c. vauriei Ripley, 1950; P. c. stupae Koelz, 1939; P. c. mahrattarum Hartert, EJO, 1905; P. c. templorum Meyer de Schauensee, 1946; P. c. hainanus Hartert, EJO, 1905; P. c. ambiguus (Raffles, 1822); P. c. sarawacensis Slater, HH, 1885; P. c. cinereus Vieillot, 1818; P. c. minor Temminck & Schlegel, 1848; P. c. dageletensis Kuroda & Nm & Mori, 1920 ); P. c. amamiensis Kleinschmidt, 1922; P. c. nigriloris Hellmayr, 1900; P. c. tibetanus Hartert, EJO, 1905; P. c. commixtus Swinhoe, 1868; P. c. nubicolus Meyer de Schauensee, 1946	West Asia across South Asia and into Southeast Asia.	Size: Habitat: Diet:	LC
Green-backed tit	Parus monticolus Vigors, 1831	Bangladesh, Bhutan, China, India, Laos, Burma, Nepal, Pakistan, Taiwan and Vietnam.	Size: Habitat: Diet:	LC

== Fossil record ==
- Parus robustus (Pliocene of Csarnota, Hungary)
- Parus parvulus (Pliocene of Csarnota, Hungary)
- Parus medius (Pliocene of Beremend, Hungary)
