= Pinicola kubinyii =

Pinicola kubinyii Temporal range: Pliocene

Scientific classification
- Kingdom: Animalia
- Phylum: Chordata
- Class: Aves
- Order: Passeriformes
- Family: Fringillidae
- Subfamily: Carduelinae
- Genus: Pinicola
- Species: †P. kubinyii

Binomial name
- †Pinicola kubinyii Kessler, 2013

Extinct species of bird

Pinicola kubinyii is an extinct species of grosbeak: a passerine bird in the genus Pinicola that inhabited Hungary during the Neogene period.
