= Turdus medius =

Turdus medius Temporal range: Pliocene

Scientific classification
- Kingdom: Animalia
- Phylum: Chordata
- Class: Aves
- Order: Passeriformes
- Family: Turdidae
- Genus: Turdus
- Species: †T. medius

Binomial name
- †Turdus medius Kessler, 2013

Extinct species of bird

Turdus medius is an extinct species of Turdus that inhabited Hungary during the Neogene period.

== Etymology ==
The specific epithet "medius" is derived from its medium-sized dimensions, which correspond to Turdus merula.
