= Lullula slivnicensis =

Lullula slivnicensis Temporal range: Late Pliocene

Scientific classification
- Kingdom: Animalia
- Phylum: Chordata
- Class: Aves
- Order: Passeriformes
- Family: Alaudidae
- Genus: Lullula
- Species: †L. slivnicensis

Binomial name
- †Lullula slivnicensis Boev, 2012

Extinct species of bird

Lullula slivnicensis is an extinct species of lark in the genus Lullula that lived in Bulgaria during the Neogene period.
