= Locustella magna =

Locustella magna Temporal range: Pliocene

Scientific classification
- Kingdom: Animalia
- Phylum: Chordata
- Class: Aves
- Order: Passeriformes
- Family: Locustellidae
- Genus: Locustella
- Species: †L. magna

Binomial name
- †Locustella magna Kessler, 2013

Extinct species of bird

Locustella magna is an extinct species of Locustella that inhabited Hungary during the Neogene period.

== Etymology ==
The specific epithet "magna" is the Latin word for "big", after the relatively large size of the species.
