= Galerida pannonica =

Galerida pannonica Temporal range: Pliocene

Scientific classification
- Kingdom: Animalia
- Phylum: Chordata
- Class: Aves
- Order: Passeriformes
- Family: Alaudidae
- Genus: Galerida
- Species: †G. pannonica

Binomial name
- †Galerida pannonica Kessler, 2013

Extinct species of bird

Galerida pannonica is an extinct species of Galerida that inhabited Hungary during the Neogene period.

== Etymology ==
The specific epithet "pannonica" is derived from the Pannonia region.
