= Certhia immensa =

Certhia immensa Temporal range: Pliocene

Scientific classification
- Kingdom: Animalia
- Phylum: Chordata
- Class: Aves
- Order: Passeriformes
- Family: Certhiidae
- Genus: Certhia
- Species: †C. immensa

Binomial name
- †Certhia immensa Kessler, 2013

Extinct species of bird

Certhia immensa is an extinct species of Certhia that inhabited Hungary during the Neogene period.

== Etymology ==
The specific epithet "immensa" is derived from its large-sized dimensions.
