= Acrocephalus major =

Acrocephalus major Temporal range: Late Miocene

Scientific classification
- Kingdom: Animalia
- Phylum: Chordata
- Class: Aves
- Order: Passeriformes
- Family: Acrocephalidae
- Genus: Acrocephalus
- Species: †A. major

Binomial name
- †Acrocephalus major Kessler, 2013

Extinct species of bird

Acrocephalus major is an extinct species of Acrocephalus that inhabited Hungary during the Neogene period.

== Etymology ==
The specific epithet "major" is derived from its larger-sized dimensions.
