= Sturnus baranensis =

Sturnus baranensis Temporal range: Pliocene

Scientific classification
- Kingdom: Animalia
- Phylum: Chordata
- Class: Aves
- Order: Passeriformes
- Family: Sturnidae
- Genus: Sturnus
- Species: †S. baranensis

Binomial name
- †Sturnus baranensis Kessler, 2013

Extinct species of bird

Sturnus baranensis is an extinct species of Sturnus that inhabited Hungary during the Neogene period.
