= Sylvia pussila =

Sylvia pussila Temporal range: Pliocene

Scientific classification
- Kingdom: Animalia
- Phylum: Chordata
- Class: Aves
- Order: Passeriformes
- Family: Sylviidae
- Genus: Sylvia
- Species: †S. pussila

Binomial name
- †Sylvia pussila Kessler, 2013

Extinct species of bird

Sylvia pussila is an extinct species of Sylvia that inhabited Hungary during the Neogene period.

== Etymology ==
The specific epithet "pussila" is derived from the Latin word for "small" (pusilla), which means that this is likely a case of lapsus calami. The describing author, Kessler, made the same mistake where he wrote "Sitta pusilla" most of the time, but also once as "Sitta pussila" while listing species.
