= Hippolais veterior =

Hippolais veterior Temporal range: Late Miocene

Scientific classification
- Kingdom: Animalia
- Phylum: Chordata
- Class: Aves
- Order: Passeriformes
- Family: Acrocephalidae
- Genus: Hippolais
- Species: †H. veterior

Binomial name
- †Hippolais veterior Kessler, 2013

Extinct species of bird

Hippolais veterior is an extinct species of Hippolais that inhabited Hungary during the Neogene period.

== Etymology ==
The specific epithet "veterior" is derived from the Latin word for "old".
