= Turdicus =

Turdicus Temporal range: Middle Miocene – Lower Pleistocene

Scientific classification
- Domain: Eukaryota
- Kingdom: Animalia
- Phylum: Chordata
- Class: Aves
- Order: Passeriformes
- Family: Turdidae
- Genus: †Turdicus; Kretzoi, 1962

Extinct species of bird

Turdicus is an extinct genus of thrush that has been identified in Romania and Hungary.

== Species ==
The following species are included:

- †Turdicus matraensis Kessler & Hír, 2012
- †Turdicus pannonicus Kessler, 2013
- †Turdicus tenuis Kretzoi, 1962 (Nomen nudum)
