= Bombycilla kubinyii =

Bombycilla kubinyii Temporal range: Pliocene

Scientific classification
- Kingdom: Animalia
- Phylum: Chordata
- Class: Aves
- Order: Passeriformes
- Family: Bombycillidae
- Genus: Bombycilla
- Species: †B. kubinyii

Binomial name
- †Bombycilla kubinyii Kessler, 2013

Extinct species of bird

Bombycilla kubinyii is an extinct species of Bombycilla that inhabited Hungary during the Neogene period.
