= Riparia minor =

Riparia minor Temporal range: Late Miocene

Scientific classification
- Kingdom: Animalia
- Phylum: Chordata
- Class: Aves
- Order: Passeriformes
- Family: Hirundinidae
- Genus: Riparia
- Species: †R. minor

Binomial name
- †Riparia minor Kessler, 2013

Extinct species of bird

Riparia minor is an extinct species of Riparia that inhabited Hungary during the Neogene period.

== Etymology ==
The specific epithet "minor" is derived from its smaller dimensions.
