= Loxia csarnotanus =

Loxia csarnotanus Temporal range: Pliocene

Scientific classification
- Kingdom: Animalia
- Phylum: Chordata
- Class: Aves
- Order: Passeriformes
- Family: Fringillidae
- Subfamily: Carduelinae
- Genus: Loxia
- Species: †L. csarnotanus

Binomial name
- †Loxia csarnotanus Kessler, 2013

Extinct species of bird

Loxia csarnotanus is an extinct species of Loxia that inhabited Hungary during the Neogene period.
