= Lullula parva =

Lullula parva Temporal range: Pliocene

Scientific classification
- Kingdom: Animalia
- Phylum: Chordata
- Class: Aves
- Order: Passeriformes
- Family: Alaudidae
- Genus: Lullula
- Species: †L. parva

Binomial name
- †Lullula parva Kessler, 2013

Extinct species of bird

Lullula parva is an extinct species of lark in the genus Lullula that inhabited Hungary during the Neogene period.

== Etymology ==
The specific epithet "parva" refers to the small-sized dimensions of the species. It is one of the Latin words for "little".
