= Hirundo gracilis =

Hirundo gracilis Temporal range: Late Miocene

Scientific classification
- Kingdom: Animalia
- Phylum: Chordata
- Class: Aves
- Order: Passeriformes
- Family: Hirundinidae
- Genus: Hirundo
- Species: †H. gracilis

Binomial name
- †Hirundo gracilis Kessler, 2013

Extinct species of bird

Hirundo gracilis is an extinct species of Hirundo that inhabited Hungary during the Neogene period.

== Etymology ==
The specific epithet "gracilis" is derived from the slenderness of its bones. "Gracilis" means "slender" in Latin. The bird itself was also more slender than more recent species.
