= Turdus miocaenicus =

Turdus miocaenicus Temporal range: Late Miocene

Scientific classification
- Kingdom: Animalia
- Phylum: Chordata
- Class: Aves
- Order: Passeriformes
- Family: Turdidae
- Genus: Turdus
- Species: †T. miocaenicus

Binomial name
- †Turdus miocaenicus Kessler, 2013

Extinct species of bird

Turdus miocaenicus is an extinct species of Turdus known to have lived in Hungary during the Late Miocene.

== Etymology ==
The specific epithet "miocaenicus" is derived from its type strata, the Late Miocene.
