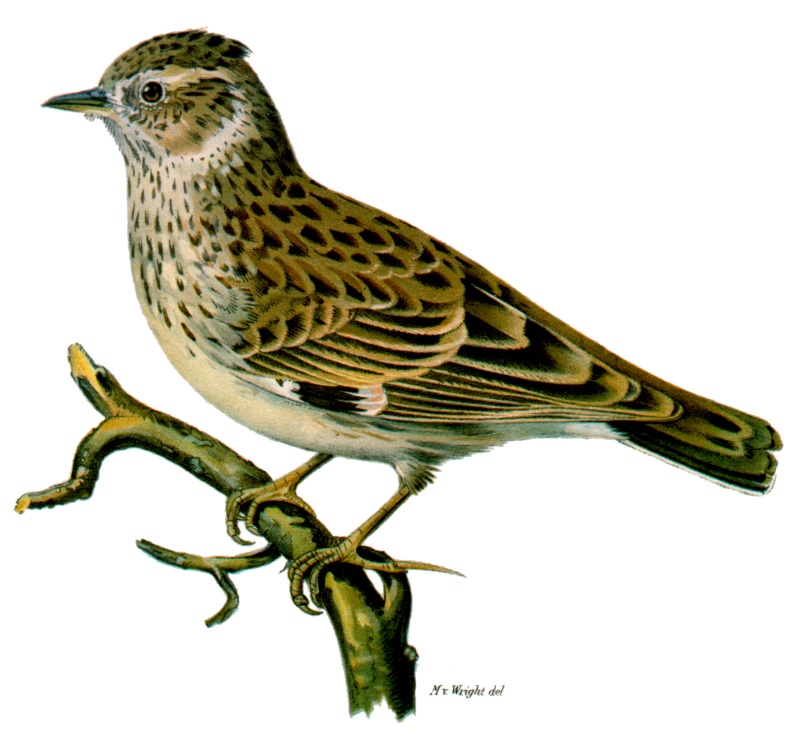

Scientific classification
- Kingdom: Animalia
- Phylum: Chordata
- Class: Aves
- Order: Passeriformes
- Family: Alaudidae
- Genus: Lullula; Kaup, 1829

Species
- See text

= Lullula =

Genus of birds

Lullula is the genus of woodlarks, songbirds in the family Alaudidae. There is only one remaining extant species, the woodlark which is found in Europe, the mountains of northern Africa, the Middle East and western Asia. The remainder are known only from the fossil record.

== Taxonomy and systematics ==
The genus Lullula was introduced by the German naturalist Johann Jakob Kaup in 1829. The genus Lullula is onomatopoeic from the French Lulu, the name given by de Buffon. Both the French name, Alouette lulu and the genus name are derived from the sound of its song.

The genus contain a single extant species, the woodlark (Lullula arborea).

=== Extinct species ===
- †Lullula balcanica - late Pliocene of Varshets, Bulgaria
- †Lullula slivnicensis - late Pliocene of Slivnitsa, Bulgaria
- †Lullula minor - late Miocene of Polgardi, Hungary
- †Lullula parva - Pliocene of Csarnota, Hungary
- †Lullula minuscula - Pliocene of Beremend, Hungary
- †Lullula neogradensis - Miocene of Mátraszőlős, Hungary
