= Turdus polgardiensis =

Turdus polgardiensis Temporal range: Late Miocene

Scientific classification
- Kingdom: Animalia
- Phylum: Chordata
- Class: Aves
- Order: Passeriformes
- Family: Turdidae
- Genus: Turdus
- Species: †T. polgardiensis

Binomial name
- †Turdus polgardiensis Kessler, 2013

Extinct species of bird

Turdus polgardiensis is an extinct species of Turdus that lived in Hungary during the Late Miocene.

== Etymology ==
The specific epithet "polgardiensis" is derived from the type locality, Polgárdi, Hungary.
