= Acrocephalus minor =

Acrocephalus minor Temporal range: Late Miocene

Scientific classification
- Kingdom: Animalia
- Phylum: Chordata
- Class: Aves
- Order: Passeriformes
- Family: Acrocephalidae
- Genus: Acrocephalus
- Species: †A. minor

Binomial name
- †Acrocephalus minor Kessler, 2013

Extinct species of bird

Acrocephalus minor is an extinct species of Acrocephalus that inhabited Hungary during the Neogene period.

== Etymology ==
The specific epithet "minor" is derived from its smaller-sized dimensions.
