= Fringilla kormosi =

Fringilla kormosi Temporal range: Late Miocene

Scientific classification
- Kingdom: Animalia
- Phylum: Chordata
- Class: Aves
- Order: Passeriformes
- Family: Fringillidae
- Genus: Fringilla
- Species: †F. kormosi

Binomial name
- †Fringilla kormosi Kessler, 2013

Extinct species of bird

Fringilla kormosi is an extinct species of Fringilla that inhabited Hungary during the Neogene period.
