= Anthus baranensis =

Anthus baranensis Temporal range: Pliocene

Scientific classification
- Kingdom: Animalia
- Phylum: Chordata
- Class: Aves
- Order: Passeriformes
- Family: Motacillidae
- Genus: Anthus
- Species: †A. baranensis

Binomial name
- †Anthus baranensis Kessler, 2013

Extinct species of bird

Anthus baranensis is an extinct species of Anthus that inhabited Hungary during the Neogene period.
