= Acrocephalus kordosi =

Acrocephalus kordosi Temporal range: Pliocene

Scientific classification
- Kingdom: Animalia
- Phylum: Chordata
- Class: Aves
- Order: Passeriformes
- Family: Acrocephalidae
- Genus: Acrocephalus
- Species: †A. kordosi

Binomial name
- †Acrocephalus kordosi Kessler, 2013

Extinct genus of bird

Acrocephalus kordosi is an extinct species of Acrocephalus that inhabited Hungary during the Neogene period.

== Etymology ==
The specific epithet "kordosi" is a tribute to Hungarian geologist and paleontologist László Kordos.
