= Regulus pliocaenicus =

Regulus pliocaenicus Temporal range: Pliocene

Scientific classification
- Kingdom: Animalia
- Phylum: Chordata
- Class: Aves
- Order: Passeriformes
- Family: Regulidae
- Genus: Regulus
- Species: †R. pliocaenicus

Binomial name
- †Regulus pliocaenicus Kessler, 2013

Extinct species of bird

Regulus pliocaenicus is an extinct species of Regulus that inhabited Hungary during the Neogene period.
