= Fringilla petenyii =

Fringilla petenyii Temporal range: Pliocene

Scientific classification
- Kingdom: Animalia
- Phylum: Chordata
- Class: Aves
- Order: Passeriformes
- Family: Fringillidae
- Genus: Fringilla
- Species: †F. petenyii

Binomial name
- †Fringilla petenyii Kessler, 2013

Extinct species of bird

Fringilla petenyii is an extinct species of Fringilla that inhabited Hungary during the Neogene period.
