= Delichon major =

Delichon major Temporal range: Pliocene

Scientific classification
- Kingdom: Animalia
- Phylum: Chordata
- Class: Aves
- Order: Passeriformes
- Family: Hirundinidae
- Genus: Delichon
- Species: †D. major

Binomial name
- †Delichon major Kessler, 2013

Extinct species of bird

Delichon major is an extinct species of Delichon that inhabited Hungary during the Neogene period.

== Etymology ==
The specific epithet "major" is derived from its larger dimensions. It is separated from other species only by this fact.
