= Locustella janossyi =

Locustella janossyi Temporal range: Pliocene

Scientific classification
- Kingdom: Animalia
- Phylum: Chordata
- Class: Aves
- Order: Passeriformes
- Family: Locustellidae
- Genus: Locustella
- Species: †L. janossyi

Binomial name
- †Locustella janossyi Kessler, 2013

Extinct species of bird

Locustella janossyi is an extinct species of Locustella that inhabited Hungary during the Neogene period.

== Etymology ==
The specific epithet "janossyi" is a tribute to Hungarian ornithologist, conservationist, and paleontologist Dénes Jánossy (1926−2005).
