= Delichon pusillus =

Delichon pusillus Temporal range: Pliocene

Scientific classification
- Kingdom: Animalia
- Phylum: Chordata
- Class: Aves
- Order: Passeriformes
- Family: Hirundinidae
- Genus: Delichon
- Species: †D. pusillus

Binomial name
- †Delichon pusillus Kessler, 2013

Extinct species of bird

Delichon pusillus is an extinct species of Delichon that inhabited Hungary during the Neogene period.

== Etymology ==
The specific epithet "pusillus" is derived from its small size. "Pusillus" means "tiny" or "very small" in Latin.
