= Parus robustus =

Parus robustus Temporal range: Pliocene

Scientific classification
- Kingdom: Animalia
- Phylum: Chordata
- Class: Aves
- Order: Passeriformes
- Family: Paridae
- Genus: Parus
- Species: †P. robustus

Binomial name
- †Parus robustus Kessler, 2013

Extinct species of bird

Parus robustus is an extinct species of Parus that inhabited Hungary during the Neogene period.

== Etymology ==
The specific epithet is derived from its larger size. It was larger than the extant great tit (Parus major).
