= Alauda tivadari =

Alauda tivadari Temporal range: Late Miocene

Scientific classification
- Kingdom: Animalia
- Phylum: Chordata
- Class: Aves
- Order: Passeriformes
- Family: Alaudidae
- Genus: Alauda
- Species: †A. tivadari

Binomial name
- †Alauda tivadari Kessler, 2013

Extinct species of bird

Alauda tivadari is an extinct species of Alauda that inhabited Hungary during the Neogene period.

== Etymology ==
The specific epithet is a tribute to Hungarian geologist, paleontologist and archaeologist Tivadar Kormos (1881–1946).
