= Bombycilla brevia =

Bombycilla brevia Temporal range: Late Miocene

Scientific classification
- Kingdom: Animalia
- Phylum: Chordata
- Class: Aves
- Order: Passeriformes
- Family: Bombycillidae
- Genus: Bombycilla
- Species: †B. brevia

Binomial name
- †Bombycilla brevia Kessler, 2013

Extinct species of bird

Bombycilla brevia is an extinct species of Bombycilla that inhabited Hungary during the Neogene period.
