= Albrecht Manegold =

German ornithologist and paleontologist

Albrecht Manegold (born 1973 in Mannheim) is a German ornithologist and paleontologist. He is the curator of the vertebrate collection at the State Museum of Natural History Karlsruhe. He is known for contributions to the study of early passerine evolution. He has described extinct passerines and piciformes including the fossil treecreeper Certhia rummeli and the fossil woodpecker Australopicus nelsonmandelai.

== Education and career ==
Manegold studied biology at the Free University of Berlin. He completed his PhD thesis in 2005, on the phylogeny and evolution of the Coraciiformes (kinfishers, bee-eaters and allies), Piciformes (woodpeckers and allies), and Passeriformes (perching birds). He worked at Senckenberg Research Institute. He is presently the curator of the vertebrate collection of the State Museum of Natural History Karlsruhe, with research focus on fossil birds of the Maghreb and South Africa and paleornithological reconstruction.

Manegold described the extinct treecreeper Certhia rummeli from a fossilized right tarsometatarsus found in karstic fissure fillings in Petersbuch, Bavaria. The fossil woodpecker Australopicus nelsonmandelai, found at the Langebaanweg fossil site in South Africa, and representing the oldest known woodpecker in Africa, was described and named by Manegold for South African president Nelson Mandela's 94th birthday.

== Awards ==
- 2007: Bernhard Rensch Prize for his dissertation work on phylogeny and evolution of Coraciiformes, Piciformes, and Passeriformes.
- 2008: Maria Koepcke Prize for his work in creating a new classification system of passerine birds based on morphological characteristics in bone structure, clarifying relationships within living birds and allowing for assignment of extinct representatives of extant families.

== Selected publications ==
- Manegold A. (2020). New results on birds from the Early Pleistocene site of Untermassfeld. In: Kahlke (2020). Das Pleistozän von Untermassfeld bei Meiningen (Thüringen) (in German). Mainz: Verlag des Römisch-Germanischen Zentralmuseums. ISBN 978-3-88467-324-9. OCLC 1196895360.
- Pavia, Marco; Manegold, Albrecht; Haarhoff, Pippa (2014). "Early Pliocene owls (Strigiformes, Aves) from Langebaanweg, South Africa, with first evidence of the genus Athene in Africa South of the Sahara and the description of a new species of Tyto". Acta Palaeontologica Polonica. Polska Akademia Nauk Instytut Paleobiologii (Institute of Paleobiology, Polish Academy of Sciences). doi:10.4202/app.00077.2014. ISSN 0567-7920. S2CID 55448837.
- Manegold, Albrecht (6 December 2012). Rasmussen, Pamela (ed.). "Two new parrot species (Psittaciformes) from the early Pliocene of Langebaanweg, South Africa, and their palaeoecological implications". Ibis. 155 (1). Wiley: 127–139. doi:10.1111/ibi.12009. ISSN 0019-1019.
- Manegold, Albrecht; Pavia, Marco; Haarhoff, Pippa (19 September 2014). "A new species ofAegypiusvulture (Aegypiinae, Accipitridae) from the early Pliocene of South Africa". Journal of Vertebrate Paleontology. 34 (6). Informa UK Limited: 1394–1407. Bibcode:2014JVPal..34.1394M. doi:10.1080/02724634.2014.863204. ISSN 0272-4634. S2CID 85645566.
- Manegold, Albrecht; Zelenkov, Nikita (21 August 2014). "A new species of Aegypius vulture from the early Pliocene of Moldova is the earliest unequivocal evidence of Aegypiinae in Europe". Paläontologische Zeitschrift. 89 (3). Springer Science and Business Media LLC: 529–534. doi:10.1007/s12542-014-0242-4. ISSN 0031-0220. S2CID 129035036.
- Manegold A., Louchart A., Carrier J. & Elzanowski A. (2013). The Early Pliocene avifauna of Langebaanweg (South Africa): a review and update. In: Göhlich, U.B., Kroh, A. (eds.) Paleornithological Research 2013 – Proceedings of the 8th International Meeting of the Society of Avian Paleontology and Evolution: 135–152.
- Manegold A., Podsiadlowski L. (2013). Erste morphologische und molekulare Untersuchungen zur phylogenetischen Stellung des Grünköpfchens Agapornis swindernianus. Vogelwarte 51: 348.
- Manegold, Albrecht; Töpfer, Till (22 October 2012). "The systematic position of Hemicircus and the stepwise evolution of adaptations for drilling, tapping and climbing up in true woodpeckers (Picinae, Picidae)". Journal of Zoological Systematics and Evolutionary Research. 51 (1). Wiley: 72–82. doi:10.1111/jzs.12000. ISSN 0947-5745.
- Manegold, Albrecht; Louchart, Antoine (26 June 2012). "Biogeographic and paleoenvironmental implications of a new woodpecker species (Aves, Picidae) from the early Pliocene of South Africa". Journal of Vertebrate Paleontology. 32 (4). Informa UK Limited: 926–938. Bibcode:2012JVPal..32..926M. doi:10.1080/02724634.2012.664597. ISSN 0272-4634. S2CID 85421020.
- Manegold, Albrecht (2008a). "Passerine diversity in the late Oligocene of Germany: earliest evidence for the sympatric coexistence of Suboscines and Oscines". Ibis. 150 (2): 377–387. doi:10.1111/j.1474-919X.2008.00802.x. ISSN 1474-919X.
- Manegold, Albrecht (2008b). "Earliest fossil record of the Certhioidea (treecreepers and allies) from the early Miocene of Germany". Journal of Ornithology. 149 (2): 223–228. doi:10.1007/s10336-007-0263-9. ISSN 2193-7192. S2CID 11900733.
- Manegold, Albrecht (2006). "Two Additional Synapomorphies of Grebes Podicipedidae and Flamingos Phoenicopteridae". Acta Ornithologica. 41 (1): 79–82. doi:10.3161/068.041.0113. ISSN 0001-6454. S2CID 86248914.
- Mayr, Gerald; Manegold, Albrecht (1 August 2006). "A Small Suboscine-Like Passeriform Bird from the Early Oligocene of France". The Condor. 108 (3): 717–720. doi:10.1093/condor/108.3.717. ISSN 0010-5422.
