= Saxicola magna =

Saxicola magna Temporal range: Pliocene

Scientific classification
- Kingdom: Animalia
- Phylum: Chordata
- Class: Aves
- Order: Passeriformes
- Family: Muscicapidae
- Genus: Saxicola
- Species: †S. magna

Binomial name
- †Saxicola magna Kessler, 2013

Extinct species of bird

Saxicola magna is an extinct species of Saxicola that inhabited Hungary during the Neogene period.

== Etymology ==
The specific epithet is derived from the larger size of this species.
