= Oriolus beremendensis =

Oriolus beremendensis Temporal range: Pliocene

Scientific classification
- Kingdom: Animalia
- Phylum: Chordata
- Class: Aves
- Order: Passeriformes
- Family: Oriolidae
- Genus: Oriolus
- Species: †O. beremendensis

Binomial name
- †Oriolus beremendensis Kessler, 2013

Extinct species of bird

Oriolus beremendensis is an extinct species of Oriolus that inhabited Hungary during the Neogene period.

== Etymology ==
The specific epithet "beremendensis" is derived from the type locality, Beremend. The Latin suffix "-ensis" means "originating in" or "pertaining to".
