= Hirundo major =

Hirundo major Temporal range: Pliocene

Scientific classification
- Kingdom: Animalia
- Phylum: Chordata
- Class: Aves
- Order: Passeriformes
- Family: Hirundinidae
- Genus: Hirundo
- Species: †H. major

Binomial name
- †Hirundo major Kessler, 2013

Extinct species of bird

Hirundo major is an extinct species of Hirundo that inhabited Hungary during the Neogene period.

== Etymology ==
The specific epithet is derived from its large size.
