= Phoenicurus baranensis =

Phoenicurus baranensis Temporal range: Pliocene

Scientific classification
- Kingdom: Animalia
- Phylum: Chordata
- Class: Aves
- Order: Passeriformes
- Family: Muscicapidae
- Genus: Phoenicurus
- Species: †P. baranensis

Binomial name
- †Phoenicurus baranensis Kessler, 2013

Extinct species of bird

Phoenicurus baranensis is an extinct species of Phoenicurus that inhabited Hungary during the Neogene period.

== Etymology ==
The specific epithet "baranensis" is derived from the Baranya County. The type locality, Beremend, is located here.
