= Sylvia intermedia =

Sylvia intermedia Temporal range: Late Miocene

Scientific classification
- Kingdom: Animalia
- Phylum: Chordata
- Class: Aves
- Order: Passeriformes
- Family: Sylviidae
- Genus: Sylvia
- Species: †S. intermedia

Binomial name
- †Sylvia intermedia Kessler, 2013

Extinct species of bird

Sylvia intermedia is an extinct species of Sylvia that inhabited Hungary during the Neogene period.

== Etymology ==
The specific epithet "intermedia" is derived from its medium-sized dimensions.
