= Aegithalos congruis =

Aegithalos congruis Temporal range: Pliocene

Scientific classification
- Kingdom: Animalia
- Phylum: Chordata
- Class: Aves
- Order: Passeriformes
- Family: Aegithalidae
- Genus: Aegithalos
- Species: †A. congruis

Binomial name
- †Aegithalos congruis Kessler, 2013

Extinct species of bird

Aegithalos congruis is an extinct species of Aegithalos that inhabited Hungary during the Pliocene epoch.

== Etymology ==
The specific epithet "congruis" is the Latin word for "agreement" or "corresponding". This refers to the features corresponding greatly to its recent relatives in both size and characters.
