= Motacilla minor =

Motacilla minor Temporal range: Pliocene

Scientific classification
- Kingdom: Animalia
- Phylum: Chordata
- Class: Aves
- Order: Passeriformes
- Family: Motacillidae
- Genus: Motacilla
- Species: †M. minor

Binomial name
- †Motacilla minor Kessler, 2013

Extinct species of bird

Motacilla minor is an extinct species of Motacilla that inhabited Hungary during the Neogene period.
