= Parus medius =

Parus medius Temporal range: Pliocene

Scientific classification
- Kingdom: Animalia
- Phylum: Chordata
- Class: Aves
- Order: Passeriformes
- Family: Paridae
- Genus: Parus
- Species: †P. medius

Binomial name
- †Parus medius Kessler, 2013

Extinct species of bird

Parus medius is an extinct species of Parus that inhabited Hungary during the Neogene period.

== Etymology ==
The specific epithet "medius" is derived from its medium-sized dimensions.
