= Sitta villanyensis =

Sitta villanyensis Temporal range: Pliocene

Scientific classification
- Kingdom: Animalia
- Phylum: Chordata
- Class: Aves
- Order: Passeriformes
- Family: Sittidae
- Genus: Sitta
- Species: †S. villanyensis

Binomial name
- †Sitta villanyensis Kessler, 2013

Extinct species of bird

Sitta villanyensis is an extinct species of nuthatch: a passerine bird in the genus Sitta that inhabited Hungary during the Neogene period.

== Etymology ==
The specific epithet "villanyensis" is derived from the Villány Hill in Hungary.
