= Cettia janossyi =

Cettia janossyi Temporal range: Late Miocene

Scientific classification
- Kingdom: Animalia
- Phylum: Chordata
- Class: Aves
- Order: Passeriformes
- Family: Cettiidae
- Genus: Cettia
- Species: †C. janossyi

Binomial name
- †Cettia janossyi Kessler, 2013

Extinct species of bird

Cettia janossyi is an extinct species of Cettia that inhabited Hungary during the Neogene period.

== Etymology ==
The specific epithet "janossyi" is a tribute to Hungarian ornithologist, conservationist, and paleontologist Dénes Jánossy (1926−2005).
