= Lullula balcanica =

Lullula balcanica Temporal range: Piacenzian

Scientific classification
- Kingdom: Animalia
- Phylum: Chordata
- Class: Aves
- Order: Passeriformes
- Family: Alaudidae
- Genus: Lullula
- Species: †L. balcanica

Binomial name
- †Lullula balcanica Boev, 2012

Extinct species of bird

Lullula balcanica is an extinct species of lark in the genus Lullula that lived in Bulgaria during the Neogene period.
