= Motacilla robusta =

Motacilla robusta Temporal range: Pliocene

Scientific classification
- Kingdom: Animalia
- Phylum: Chordata
- Class: Aves
- Order: Passeriformes
- Family: Motacillidae
- Genus: Motacilla
- Species: †M. robusta

Binomial name
- †Motacilla robusta Kessler, 2013

Extinct species of bird

Motacilla robusta is an extinct species of Motacilla that inhabited Hungary during the Neogene period.
