= Motacilla intermedia =

Motacilla intermedia Temporal range: Late Miocene

Scientific classification
- Kingdom: Animalia
- Phylum: Chordata
- Class: Aves
- Order: Passeriformes
- Family: Motacillidae
- Genus: Motacilla
- Species: †M. intermedia

Binomial name
- †Motacilla intermedia Kessler, 2013

Extinct species of bird

Motacilla intermedia is an extinct species of Motacilla that inhabited Hungary during the Neogene period.
