= Picus pliocaenicus =

Picus pliocaenicus Temporal range: Pliocene

Scientific classification
- Kingdom: Animalia
- Phylum: Chordata
- Class: Aves
- Order: Piciformes
- Family: Picidae
- Genus: Picus
- Species: †P. pliocaenicus

Binomial name
- †Picus pliocaenicus Kessler, 2013

Extinct species of bird

Picus pliocaenicus is an extinct species of Picus that inhabited Hungary during the Neogene period.
