= Aegithalos gaspariki =

Aegithalos gaspariki Temporal range: Late Miocene

Scientific classification
- Kingdom: Animalia
- Phylum: Chordata
- Class: Aves
- Order: Passeriformes
- Family: Aegithalidae
- Genus: Aegithalos
- Species: †A. gaspariki

Binomial name
- †Aegithalos gaspariki Kessler, 2013

Extinct species of bird

Aegithalos gaspariki is an extinct species of Aegithalos that inhabited Hungary during the Late Miocene.

== Etymology ==
The specific epithet "gaspariki" is a tribute to the Hungarian paleontologist Mihály Gasparik.
