= Turdus minor =

Turdus minor Temporal range: Pliocene

Scientific classification
- Kingdom: Animalia
- Phylum: Chordata
- Class: Aves
- Order: Passeriformes
- Family: Turdidae
- Genus: Turdus
- Species: †T. minor

Binomial name
- †Turdus minor Kessler, 2013

Extinct species of bird

Turdus minor is an extinct species of Turdus that inhabited Hungary during the Neogene period.

== Etymology ==
The specific epithet "minor" is derived from the smaller sizes of this species. It is similar in dimensions to Turdus philomelos. However, Turdus minor is still smaller.
