= Carduelis kretzoii =

Carduelis kretzoii Temporal range: Late Miocene

Scientific classification
- Kingdom: Animalia
- Phylum: Chordata
- Class: Aves
- Order: Passeriformes
- Family: Fringillidae
- Subfamily: Carduelinae
- Genus: Carduelis
- Species: †C. kretzoii

Binomial name
- †Carduelis kretzoii Kessler, 2013

Extinct species of bird

Carduelis kretzoii is an extinct species of Carduelis that inhabited Hungary during the Neogene period.
