= Sturnus brevis =

Sturnus brevis Temporal range: Late Miocene

Scientific classification
- Kingdom: Animalia
- Phylum: Chordata
- Class: Aves
- Order: Passeriformes
- Family: Sturnidae
- Genus: Sturnus
- Species: †S. brevis

Binomial name
- †Sturnus brevis Kessler, 2013

Extinct species of bird

Sturnus brevis is an extinct species of Sturnus that inhabited Hungary during the Neogene period.
