= Sitta gracilis =

Sitta gracilis Temporal range: Late Miocene

Scientific classification
- Kingdom: Animalia
- Phylum: Chordata
- Class: Aves
- Order: Passeriformes
- Family: Sittidae
- Genus: Sitta
- Species: †S. gracilis

Binomial name
- †Sitta gracilis Kessler, 2013

Extinct species of bird

Sitta gracilis is an extinct species of Sitta that inhabited Hungary during the Neogene period. It is smaller than recent species.

== Etymology ==
The specific epithet "gracilis" is derived from its slenderness. "Gracilis" means "slender" in Latin.
