= Plectrophenax veterior =

Plectrophenax veterior Temporal range: Late Miocene

Scientific classification
- Kingdom: Animalia
- Phylum: Chordata
- Class: Aves
- Order: Passeriformes
- Family: Calcariidae
- Genus: Plectrophenax
- Species: †P. veterior

Binomial name
- †Plectrophenax veterior Kessler, 2013

Extinct species of bird

Plectrophenax veterior is an extinct species of bunting: a passerine bird in the genus Plectrophenax that inhabited Hungary during the Neogene period.
