= Lanius hungaricus =

Lanius hungaricus Temporal range: Pliocene

Scientific classification
- Kingdom: Animalia
- Phylum: Chordata
- Class: Aves
- Order: Passeriformes
- Family: Laniidae
- Genus: Lanius
- Species: †L. hungaricus

Binomial name
- †Lanius hungaricus Kessler, 2013

Extinct species of bird

Lanius hungaricus is an extinct species of Lanius that inhabited Hungary during the Neogene period.
