= Locustella kordosi =

Locustella kordosi Temporal range: Late Miocene

Scientific classification
- Kingdom: Animalia
- Phylum: Chordata
- Class: Aves
- Order: Passeriformes
- Family: Locustellidae
- Genus: Locustella
- Species: †L. kordosi

Binomial name
- †Locustella kordosi Kessler, 2013

Extinct species of bird

Locustella kordosi is an extinct species of Locustella that inhabited Hungary during the Neogene period.

== Etymology ==
The specific epithet "kordosi" is a tribute to Hungarian geologist and paleontologist László Kordos.
