= Carduelis parvulus =

Carduelis parvulus Temporal range: Pliocene

Scientific classification
- Kingdom: Animalia
- Phylum: Chordata
- Class: Aves
- Order: Passeriformes
- Family: Fringillidae
- Subfamily: Carduelinae
- Genus: Carduelis
- Species: †C. parvulus

Binomial name
- †Carduelis parvulus Kessler, 2013

Extinct species of bird

Carduelis parvulus is an extinct species of Carduelis that inhabited Hungary during the Neogene period.
