= Phylloscopus pliocaenicus =

Phylloscopus pliocaenicus Temporal range: Pliocene

Scientific classification
- Kingdom: Animalia
- Phylum: Chordata
- Class: Aves
- Order: Passeriformes
- Family: Phylloscopidae
- Genus: Phylloscopus
- Species: †P. pliocaenicus

Binomial name
- †Phylloscopus pliocaenicus Kessler, 2013

Extinct species of bird

Phylloscopus pliocaenicus is an extinct species of Phylloscopus that inhabited Hungary during the Neogene period.
