= Delichon polgardiensis =

Delichon polgardiensis Temporal range: Late Miocene

Scientific classification
- Kingdom: Animalia
- Phylum: Chordata
- Class: Aves
- Order: Passeriformes
- Family: Hirundinidae
- Genus: Delichon
- Species: †D. polgardiensis

Binomial name
- †Delichon polgardiensis Kessler, 2013

Extinct species of bird

Delichon polgardiensis is an extinct species of Delichon that inhabited Hungary during the Neogene period.
