= Phylloscopus venczeli =

Phylloscopus venczeli Temporal range: Late Miocene

Scientific classification
- Kingdom: Animalia
- Phylum: Chordata
- Class: Aves
- Order: Passeriformes
- Family: Phylloscopidae
- Genus: Phylloscopus
- Species: †P. venczeli

Binomial name
- †Phylloscopus venczeli Kessler, 2013

Extinct species of bird

Phylloscopus venczeli is an extinct species of Phylloscopus that inhabited Hungary during the Neogene period.
