= Rodolphe Tabuce =

French palaeontologist

- Years active: 2006-present
- Known for: Afrotherian palaeobiology

Rodolphe Tabuce is a French palaeontologist. His research primarily focuses on the biology of Cenozoic mammals, particularly afrotherians.

== Career ==
Tabuce is a member of the Regional Geological Heritage Commission and of the Regional Scientific Council for Natural Heritage for the Occitanie region.

Tabuce is known for his studies of the dental anatomy and enamel microstructure of various mammal clades, including anthracotheriids, proboscideans, and hyracoids.

Below is a list of taxa that Tabuce has contributed to naming:

Year	Taxon	Authors
2025	Lazibadapis anchomomyinopsis gen. et sp. nov.	Marivaux, Charruault, Adaci, Bensalah, Mahboubi, Mebrouk, Ammar, Essid, Marzougui, Temani, & Tabuce
2025	Algeripithecus minimissimus sp. nov.	Marivaux, Charruault, Adaci, Bensalah, Mahboubi, Mebrouk, Ammar, Essid, Marzougui, Temani, & Tabuce
2025	Azibius magnus sp. nov.	Marivaux, Charruault, Adaci, Bensalah, Mahboubi, Mebrouk, Ammar, Essid, Marzougui, Temani, & Tabuce
2024	Thyreosaurus atlasicus gen. et sp. nov.	Zafaty, Oukassou, Riguetti, Company, Bendrioua, Tabuce, Charrière, & Pereda-Superbiola
2024	Peradectes crocheti sp. nov.	Gernelle, Billet, Gheerbrant, Godinot, Marandat, Ladevèze, & Tabuce
2020	Saloumia gorodiskii gen. et sp. nov.	Tabuce, Sarr, Adnet, Lebrun, Lihoreau, Martin, Sambou, Thiam, & Hautier
2017	Phenacophiomys occidentalis gen. et sp. nov.	Marivaux, Adnet, Benammi, Tabuce, Yans, & Benammi
2017	Neophiomys minutus sp. nov.	Marivaux, Adnet, Benammi, Tabuce, Yans, & Benammi
2017	Mubhammys atlanticus sp. nov.	Marivaux, Adnet, Benammi, Tabuce, Yans, & Benammi
2014	Furodon crocheti gen. et sp. nov.	Solé, Lhuillier, Adaci, Bensalah, Mahboubi, & Tabuce
2014	Parvavorodon gheerbranti gen. et sp. nov.	Solé, Lhuillier, Adaci, Bensalah, Mahboubi, & Tabuce
2013	Mistralestes arcensis gen. et sp. nov.	Tabuce, Tortosa, Vianey-Liaud, Garcia, Lebrun, Godefroit, Dutour, Berton, Valentin, & Cheylan
2012	Witwatia sigei sp. nov.	Ravel, Marivaux, Tabuce, Ben Haj Ali, Essid, & Vianey-Liaud
2011	Mondegodon eutrigonus gen. et sp. nov.	Tabuce, Clavel, & Antunes
2011	Lazibemys zegdouensis gen. et sp. nov.	Marivaux, Adaci, Bensalah, Rodrigues, Hautier, Mahboubi, Mebrouk, Tabuce, & Vianey-Liaud
2011	Lavocatavis africana gen. et sp. nov.	Mourer-Chauviré, Tabuce, Mahboubi, Adaci, & Bensalah
2006	Moeritherium chehbeurameuri sp. nov.	Delmer, Mahmoubi, Tabuce, & Tassy
