= Cinclus minor =

Cinclus minor Temporal range: Pliocene

Scientific classification
- Kingdom: Animalia
- Phylum: Chordata
- Class: Aves
- Order: Passeriformes
- Family: Cinclidae
- Genus: Cinclus
- Species: †C. minor

Binomial name
- †Cinclus minor Kessler, 2013

Extinct species of bird

Cinclus minor is an extinct species of Cinclus that inhabited Hungary during the Neogene period.
