= Turdicus pannonicus =

Turdicus pannonicus Temporal range: Late Miocene

Scientific classification
- Kingdom: Animalia
- Phylum: Chordata
- Class: Aves
- Order: Passeriformes
- Family: Turdidae
- Genus: †Turdicus
- Species: †T. pannonicus

Binomial name
- †Turdicus pannonicus Kessler, 2013

Extinct species of bird

Turdicus pannonicus is an extinct species of Turdicus that inhabited Hungary during the Neogene period. Morphological characteristics on the skeleton of this species are intermediate between the other two known members of the genus Turdicus, which helps to differentiate it from its closest relatives.

== Etymology ==
The specific epithet "pannonicus" is derived from the Pannonia region.
