= Passer minusculus =

Passer minusculus Temporal range: Pliocene

Scientific classification
- Kingdom: Animalia
- Phylum: Chordata
- Class: Aves
- Order: Passeriformes
- Family: Passeridae
- Genus: Passer
- Species: †P. minusculus

Binomial name
- †Passer minusculus Kessler, 2013

Extinct species of bird

Passer minusculus is an extinct species of Passer that inhabited Hungary during the Neogene period.
