= Lullula minor =

Lullula minor Temporal range: Late Miocene

Scientific classification
- Kingdom: Animalia
- Phylum: Chordata
- Class: Aves
- Order: Passeriformes
- Family: Alaudidae
- Genus: Lullula
- Species: †L. minor

Binomial name
- †Lullula minor Kessler, 2013

Extinct species of bird

Lullula minor is an extinct species of lark in the genus Lullula that inhabited Hungary during the Neogene period.

== Etymology ==
The specific epithet "minor" is derived from its small-sized dimensions.
