= Saxicola baranensis =

Saxicola baranensis Temporal range: Pliocene

Scientific classification
- Kingdom: Animalia
- Phylum: Chordata
- Class: Aves
- Order: Passeriformes
- Family: Muscicapidae
- Genus: Saxicola
- Species: †S. baranensis

Binomial name
- †Saxicola baranensis Kessler, 2013

Extinct species of bird

Saxicola baranensis is an extinct species of Saxicola that inhabited Hungary during the Neogene period.
