= Agapornis attenboroughi =

Agapornis attenboroughi Temporal range: Early Pliocene

Scientific classification
- Domain: Eukaryota
- Kingdom: Animalia
- Phylum: Chordata
- Class: Aves
- Order: Psittaciformes
- Family: Psittaculidae
- Genus: Agapornis
- Species: †A. attenboroughi

Binomial name
- †Agapornis attenboroughi Manegold, 2013

Extinct species of bird

Agapornis attenboroughi is an extinct species of Agapornis that inhabited South Africa during the Zanclean epoch. It is named after Sir David Attenborough.
