= Lazibadapis =

Lazibadapis Temporal range: Lutetian

Scientific classification
- Kingdom: Animalia
- Phylum: Chordata
- Class: Mammalia
- Infraclass: Placentalia
- Order: Primates
- Suborder: Strepsirrhini
- Family: †Djebelemuridae
- Genus: †Lazibadapis
- Species: †L. anchomomyinopsis

Binomial name
- †Lazibadapis anchomomyinopsis Marivaux et al., 2025

Extinct genus of djebelemurid

Lazibadapis is an extinct genus of djebelemurid primate that lived in Algeria during the Lutetian stage of the Eocene epoch.

== Description ==
The type species, Lazibadapis anchomomyinopsis, had a body mass on the order of 100 grammes.
