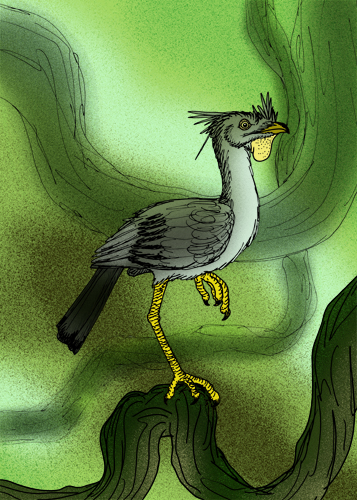
- Artist's reconstruction as a cariamiform

Scientific classification
- Kingdom: Animalia
- Phylum: Chordata
- Class: Aves
- Family: †Qianshanornithidae
- Genus: †Qianshanornis; Mayr et al. 2013

Type species
- †Qianshanornis rapax Mayr et al. 2013

= Qianshanornis =

Qianshanornis Temporal range: Middle Paleocene

Extinct genus of birds

Qianshanornis rapax is an extinct predatory bird from the Middle Paleocene of China. Q. rapax is very similar to the Eocene cariamiform Strigogyps, but it differs in being smaller, and in having a hypertrophied, hyperextensible second toe, forming a claw analogous to that of dromeosaurid dinosaurs. This toe is thought to allowed the bird to better pin down captured prey. Although very little wing-material is known, the condylar processes suggest it was capable of flight, and probably was a flier superior to either Strigogyps or modern seriemas.

Mayr and colleagues only classified Qianshanornis within its monotypic family, Qianshanornithidae, since the type specimen showed little similarity to other cariamiform birds, though they at least considered it unlikely to be a gruiform. Other researchers have also questioned its relationship with cariamiform birds and considered its systematic affinities ambiguous.
