= Bruce Erickson =

American paleontologist (1933–2022)

Bruce R. Erickson (September 29, 1933 – January 16, 2022) was an American paleontologist and the former Fitzpatrick Chair of Paleontology at the Science Museum of Minnesota. During the course of his lifetime and his 55 years as a paleontologist, he has "collected about a million specimens" and discovered fifteen new types of plants and ancient animal species. His collection includes "a triceratops skeleton" that he discovered in 1961 at the Hell Creek Formation that is considered to be "one of the rarest in the world". His research has focused almost entirely on the Paleocene era in history.

== Biography ==
According to Erickson, his interest in paleontology began when he was ten years old and he came across a geologist investigating rocks along the bank of the Mississippi River.

=== Career ===
In the 1960s, Erickson spent his time investigating "crocodile and champsosaur fossils in Alberta, Canada". It was there that he discovered "the oldest known alligator." He was also investigating crocodile fossils in South Africa during the same decade.

The main focus of his career has been on an area in western North Dakota, where he discovered that the badlands there had once been a river and swamp, "58 million to 60 million years ago". Afterward, the place became known as the Wannagan Creek site. Just from this area alone, Erickson and the rest of his team have discovered thousands of fossils since they began digging in 1970. The interest in the site began in 1970 after Erickson received a shoe box full of bone sent to him by a rancher's wife. The bones in the shoe box were found to be from six different crocodiles of Paleocene origin. It was this revelation that caused him to go and investigate the site.

Later in his career, he was involved in a "seven-year research project" at the Chandler Bridge Formation, near Charleston, SC in the late 1990s that resulted in finding the skeleton of a "28-million-year-old whale".

Erickson retired in 2017 after 58 years with the Science Museum of Minnesota. Erickson died January 16, 2022.

== Publications ==
- Erickson BR. (2005). Crocodile and arthropod tracks from the Late Paleocene Wannagan Creek Fauna of North Dakota, USA. Ichnos 12:pp303–308.
- Erickson BR. (2003). Dinosaurs of the Science Museum of Minnesota, a Curator's notebook. Research and Collections Division, Science Museum of Minnesota. pp1–86.
- Erickson BR. (1998). A Palaeophid snake from the Late Paleocene of South Carolina. Transactions of the American Philosophical Society 88:pp215–220.
- Erickson BR. (1998). Crocodilians of the Black Mingo Group (Paleocene) of the South Carolina coastal plain. Transactions of the America Philosophical Society 88:pp196–214.
- Erickson BR. & Sawyer GT. (1996). The estuarine crocodile Gavialosuchus carolinenesis n. sp. (Crocodilia: Eusuchia) from the late Oligocene of South Carolina, North America. Monographs of the Science Museum of Minnesota 3:pp1–47.
- Erickson BR. (1991). Flora and fauna of the Wannagan Creek Quarry: late Paleocene of North America. Scientific Publications, Science Museum of Minnesota 7:pp1–19.
- Erickson BR. (1987). Simoedosaurus dakotensis, n. sp., a lepidosaurian reptile (Diapsida: Choristodera) from the Paleocene of North America. Journal of Vertebrate Paleontology 7:pp237–251.
- Erickson BR. (1985). Aspects of some anatomical structures of Champsosaurus (Reptilia: Eosuchia). Journal of Vertebrate Paleontology 5:pp111–127.
- Erickson BR. (1982). Wannaganosuchus, a new alligator from the Paleocene of North America. Journal of Paleontology 56:pp492–506.
- Erickson BR. (1968). A Claw of Megalonyx (Ground Sloth) from Minnesota. Volume 1: Paleontology:pp8.
- Erickson BR. (1967). Paleontological Evidence Concerning Some Post Glacial Features of The Mississippi River Valley. 1:pp1–4
- Erickson BR. (1966). Mounted Skeleton of Triceratops prorsus. The Science Museum 1:pp1–15.
