= Paleornithology =

Scientific study of bird evolution and fossil birds

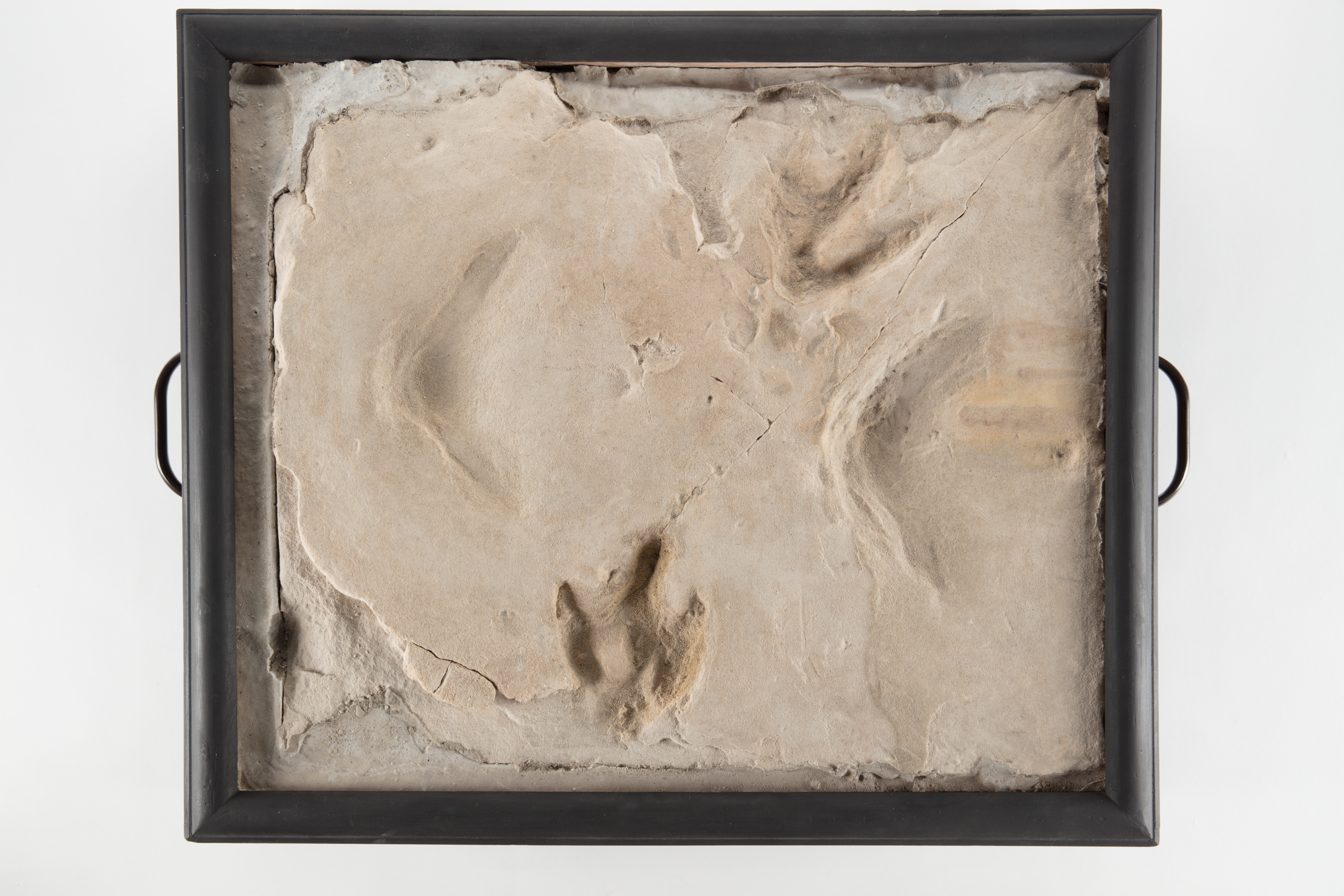
Ichnofossil of a moa footprint from the Gisborne District, New Zealand

Paleornithology, also known as avian paleontology, is the scientific study of bird evolution and fossil birds. It is a hybrid of ornithology and paleontology. Paleornithology began with the discovery of Archaeopteryx. The reptilian relationship of birds and their ancestors, the theropod dinosaurs, are important aspects of paleornithological research. Other areas of interest to paleornithologists are the early sea-birds Ichthyornis, Hesperornis, and others. Notable paleornithologists are Storrs L. Olson, Alexander Wetmore, Alan Feduccia, Cécile Mourer-Chauviré, Philip Ashmole, Pierce Brodkorb, Trevor H. Worthy, Zhou Zhonghe, Yevgeny Kurochkin, Bradley C. Livezey, Gareth J. Dyke, Luis M. Chiappe, Gerald Mayr and David Steadman.
