= Eugen Kessler =

Romanian biologist and palaeo-ornithologist

- Jenő Attila Kessler
- Born: 23 December 1939 (age 86); Turda, Kingdom of Romania
- Education: Babeș-Bolyai University
- Known for: Research on fossil birds of the Carpathian Basin
- Scientific career
- Fields: Biology, palaeornithology
- Workplaces: Babeș-Bolyai University; Eötvös Loránd University

Jenő Attila Kessler (born 23 December 1939), commonly known as Eugen Kessler, is a Romanian biologist, palaeo-ornithologist, non-fiction author and academic. His research focuses on the fossil bird fauna of Romania and the Carpathian Basin, as well as the origin and evolution of birds.

== Biography ==
Kessler worked as a porcelain painter in a porcelain factory from 1955 to 1958. He subsequently completed his secondary education at the Brassai Sámuel Theoretical Lyceum in Cluj-Napoca. He studied biology and geology at the Babeș-Bolyai University, graduating in 1963. Between 1963 and 1965, he worked as a teacher in Felsőrákos. From 1965 to 1970, he taught at the Faculty of Medicine in Oradea, followed by a teaching position at Primary School No. 13 until 1990. From 1990 to 1991, he taught at the Ady Endre Lyceum.

In 1991, Kessler became an assistant professor at the Faculty of Biology and Geology of Babeș-Bolyai University. He was promoted to associate professor in 1994 and professor in 1998. His teaching subjects included vertebrate zoology, comparative anatomy, autopsy, functional anatomy and biomechanics, ornithology, and ethology. He retired in 2002 and settled in Hungary. Subsequently, he became a lecturer at the Institute of Palaeontology of Eötvös Loránd University, where he taught courses in applied anatomy, dinosaurs and prehistoric birds.

Kessler began his research in 1969 under the supervision of palaeontologist Tibor Jurcsák, working as an external collaborator at the Natural History Department of the Țării Crișurilor Museum in Oradea. In 1977, he received his doctorate from the Faculty of Biology of the University of Bucharest. His research interests include the Mesozoic, Tertiary and Quaternary avifauna of Romania and the Carpathian Basin, as well as the origin and evolution of birds.

He has published his findings in scientific and educational articles and presented them at numerous conferences. Among his most significant contributions was the description of three bird taxa from the Early Cretaceous deposits of a bauxite mine near Cornet, close to Oradea. He has also studied fossil bird bones from sites in Romania, Hungary, the Republic of Moldova, Turkey, Slovakia and Serbia.

== Taxa described by Eugen Kessler (selection) ==
- Palaeocursornithiformes
- Palaeocursornithidae
- Eurolimnornithidae
- Palaeocursornis, including Palaeocursornis biharicus
- Eurolimnornis, including Eurolimnornis corneti
- Cygnopterus neogradensis
- Tadorna minor
- Clangula matraensis
- Mergus minor
- Aythya denesi
- Gavia moldavica
- Miodytes, including Miodytes serbicus
- Podiceps miocenicus
- Podiceps csarnotatus
- Rupelornis harmati
- Diomedea rumana
- Heliadornis minor
- Sarmatosula, including Sarmatosula dobrogensis
- Morus olsoni
- Ciconia sarmatica
- Otis bessarabicus
- Heliornis sumeghensis
- Rallicrex litkensis
- Zapornia kretzoii
- Porzana matraensis
- Ortyxelos janossyi
- Tringa grigorescui
- Charadrius lambrechti
- Pandion pannonicus
- Glaucidium baranensis
- Cuculus pannonicus
- Eurystomus beremedensis
- Picus pliocaenicus
- Oriolus beremendensis
- Lanius schreteri
- Lanius capeki
- Lanius hungaricus
- Lanius major
- Lanius intermedius
- Corvus harkanyensis
- Corvus simionescui
- Parus robustus
- Parus parvulus
- Parus medius
- Sylvosimadaravis janossyi
- Calandrella gali
- Melanocorypha minor
- Lullula neogradensis
- Lullula minor
- Lullula parva
- Lullula minuscula
- Praealauda, including Praealauda hevesensis
- Alauda tivadari
- Galerida cserhatensis

== Books ==
- Kessler, Jenő. 1997. Ornitológia. University textbook for biology students. Stúdium Kiadó, Erdélyi Tankönyvtanács, Cluj-Napoca. ISBN 973-9258-30-1.
- Kessler, Jenő. 1998. Etológia. Stúdium Kiadó, Erdélyi Tankönyvtanács, Cluj-Napoca.
- Kessler, Jenő. 1998. A gerincesek rendszertana, törzsfejlődése és összehasonlító bonctana. University textbook for biology students. Stúdium Kiadó, Erdélyi Tankönyvtanács, Cluj-Napoca. ISBN 973-9422-01-2.
- Kessler, Jenő and Kis, Erika. 2000. Az emberi test anatómiája. Erdélyi Tankönyvtanács, Ábel Kiadó, Cluj-Napoca. ISBN 973-99814-9-6.
- Kessler, Jenő. 2012. Egy biológus eretnek gondolatai. Publio Kiadó, Budapest. ISBN 978-615-5275-10-4.
- Kessler, Jenő. 2013. Kárpát-medence madárvilágának őslénytani kézikönyve. Könyvműhely Kiadó, Miskolc. ISBN 978-963-08-5742-0.
- Kessler, Jenő. 2015. Dinoszauruszok és ősmadarak. Publio Kiadó, Budapest. ISBN 978-963-424-431-8.

== Selected scientific articles ==
- Grigorescu, D. and Kessler, E. 1977. "The Middle Sarmatian avian fauna of South Dobrogea". Revue Roumaine de Géologie, Géophysique et Géographie – Série de Géologie 21: 93–108.
- Grigorescu, D. and Kessler, E. 1980. "A new specimen of Elopteryx nopcsai Andrews from the dinosaurian beds of Hațeg Basin". Revue Roumaine de Géologie, Géophysique et Géographie – Série de Géologie 24: 171–175.
- Grigorescu, D. and Kessler, E. 1988. "New contributions to the knowledge of the Sarmatian birds from South Dobrogea in the frame of Eastern Paratethyan avifauna". Revue Roumaine de Géologie, Géophysique et Géographie – Série de Géologie 32: 91–97.
- Kessler, E. and Jurcsák, T. 1984. "Fossil bird remains in the bauxite from Cornet (Romania, Bihor county)". Travaux du Muséum d’Histoire naturelle Grigore Antipa 25: 393–401.
- Kessler, E. and Jurcsák, T. 1986. "New contributions to the knowledge of the Lower Cretaceous bird remains from Cornet (Romania)". Travaux du Muséum d’Histoire naturelle Grigore Antipa 27: 289–295.
- Kessler, E. and Gál, E. 1996. "New taxa in the Neogene bird fauna from Eastern Paratethys". Studia Universitatis Babeș-Bolyai, Series Biologia 41/2: 73–79.
- Gál, E., Hír, J., Kessler, E., Kókay, J., Mészáros, L. and Venczel, M. 1999. "Middle Miocene fossils from Mátraszőlős 1 (Hungary)". Nógrád Megyei Múzeumok Évkönyve 23: 41–48.
- Gál, E., Hír, J., Kessler, E., Kókay, J., Mészáros, L. and Venczel, M. 2000. "Middle Miocene fossils from the road cutting beneath the Rákóczi Chapel at Mátraszőlős. II. The Mátraszőlős 2 locality". Folia Historico Naturalia Musei Matraensis 24: 39–75.
- Dimitrijević, V., Gál, E. and Kessler, E. 2002. "A new genus and new species of grebe (Podicipediformes, Aves) from the Early Miocene lake deposits of Valjevo Basin (Serbia)". Fragmenta Palaeontologica Hungarica 20: 3–7.
- Kessler, E., Grigorescu, D. and Csiki, Z. 2005. "Elopteryx revisited – a new bird-like specimen from the Maastrichtian of the Hațeg Basin (Romania)". Acta Palaeontologica Romaniae 5: 249–258.
- Kessler, J. 2008. "The formation of the avifauna of the Carpathian Basin in the light of the results of centuries of palaeo-ornithological research". Magyar Tudomány 2008/10: 1220–1227.
- Kessler, E. 2009. "The oldest modern bird (Ornithurinae) remains from the Early Oligocene of Hungary". Fragmenta Palaeontologica Hungarica 27: 93–96.
- Kessler, E. and Hír, J. 2009. "A new anserid species from the Neogene of Hungary". Fragmenta Palaeontologica Hungarica 27: 97–101.
- Kessler, J. 2009. "Bird evolution: speciation, species lifespan, extinction or change?" Magyar Tudomány 2009/5: 586–596.
- Kessler, J. 2009. "New results on the Neogene and Quaternary bird fauna of the Carpathian Basin", parts I and II. Földtani Közlöny 139/1: 67–82; 139/3: 445–468.
- Kessler, E. and Venczel, M. 2009. "Bird remains from the Middle Miocene of Subpiatră (western Romania)". Nymphaea 36: 27–36.
- Kessler, J. 2010. "New results on the Neogene and Quaternary bird fauna of the Carpathian Basin", part III. Földtani Közlöny 140/1: 53–72.
- Kessler, J. 2010. "Bird origin and evolution from a new perspective". Magyar Tudomány 2010/6: 650–662.
- Kessler, E. 2013. "Neogene songbirds (Aves, Passeriformes) faunae from Hungary". Hantkeniana: 37–149.
- Kessler, J. (E). 2014. "Fossil and subfossil bird remains and faunas from Carpathian Basin". Ornis Hungarica 22 (2): 65–125.
- Kessler, J. (E). 2015. "Osteological guide of songbirds from Central Europe". Ornis Hungarica 23 (2): 62–155.
- Kessler, J. and Hír, J. 2012. "The bird fauna of northern Hungary in the Miocene", parts I and II. Földtani Közlöny 142/1: 67–78; 141/2: 149–168.
- Kessler, E. and Venczel, M. 2011. "A new passeriform bird from the Middle Miocene of Subpiatră (western Romania)". Nymphaea, Folia naturae Bihariae XXXVIII: 17–22.
