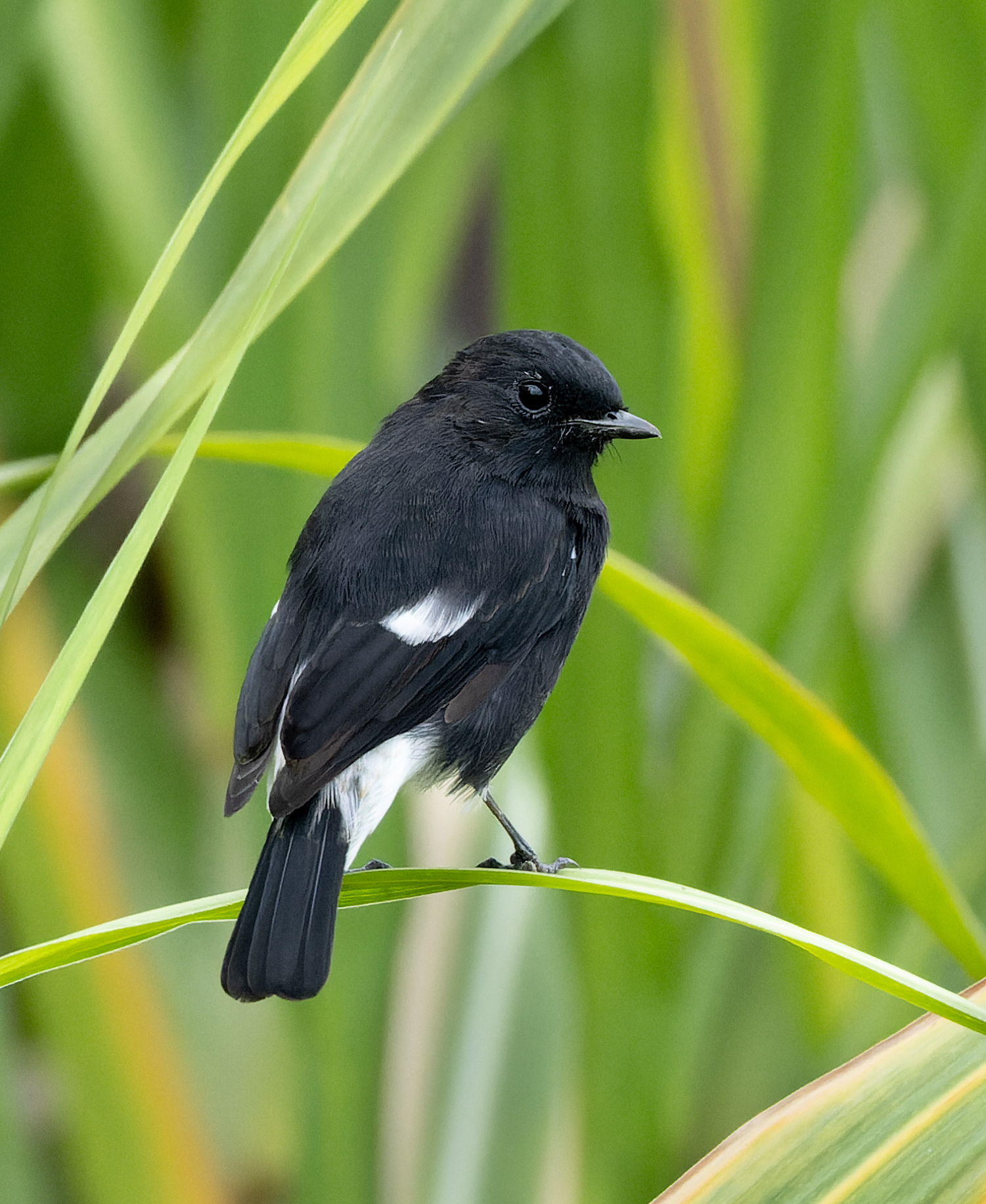
- Male in Bhigwan, Maharashtra, India.

Conservation status
- Least Concern (IUCN 3.1)

Scientific classification
- Kingdom: Animalia
- Phylum: Chordata
- Class: Aves
- Order: Passeriformes
- Family: Muscicapidae
- Genus: Saxicola
- Species: S. caprata

Binomial name
- Saxicola caprata (Linnaeus, 1766)

Synonyms
- Motacilla caprata Linnaeus, 1766; Pratincola caprata (Linnaeus, 1766)

= Pied bush chat =

Species of bird

The pied bush chat (Saxicola caprata) is a small passerine bird found ranging from West Asia and Central Asia to the Indian subcontinent and Southeast Asia. About sixteen subspecies are recognized through its wide range with many island forms. It is a familiar bird of countryside and open scrub or grassland where it is found perched at the top of short thorn trees or other shrubs, looking out for insect prey. They pick up insects mainly from the ground, and were, like other chats, placed in the thrush family Turdidae, but are now considered as Old World flycatchers.

They nest in cavities in stone walls or in holes in an embankment, lining the nest with grass and animal hair. The males are black with white shoulder and vent patches whose extent varies among populations. Females are predominantly brownish while juveniles are speckled.

== Taxonomy ==
In 1760 the French zoologist Mathurin Jacques Brisson included a description of the pied bush chat in his Ornithologie based on a specimen collected from the island of Luzon in the Philippines. He used the French name Le traquet de l'Isle de Luçon and the Latin Rubetra Lucionensis. Although Brisson coined Latin names, these do not conform to the binomial system and are not recognised by the International Commission on Zoological Nomenclature. When in 1766 the Swedish naturalist Carl Linnaeus updated his Systema Naturae for the twelfth edition, he added 240 species that had been previously described by Brisson. One of these was the pied bush chat. Linnaeus included a brief description, coined the binomial name Motacilla caprata and cited Brisson's work. The specific epithet caprata is from a local name in Luzon which according to Brisson was Maria-capra. This species is now placed in the genus Saxicola that was introduced by the German naturalist Johann Matthäus Bechstein in 1802. There are 16 recognised subspecies.

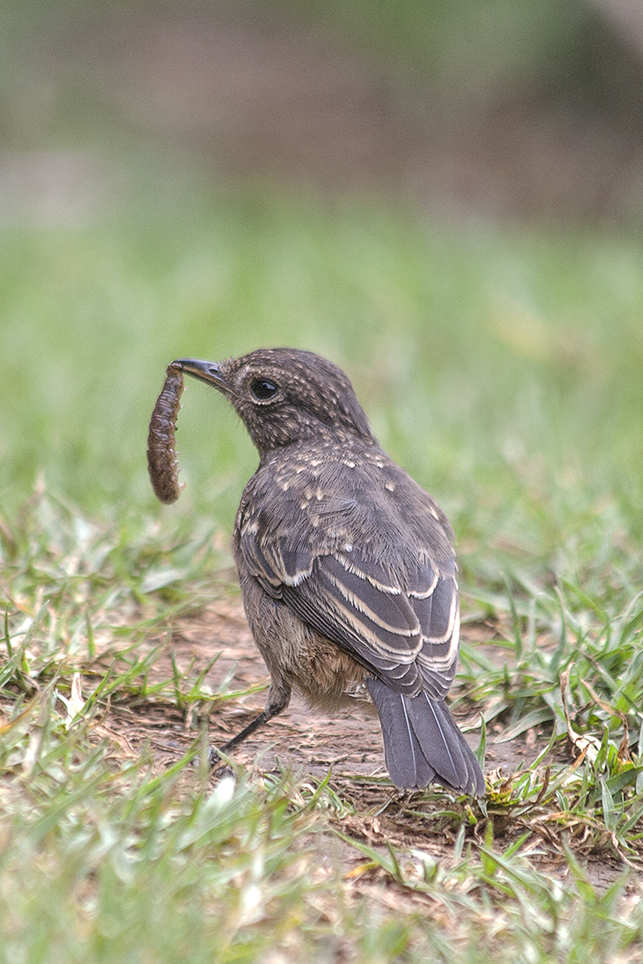
immature S. c. bicolor
with an insect

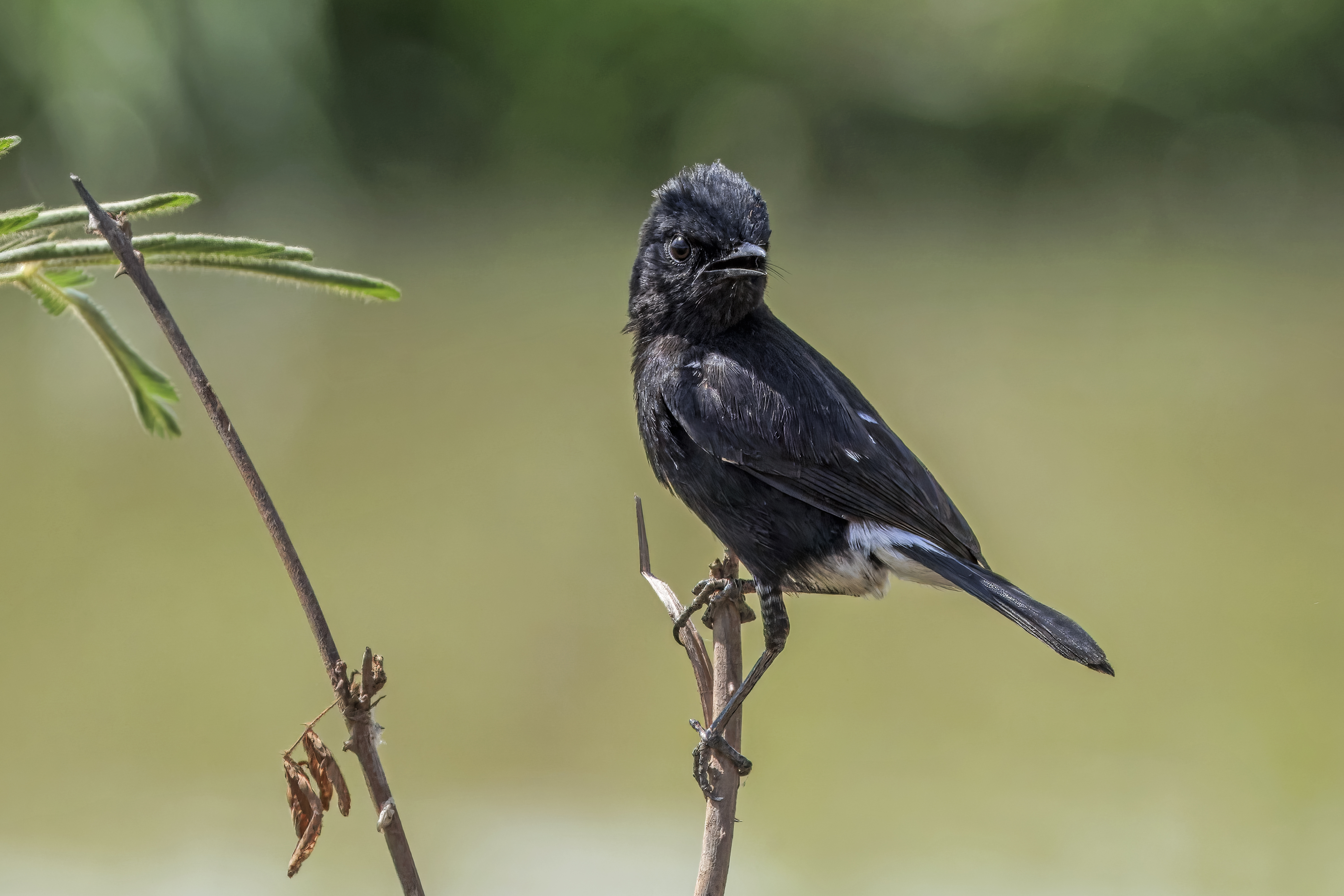
male S. c. burmanicus
Cambodia

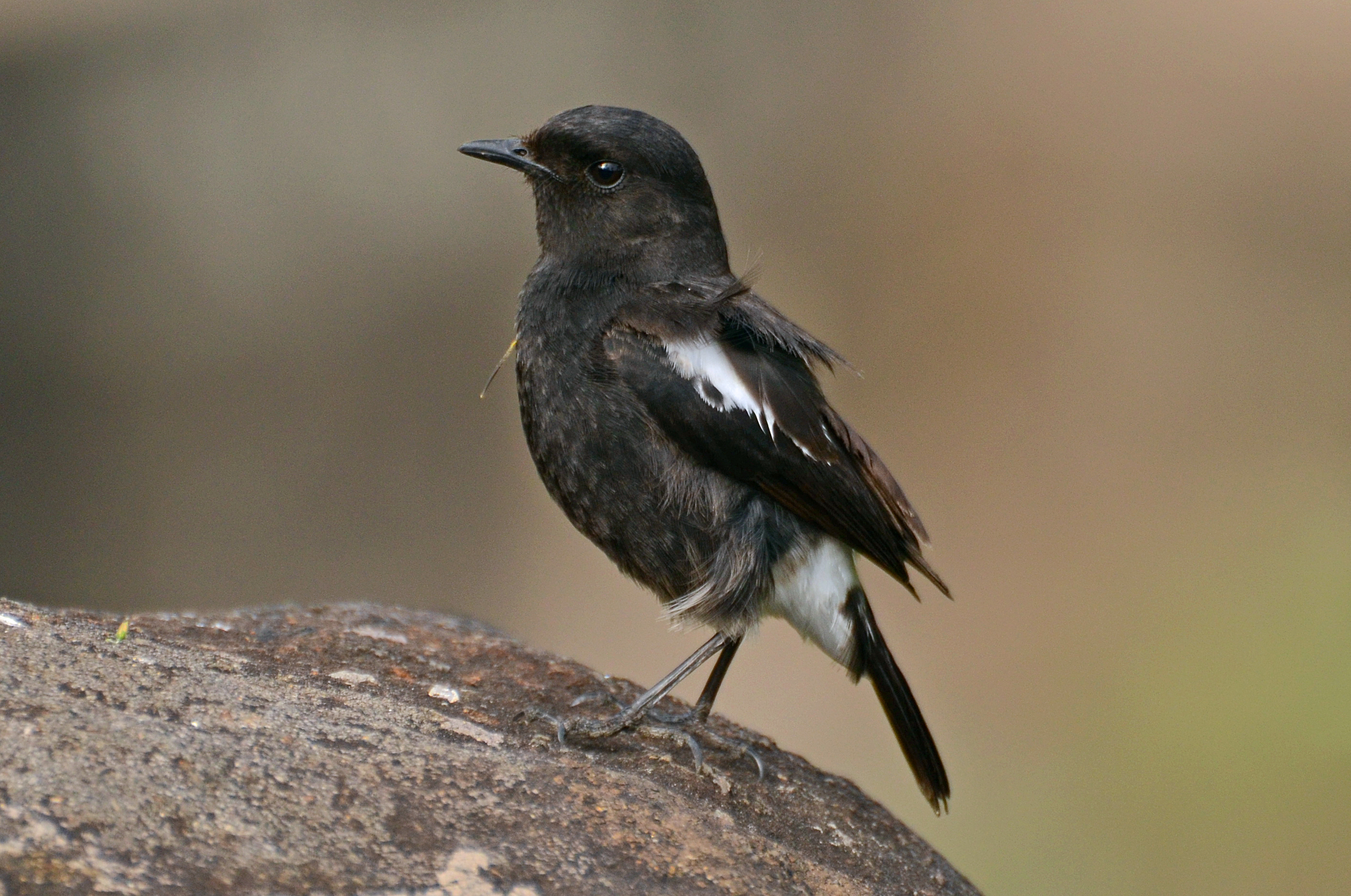
male S. c. nilgiriensis
Nilgiri mountains

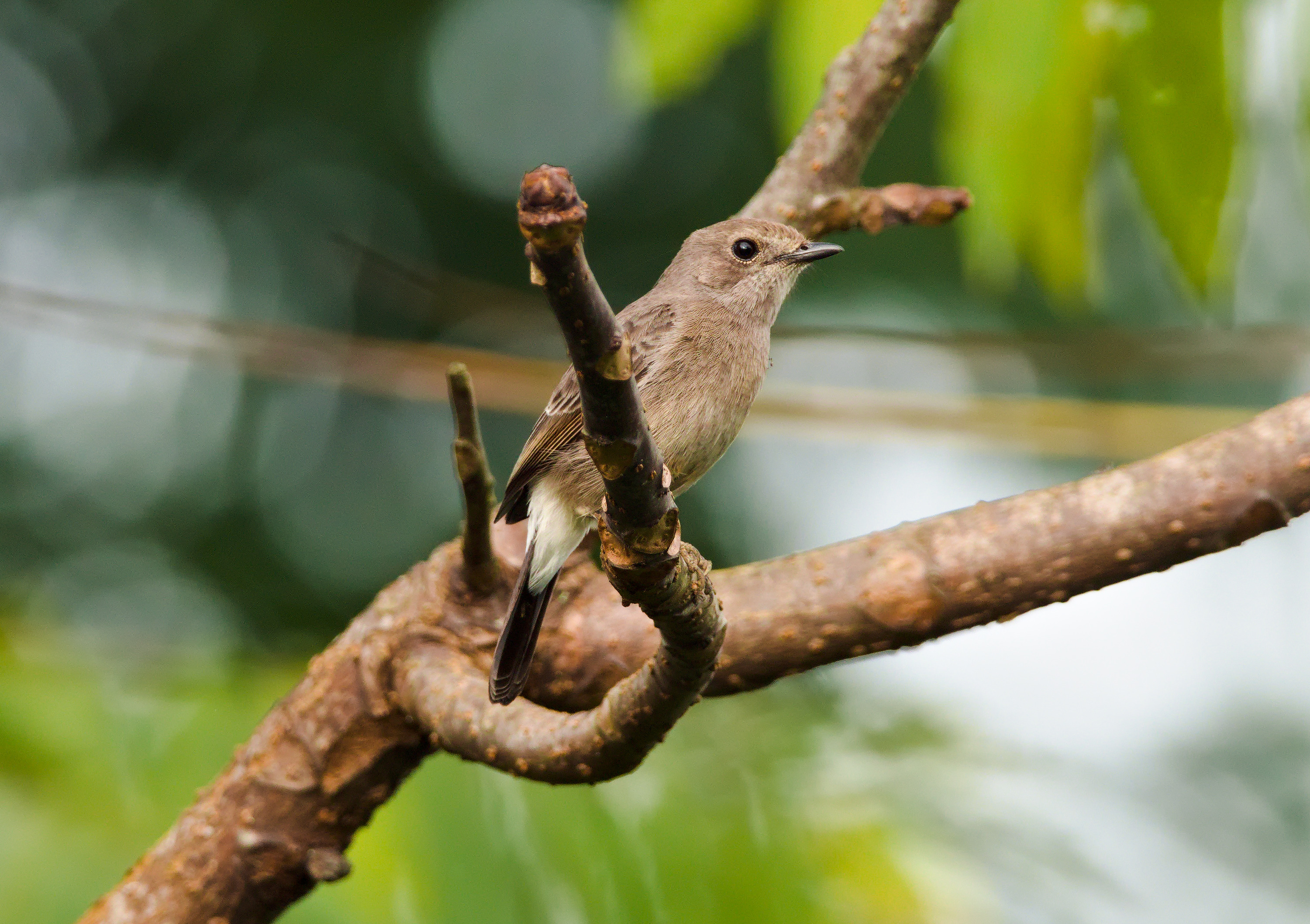
female S. c. albononatus
South Sulawesi

== Description ==
At 13 cm (5.1 in), the pied bush chat is slightly smaller than the Siberian stonechat, Saxicola maurus, although it has a similar dumpy structure and upright stance. The male is black except for a white rump, wing patch and lower belly. The iris is dark brown, the bill and legs black. The female is drab brown and slightly streaked. Juveniles have a scaly appearance on the underside but dark above like the females.

A number of geographic populations have been given subspecies status:

- nominate caprata (Linnaeus, 1766) is found in Luzon and Mindoro, in the Philippines.
- rossorum (Hartert, 1910) is found in NE Iran SC Kazakhstan S to Afghanistan and Baluchistan; migrant in SW Asia (vagrant in Arabia, Israel).(shows more white below than bicolor, described by Hartert, Jour. f. Orn. 1910:180 but not always recognized)
- bicolor Sykes, 1832 is found in SE Iran, Afghanistan, Pakistan and N India; migrating to central India and possibly southern India.
- burmanicus Stuart Baker, 1922 is found in peninsular India E to Myanmar and S China (S Sichuan, Yunnan), S to Thailand and Indochina. This has the white on the abdomen restricted towards the vent.
- nilgiriensis Whistler, 1940 is found in the Western Ghats and the Nilgiri Hills.
- atratus (Blyth, 1851) is restricted to Sri Lanka. This has a large bill.

Some of these isolated populations are found on islands and they include:

- randi Parkes, 1960 found in the central Philippines (Panay, Negros, Cebu, Bohol, Siquijor).
- anderseni Salomonsen, 1953 found on Leyte and Mindanao, in the Philippines.
- fruticola Horsfield, 1821 found in Java E to Flores and Alor.
- francki Rensch, 1931 is found on the Sumba Islands
- pyrrhonotus (Vieillot, 1818) found in the E Lesser Sundas (Wetar, Kisar, Timor, Savu, Roti).
- albonotatus (Stresemann, 1912) found in Sulawesi (except N peninsula) and Salayer I.
- cognatus Mayr, 1944 on Babar Island.
- belensis Rand, 1940 in WC New Guinea.
- aethiops (P. L. Sclater, 1880) in N New Guinea and Bismarck Archipelago.
- wahgiensis Mayr & Gilliard, 1951 in EC & E New Guinea.

This species is closely related to the European-African stonechat complex. S. c. fruticola from Indonesia (Moyo Island population appeared to be well differentiated from specimens from Lembata Island with a divergence estimated to about 360,000 years ago.), S. c. pyrrhonota from West Timor (Indonesia).

Local names include Kala pidda in Hindi Shyama in Gujarati Kavda gapidda in Marathi Kallu kuruvi in Tamil, Kampa nalanchi in Telugu. The Fore people of New Guinea called it pobogile. They were once popular in Bengal as cage birds. They are still found in the local bird trade of some parts of Southeast Asia.

== Distribution ==
The pied bush chat is a resident breeder in tropical southern Asia from the Greater Middle East through the Indian subcontinent eastwards to Indonesia. They colonized Papua New Guinea around 1950. It is found in open habitats including scrub, grassland and cultivation.

Some populations are partially migratory. A ringed individual of subspecies rossorum has been recovered from Israel. The populations in India also appear to show seasonal movements but the patterns are unclear. Subspecies bicolor is found in peninsular India in winter. In Karwar on the western coast, it is said to appear in October and stay till May but not seen during the rainy season. Said to be absent in the Baroda district of Gujarat from April to September. Claud Buchanan Ticehurst noted that it was a summer visitor to Baluchistan leaving in October and further that the birds from Baluchistan were indistinguishable from rossorum of Turkestan.

== Behaviour and ecology ==
Calls

The breeding season is mainly February to August with a peak in March to June. Males sing from prominent perches. The whistling call is somewhat like that of an Indian robin and has been transcribed as we are tea for two with tea at higher note. The nest is built in a hole in a wall or similar site lined with grass and hair, and two to five eggs are laid. Paired males did not reduce their dawn singing behaviour when their mates were trapped and temporarily excluded from the territory. This study suggests that males use dawn chorus to mediate social relationships with neighbouring males to proclaim an established territory. The eggs are small and broadly oval with pale bluish-white or pinkish ground colour and speckles and blotches towards the broad end. They measure about 0.67 by 0.55 inches (1.7 by 1.4 cm). Eggs are incubated chiefly by the female for 12 to 13 days.

Brood parasitism by the common cuckoo (race bakeri) has been noted to be common in the Shan State of Burma, with the cuckoo visiting the nest at dusk and removing an egg before quickly laying its own. The female has dark brown upperparts and rufous underparts and rump. She has no white wing patches. Juveniles are similar to females. Males display during the breeding season by splaying the tail, fluttering and puffing up the white scapular feathers.

This species is insectivorous, and like other chats hunts from a prominent low perch. They have been noted to feed on Pyralid moths and whitefly.

Nematode parasites in the genus Acuaria have been noted. Adult birds have few predators although bats (Megaderma lyra) and wintering Asio flammeus have been noted to prey on them.

== In culture ==
Among the Toda people in the Nilgiris, the pied bushchat or kāŗpiłc, is a bird of omen and the origin of its white wing patches is described in a story of a dairy priest Piu.f who in the ritual of churning milk forgot to remove the churning stick before fetching water from a stream. The bird attempted to obstruct him by blocking his path but he disregarded it and flicked off butter from his hands. The white spots remained but Piu.f met his death. The Kotas of the Nilgiris have an origin story to explain the sexual dimorphism of the pied bushchat but they consider the "karyvaky" bird to be one that foretells good omen. The Kalam people of Papua New Guinea consider the birds as divine messengers.
