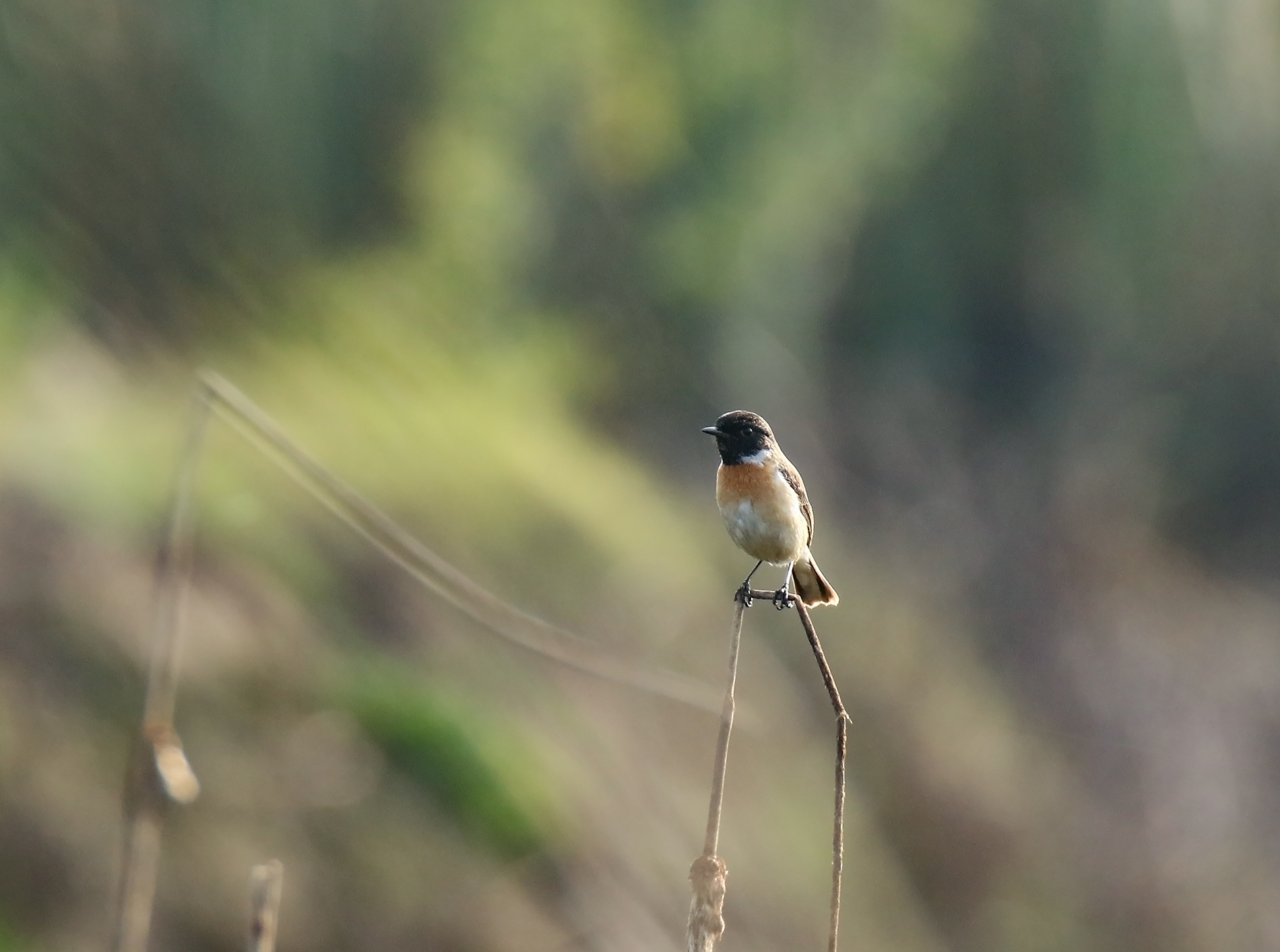

Conservation status
- Least Concern (IUCN 3.1)

Scientific classification
- Kingdom: Animalia
- Phylum: Chordata
- Class: Aves
- Order: Passeriformes
- Family: Muscicapidae
- Genus: Saxicola
- Species: S. leucurus

Binomial name
- Saxicola leucurus (Blyth, 1847)

= White-tailed stonechat =

Species of bird

The white-tailed stonechat (Saxicola leucurus) is a species of bird in the family Muscicapidae.

== Description ==
Very similar in plumage to european stonechat (Saxicola rubicola). The male has black head, white collar and bright rufous chest patch. The back and wings are dark, with white on wing coverts and rump. The key differentiating feature from male common stonechat is the white inner webs of outer tail feathers which is visible when the bird spreads the tail in flight or while landing. Note that this may not be visible when the tail is folded. The female is very similar to female european stonechat, but is overall paler with duller rump, tail and wings.

== Taxonomy and systematics ==
Considered monotypic though there are slight variations in plumage for birds from South Assam Hills (where the birds are darker and large billed) and Pakistan (where chest patch is more reddish). Though sympatric with Asian stonechat in its range, they do not intergrade.

== Distribution and status ==
White-tailed stonechats are resident in suitable marshy habitats in the Indus River valley, southern Himalayan foothills, the Terai–Duar savanna and grasslands, Bangladesh, South Assam Hills, Manipur and Myanmar. They prefer grasslands and marshy areas with tall grass, reeds and tamarisk. They also undertake local movements, based on water availability and possibly for breeding.

== Behaviour and ecology ==
Typical of stonechats, they catch their prey by dropping to ground or making short sallies from their perch. They are generally found in loose pairs, rarely in singles.

Key breeding season is Mar-May when it makes a cup shaped nest in natural depressions on the ground among plants like lotuses or tamarisk.
