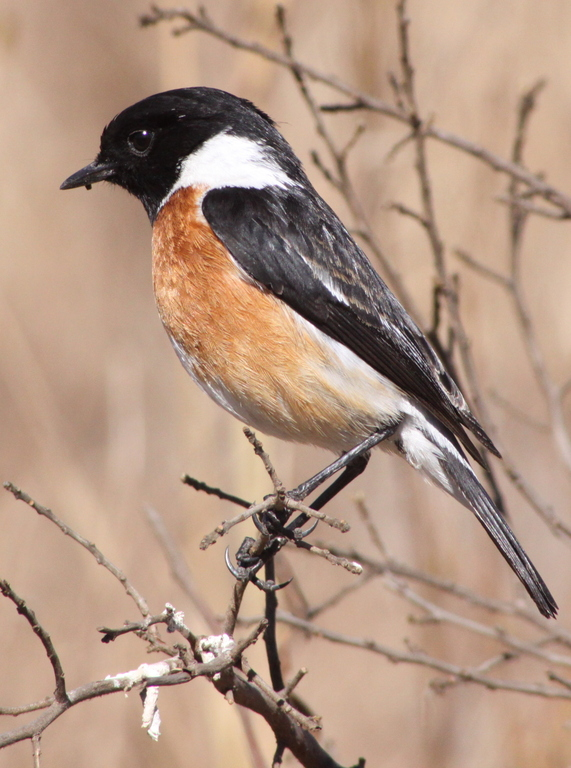
- Adult male in South Africa
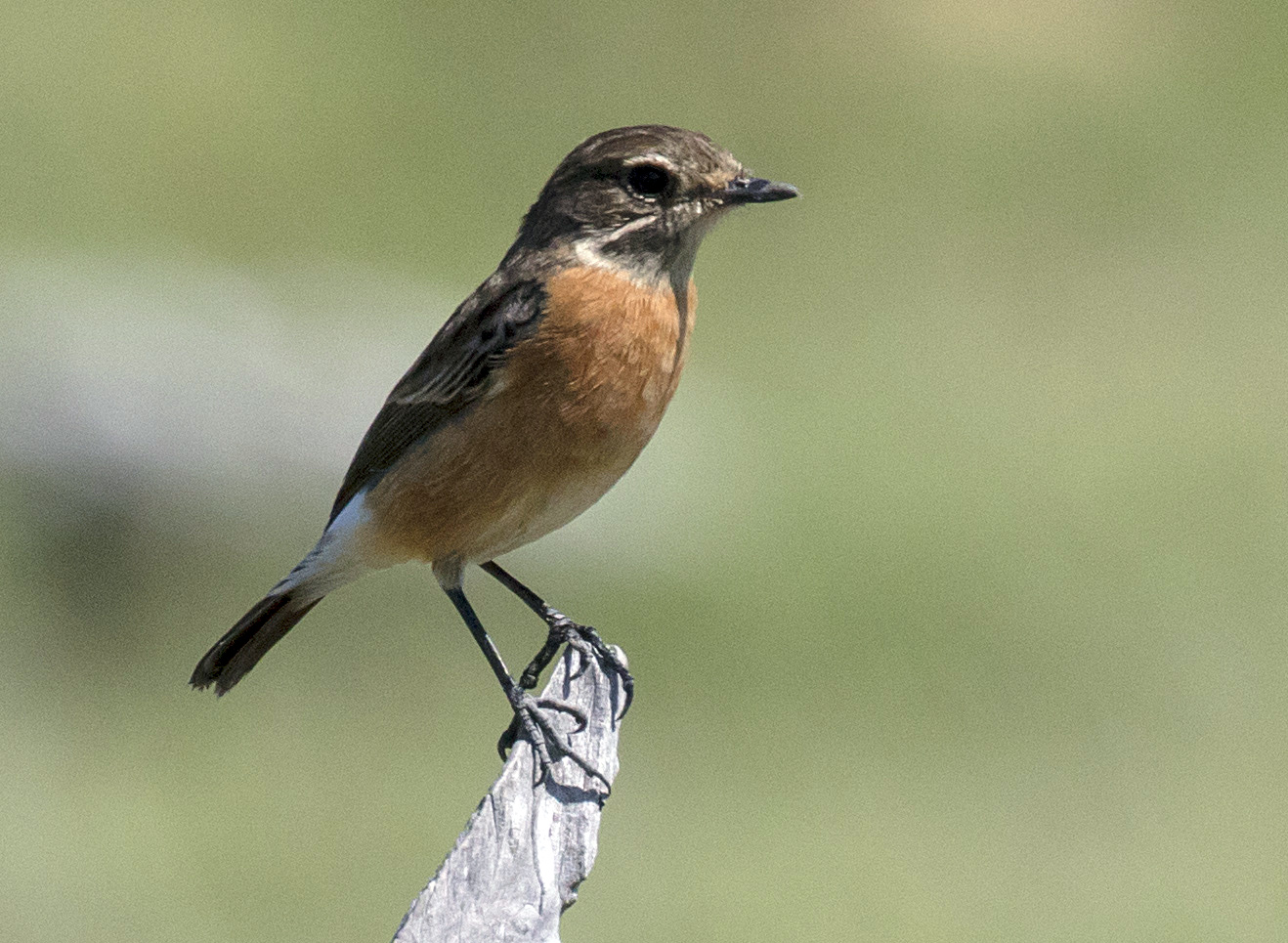
- Adult female in Botswana

Conservation status
- Least Concern (IUCN 3.1)

Scientific classification
- Kingdom: Animalia
- Phylum: Chordata
- Class: Aves
- Order: Passeriformes
- Family: Muscicapidae
- Genus: Saxicola
- Species: S. torquatus

Binomial name
- Saxicola torquatus (Linnaeus, 1766)

Synonyms
- Muscicapa torquata Linnaeus, 1766; Pratincola pallidigula Reichenow, 1892; Saxicola axillaris (Shelley, 1884); Saxicola torquata (lapsus)

= African stonechat =

Species of bird

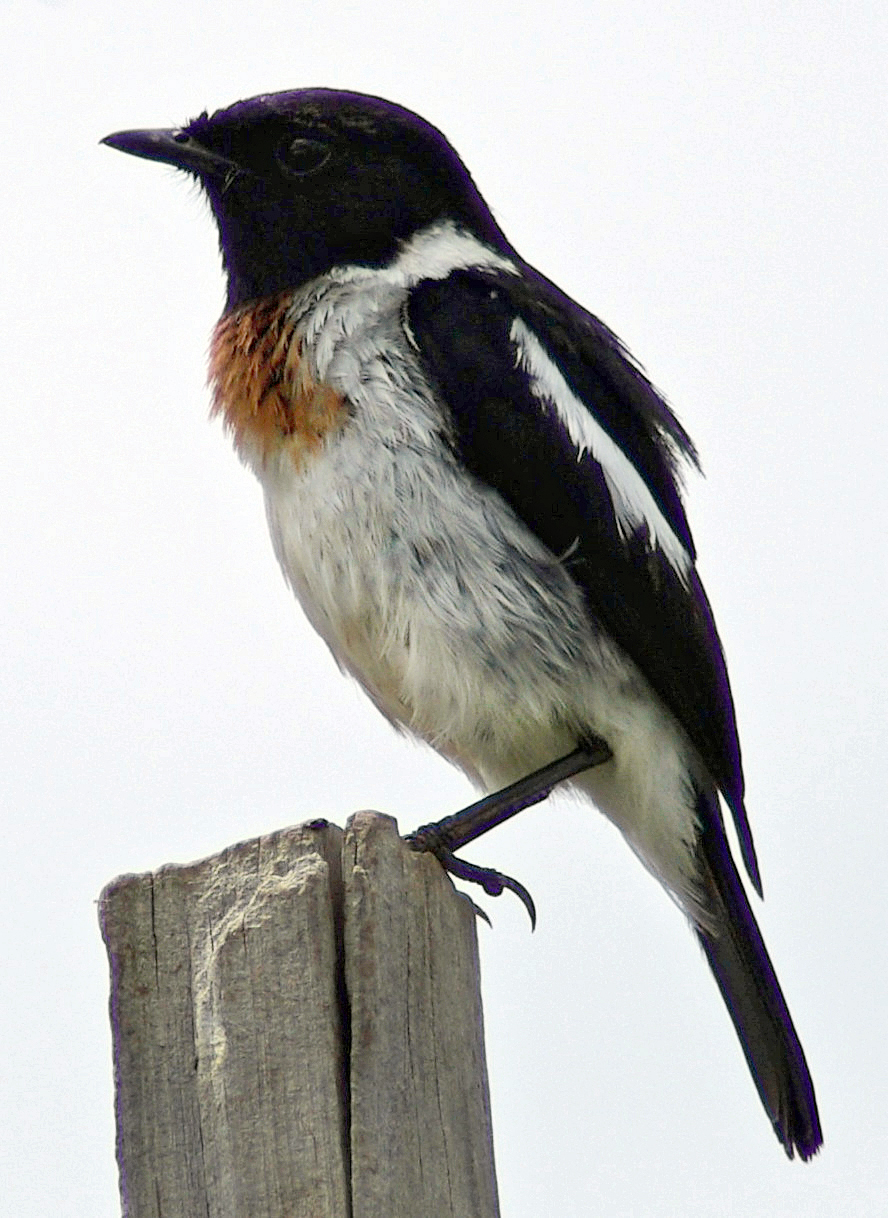
Adult male S. t. axillaris from Kenya

The African stonechat or common stonechat (Saxicola torquatus) is a species of the Old World flycatcher family (Muscicapidae), inhabiting sub-Saharan Africa and adjacent regions. Like the other chats, it was long assigned to the thrush family (Turdidae), to which the chats are convergent. Its scientific name refer to its appearance and habitat and means "collared rock-dweller": Saxicola from Latin saxum ("rock") + incola ("one who dwells in a place"), torquatus, Latin for "collared".

In the past S. torquatus usually referred to the entire "common stonechat" superspecies and some sources still keep it that way, but all available evidence strongly supports full species status for the European (S. rubicola) and the Siberian stonechat (S. maurus) of temperate Eurasia, in addition to the island-endemics Fuerteventura chat (S. dacotiae) and Réunion stonechat (S. tectes) which were never unequivocally accepted into S. torquatus. The Madagascar stonechat (S. t. sibilla) has sometimes been considered distinct. In addition, the well-marked populations of the Horn of Africa uplands may well qualify for an additional species.

== Systematics and taxonomy ==
In 1760, the French zoologist Mathurin Jacques Brisson included a description of the African Stonechat in his Ornithologie based on a specimen collected from the Cape of Good Hope in South Africa. He used the French name Le gobe-mouche à collier du Cap de Bonne Espérance and the Latin Muscicapa Torquata Capitis Bonae Spei. Although Brisson coined Latin names, these do not conform to the binomial system and are not recognised by the International Commission on Zoological Nomenclature. When in 1766 the Swedish naturalist Carl Linnaeus updated his Systema Naturae for the twelfth edition, he added 240 species that had been previously described by Brisson. One of these was the African Stonechat. Linnaeus included a brief description, coined the binomial name Muscicapa torquata and cited Brisson's work. The specific name is from Latin torquatus "collared". This species is now placed in the genus Saxicola that was introduced by the German naturalist Johann Matthäus Bechstein in 1802.

The closest relative of this species are apparently not the Eurasian populations but the Réunion stonechat (S. tectes), but still the "white-collared" Saxicola form a distinct group in the genus. S. torquatus and S. tectes form a sub-Saharan African lineage that diverged from the Eurasian one in the Late Pliocene, roughly 2.5 million years ago. Réunion was colonized shortly thereafter, indicating a rapid expansion along the Indian Ocean coast of Africa. With the Sahara drying out in the subsequent Quaternary glaciation, the African and Eurasian populations became isolated for good.

The recent separation as species was proposed after mtDNA cytochrome b sequence and nDNA microsatellite fingerprinting analysis of specimens of the subspecies Saxicola torquatus axillaris but not S. t. torquatus, and hence this species was briefly known as S. axillaris.

=== Subspecies ===
There are 16 recognised subspecies. They differ slightly in size, and more in the extent of the orange-red on the upper breast of the males, and whether the lower breast is white with a distinct boundary from the upper breast, or pale orange with an indistinct boundary from the darker upper breast. The extent of the orange-red also varies with time of year, often extending on to the belly outside the breeding season.

- S. t. felix Bates, 1936 – southwest Saudi Arabia and west Yemen
- S. t. albofasciatus Rüppell, 1840 – southeast Sudan and northeast Uganda to central Ethiopia

upper breast black, not orange-red

- S. t. jebelmarrae Lynes, 1920 – east Chad and west Sudan
- S. t. moptanus Bates, 1932 – Senegal and south Mali

The smallest subspecies.

- S. t. nebularum Bates, 1930 – Tropical West Africa from Sierra Leone to west Ivory Coast

Extensive orange-red on breast and also flanks.

- S. t. axillaris (Shelley, 1885) – east Democratic Republic of the Congo, Kenya, north and west Tanzania
- S. t. promiscuus Hartert, 1922 – south Tanzania to east Zimbabwe and west Mozambique

Very limited orange-red on uppermost part of breast only.

- S. t. salax (Verreaux, J & Verreaux, E, 1851) – east Nigeria to northwest Angola, Bioko Island
- S. t. stonei Bowen, 1931 – east and south Angola to southwest Tanzania south to north South Africa and Botswana
- S. t. clanceyi Courtenay-Latimer, 1961 – coastal west South Africa
- S. t. torquatus (Linnaeus, 1766) – central South Africa
- S. t. oreobates Clancey, 1956 – Lesotho
- S. t. voeltzkowi Grote, 1926 – Grande Comore
- S. t. sibilla (Linnaeus, 1766) – Madagascar except north, central (Madagascar stonechat group)
- S. t. tsaratananae Milon, 1950 – north Madagascar (Madagascar stonechat group)
- S. t. ankaratrae Salomonsen, 1934 – central Madagascar (Madagascar stonechat group)

The subspecies S. t. sibilla, S. t. tsaratananae and S. t. ankaratrae have sometimes been considered as a separate species, the Madagascar stonechat.

== Description ==
The males have a black head, a white half-collar, a black back, a white rump, and a black tail; the wings are black with a large white patch on the top side of the inner wing. The upper breast is usually dark orange-red, with a sharp or gradual transition to white or pale orange on the lower breast and belly depending on subspecies. In a few, black replaces the orange breast feathers in part or entirely.

Females have brown rather than black above and on the head with an indistinct paler eyebrow line, chestnut-buff rather than orange below, and less white on the wings. Both sexes' plumage is somewhat duller and streakier outside the breeding season.

== Distribution and habitat ==
It has a scattered distribution across much of sub-Saharan Africa, occurring locally as far north as Senegal and Ethiopia. Outlying populations are found the mountains of southwest Arabia and on Madagascar and Grande Comore. It is non-migratory, moving only locally if at all. As a result, it has developed much regional variation, being divided into 13 subspecies.

== Sources ==
- Boulton, Rudyerd & Rand, A.L. (1952). A collection of birds from Mount Cameroon. Fieldiana Zool. 34(5):35-64. Fulltext at the Internet Archive
- Clement, Peter; Rose, Chris (2015). Robins and Chats. Helm Identification Guides. London: Bloomsbury. ISBN 978-0-7136-3963-6.
- Urquhart, Ewan & Bowley, Adam (2002). Stonechats. A Guide to the Genus Saxicola. Christopher Helm, London. ISBN 0-7136-6024-4
- Wittmann, U.; Heidrich, P.; Wink, M. & Gwinner, E. (1995). Speciation in the Stonechat (Saxicola torquata) inferred from nucleotide sequences of the cytochrome b-gene. Journal of Zoological Systematics and Evolutionary Research 33(2):116-122. doi:10.1111/j.1439-0469.1995.tb00218.x HTML abstract
