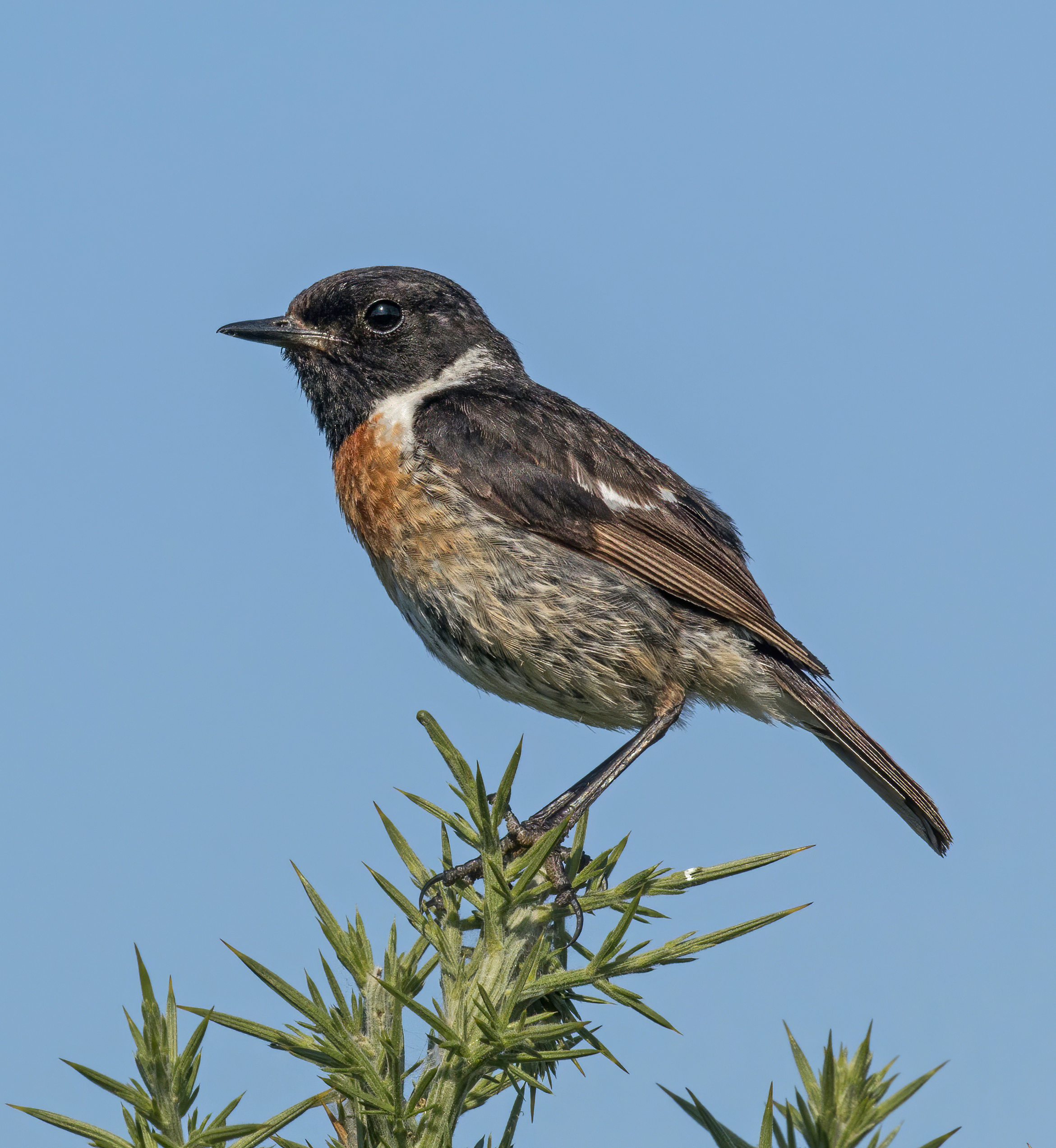
- Male European stonechat (Saxicola rubicola) Calls made by a European stonechat, recorded on Old Dean Common, Surrey, England

Scientific classification
- Kingdom: Animalia
- Phylum: Chordata
- Class: Aves
- Order: Passeriformes
- Family: Muscicapidae
- Genus: Saxicola; Bechstein, 1802

Type species
- Motacilla rubicola Linnaeus, 1766

Species
- See text

= Saxicola =

Genus of birds

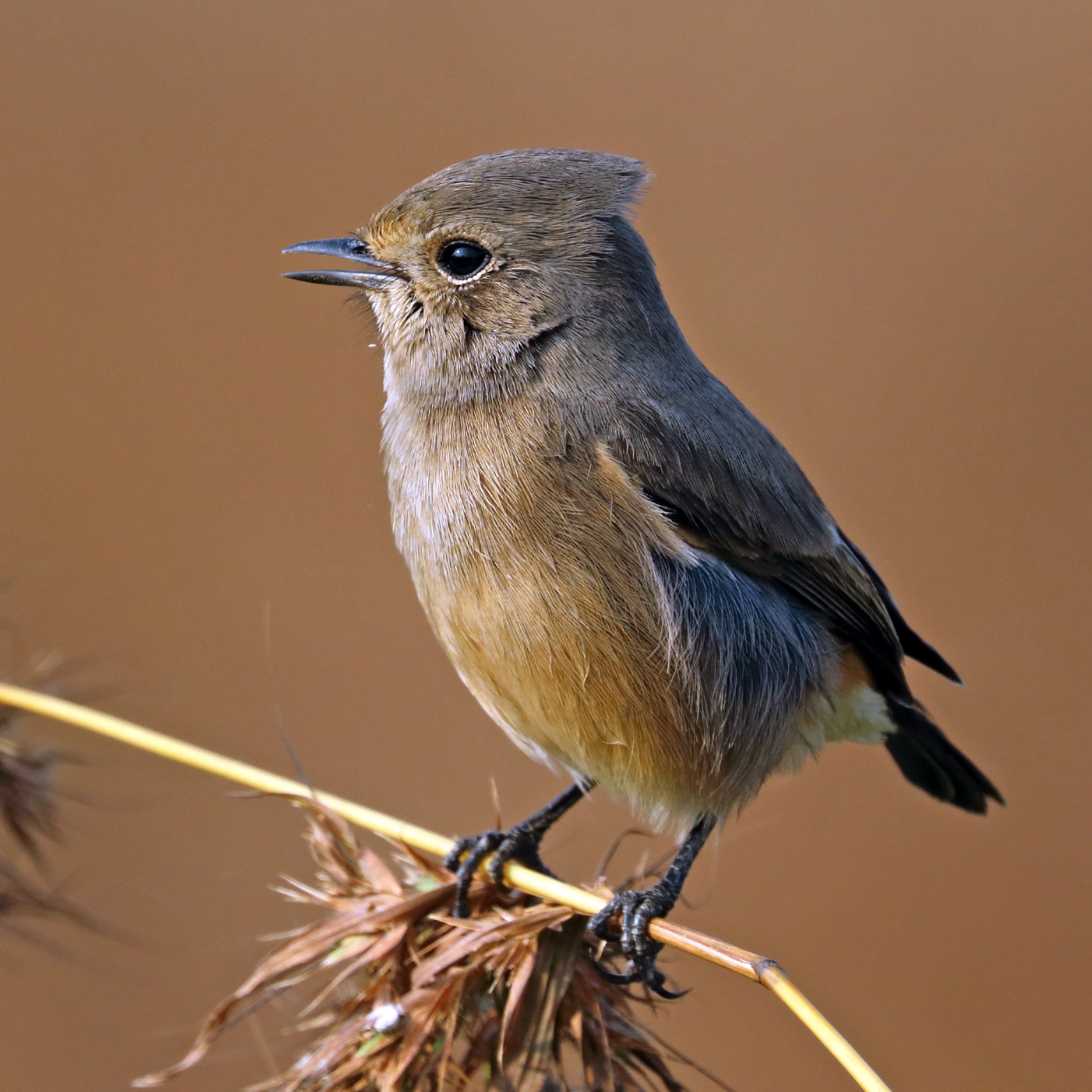
Female pied bushchat (Saxicola caprata bicolor), India

Saxicola (Latin: saxum, rock + incola, dwelling in), the stonechats or chats, is a genus of small passerine birds restricted to the Old World. They are insectivores occurring in open scrubland and grassland with scattered small shrubs. The genus contains 18 species, of which four are prehistoric.

== Taxonomy ==
The genus was introduced by the German naturalist Johann Matthäus Bechstein in 1802. The type species was subsequently designated as the European stonechat. The name Saxicola is from Latin saxum, saxi "stone" and -cola "dweller".

The genus was formerly included in the thrush family Turdidae, but as with several other related genera, has now been shown to be correctly classified in the Old World flycatcher family Muscicapidae, in which it is most closely related to the genera Oenanthe (wheatears) and Campicoloides.

Genetic and behavioural evidence has also resulted in several new species being accepted in the genus in recent years, most notably the splitting of the former broad "species" common stonechat Saxicola torquatus into five species, a change now widely though not yet universally accepted. With addition of mtDNA cytochrome b sequence and nDNA fingerprinting data, it was confirmed that not only the Fuerteventura and Réunion stonechats are distinct species, but that in addition, the African, Madagascar, European, Siberian and Amur stonechats are also all separate species. Due to confusion of subspecies allocation, the name S. torquatus was briefly used for the European species, with the African stonechat being incorrectly listed as S. axillaris.

Owing to misunderstandings of Latin syntax, several species have in the past been widely but incorrectly cited with feminine name endings ("S. torquata, S. maura, S. leucura, S. ferrea", etc.).

=== Species ===
The following 13 species are currently accepted in Saxicola:

Image	Common name	Scientific name	Distribution
	Jerdon's bush chat	Saxicola jerdoni	Eastern Himalaya and Myanmar
	Grey bush chat	Saxicola ferreus	Himalayas, southern China and Indochina
	Whinchat	Saxicola rubetra	western Palearctic; winters to sub-Saharan Africa
	White-browed bush chat	Saxicola macrorhynchus	northwestern India
	White-bellied bush chat	Saxicola gutturalis	Timor
	Pied bush chat	Saxicola caprata	south-central Asia and Indomalaya
	White-throated bush chat	Saxicola insignis	mountains of western Mongolia; winters in the Terai–Duar savanna and grasslands
	White-tailed stonechat	Saxicola leucurus	Indus valley, Himalayan foothills, northeast South Asia and Myanmar
	African stonechat	Saxicola torquatus	Afrotropics
	Réunion stonechat	Saxicola tectes	Réunion
	Siberian stonechat	Saxicola maurus	Siberia and eastern Alpide belt; winters to southern Asia
	European stonechat	Saxicola rubicola	Europe and North Africa; winters to Middle East
	Canary Islands stonechat	Saxicola dacotiae	Fuerteventura

Formerly included in the genus Saxicola, but now treated in a separate genus:

- Splendid fairywren, as Saxicola splendens
- Buff-streaked chat, as Saxicola bifasciatus

=== Fossil record ===
- Saxicola lambrechti (Late Miocene of Polgardi, Hungary)
- Saxicola baranensis (Pliocene of Beremend, Hungary)
- Saxicola parva (Pliocene of Csarnota, Hungary)
- Saxicola magna (Pliocene of Beremend, Hungary)
