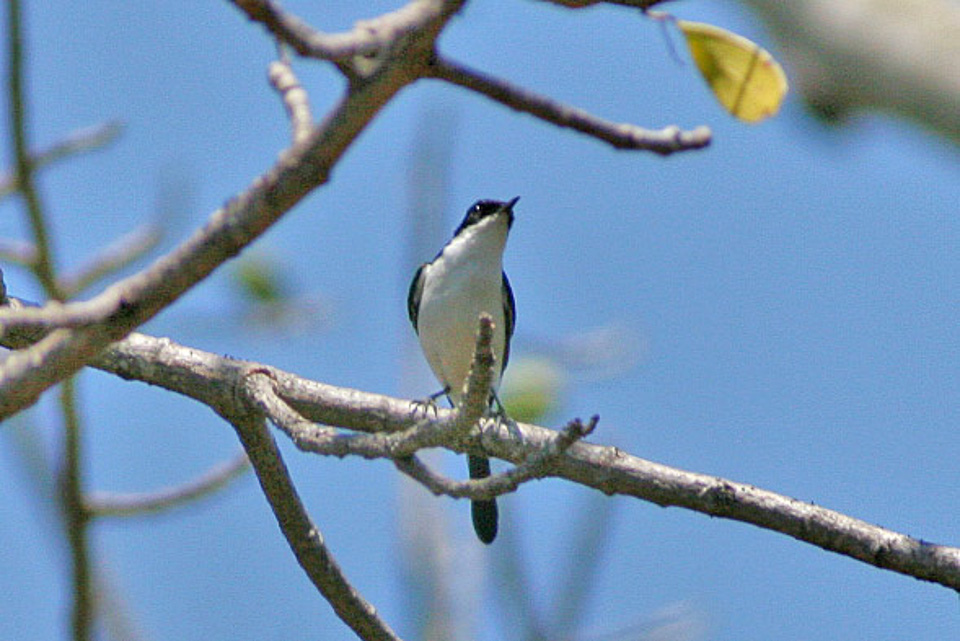

Conservation status
- Least Concern (IUCN 3.1)

Scientific classification
- Kingdom: Animalia
- Phylum: Chordata
- Class: Aves
- Order: Passeriformes
- Family: Muscicapidae
- Genus: Saxicola
- Species: S. gutturalis

Binomial name
- Saxicola gutturalis (Vieillot, 1818)

= White-bellied bush chat =

Species of bird

The white-bellied bush chat (Saxicola gutturalis) is a small bird belonging to the family Muscicapidae, which includes the Old World species of flycatchers. This species is found in parts of Southeast Asia, where it inhabits dry grasslands, open scrublands, and lightly wooded areas. Though sometimes considered locally common, particularly on Timor Island, where it can occupy as much as 20% of the landscape, with some areas having about roughly one breeding pair per hectare.

== Taxonomy ==
The first formal description of this species was provided by Latham in the year 1801. The species is also known as the Timor bushchat, which indicates its main distribution in Timor and the adjacent Lesser Sunda Islands. The genus Saxicola includes small, upright perching birds are commonly referred to as chats or stonechats. These birds are distributed across Europe, Asia, and Africa. The members of this genus belong to the family Muscicapidae, commonly known as the Old World flycatchers. They are distinguished by their preference for open-country habitats and their feeding habits.

== Description ==
The white-bellied bush chat is a small common bird, with a length ranging from approximately 13 to 15 centimetres (5 to 6 in). The species possesses a compact appearance characterized by an upright posture. It is frequently observed perched on low shrubs, grass stems, or fence posts, where it engages in scanning for food sources.

Adult males exhibit distinctive characteristics, including the upper parts that range from dark brown to black, a throat and belly that are white or pale gray, and a dark facial appearance which forms a stark contrast with the lighter underparts. The wings and tail exhibit a dark coloration, with white bases becoming apparent during flight. Females exhibit a paler and browner coloration, characterized by dark-colored underparts and less distinct markings. In contrast, young show a more uneven appearance. The species mainly feeds on insects and several tiny insects, which are taken in from the ground following swift jumps or hops from elevated positions.

== Distribution and habitat ==
The white-bellied bush chat has limited but patchy distribution across Southeast Asia. It is primarily found in Timor-Leste, eastern Indonesia, and a few surrounding Lesser Sunda Islands. It inhabits open dry grasslands, savannas, lightly wooded areas, and occasionally agricultural lands. In Timor, it is relatively common in suitable habitats and frequently observed perching on low vegetation or man-made structures.

== Behavior and ecology ==
The white-bellied bush chat exhibits an uneven distribution across Southeast Asia. Populations have been documented in Timor-Leste, certain regions of Indonesia, and nearby islands. In Timor, the species is relatively common, with its existence sometimes covering as much as 20% of the landscape in appropriate habitats. In certain regions, numbers of around one breeding pair hectare of land have been reported. This species is typically found in dry grasslands, savannas, scrubby clearings, and on occasion, cultivated areas. It is known to perch on low shrubs, grasses, or manufactured structures.

== Conservation status ==
The International Union for Conservation of Nature (IUCN) categorizes the white-bellied bush chat as a species of Least Concern, due to its wide range and stable population numbers, which exceed 50,000 birds. Localized declines may occur as a result of loss of habitat explained by agricultural expansion, grazing procedures and urbanization activities. Populations on Timor and Semau Islands are observed to be relatively common; however, continuous monitoring is essential for evaluating long-term trends.
