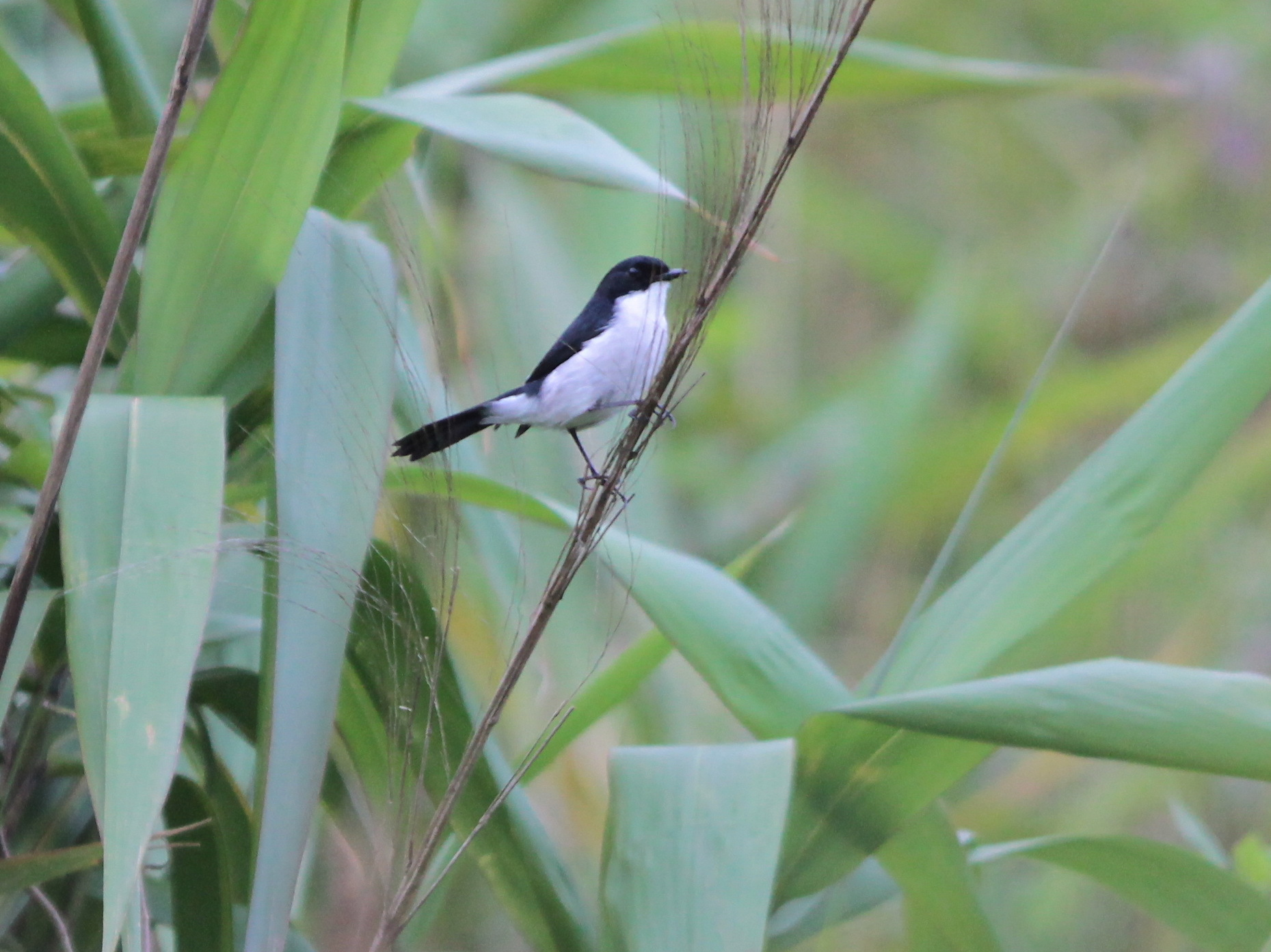
- Male
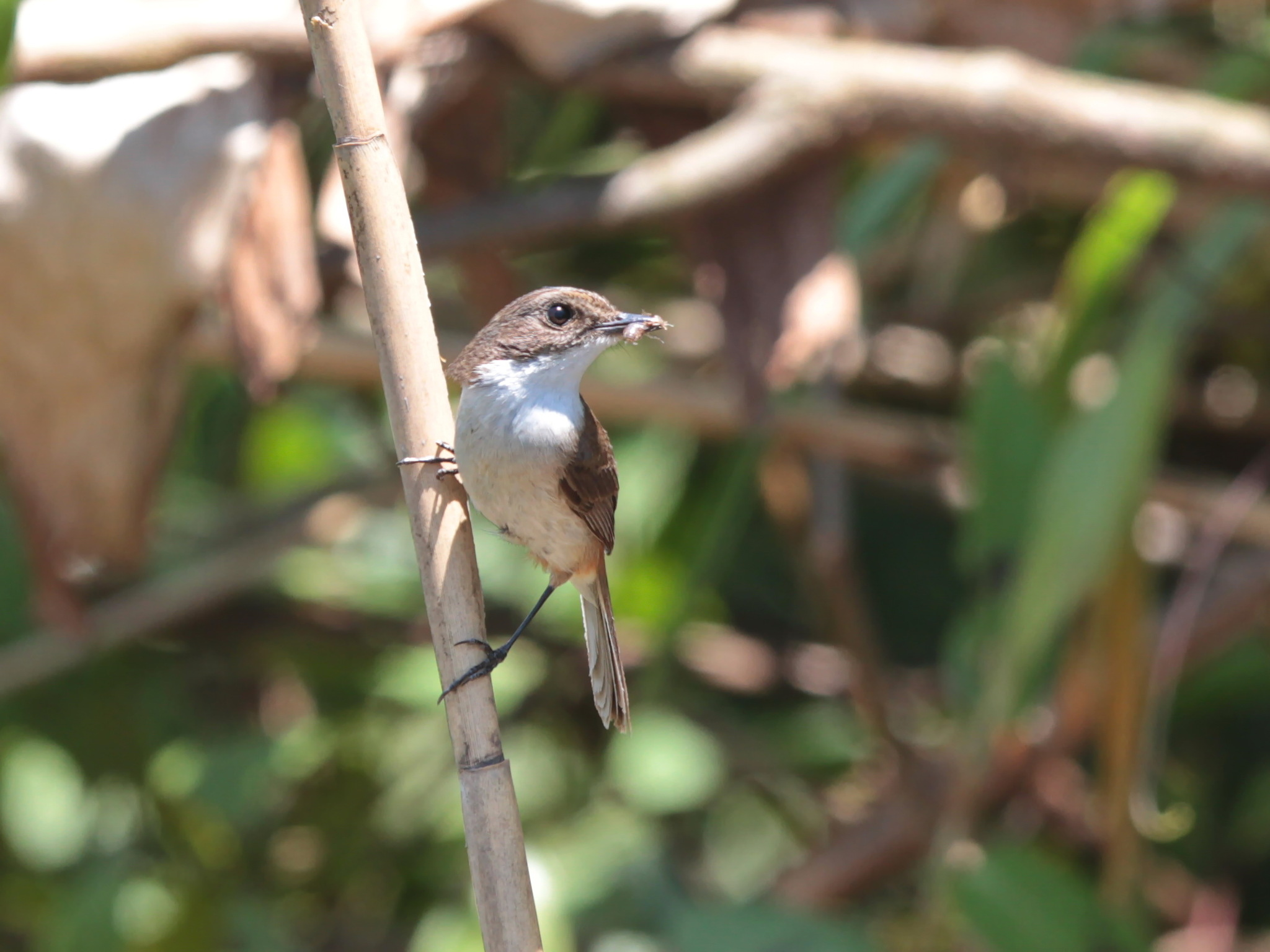
- Female

Conservation status
- Least Concern (IUCN 3.1)

Scientific classification
- Kingdom: Animalia
- Phylum: Chordata
- Class: Aves
- Order: Passeriformes
- Family: Muscicapidae
- Genus: Saxicola
- Species: S. jerdoni

Binomial name
- Saxicola jerdoni (Blyth, 1867)

= Jerdon's bush chat =

Species of bird

Jerdon's bush chat (Saxicola jerdoni) is a species of bird in the family Muscicapidae.

The common name commemorates the surgeon-naturalist Thomas C. Jerdon.

== Distribution ==
The Jerdon's bush chat is native to Bangladesh, China, India, Laos, Nepal, Thailand and Vietnam. It is possibly extinct in Myanmar.

Shuklaphanta National Park in Nepal represents the western limit of its distribution.
