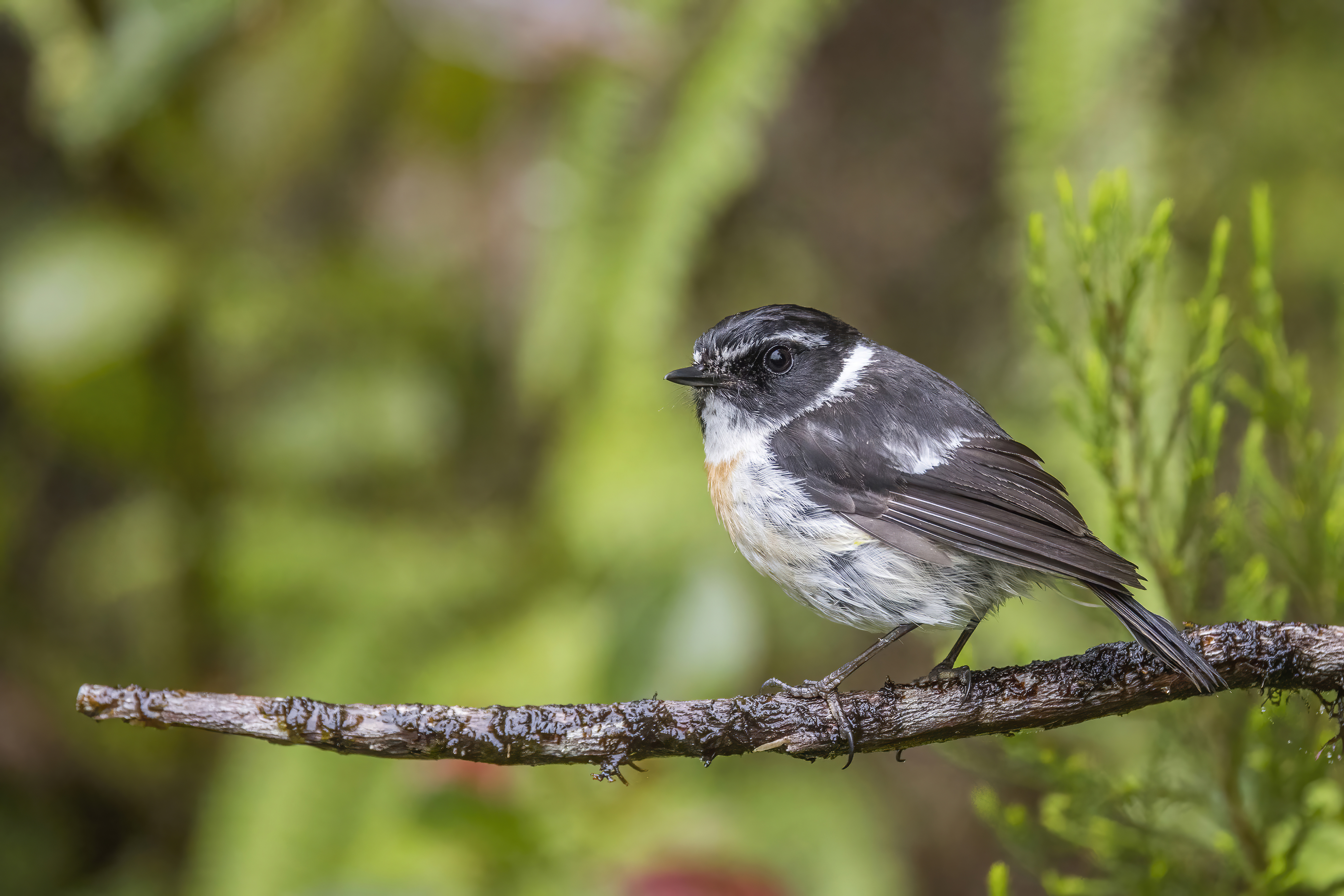
- Male
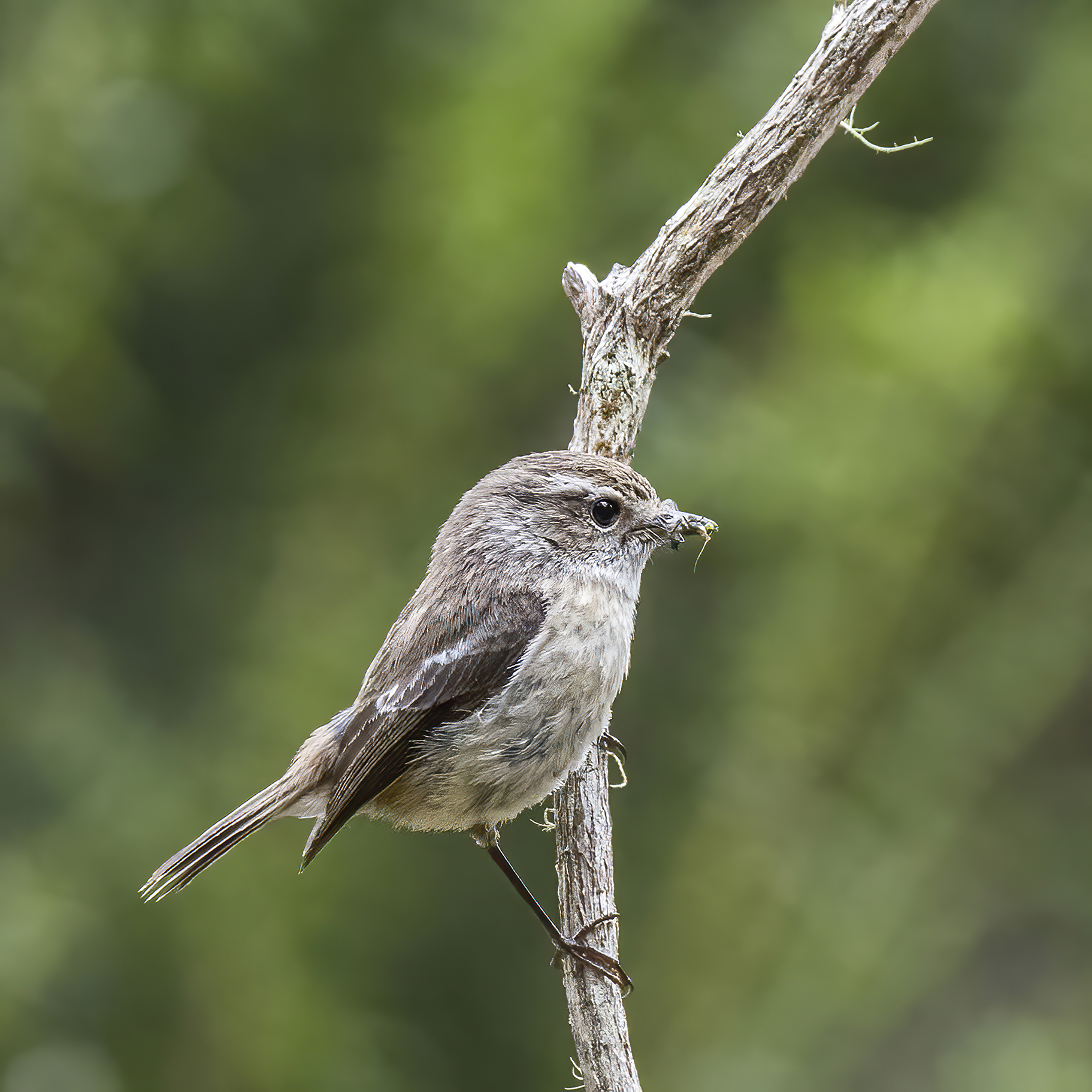
- Female both on the slopes of la Roche Écrite

Conservation status
- Least Concern (IUCN 3.1)

Scientific classification
- Kingdom: Animalia
- Phylum: Chordata
- Class: Aves
- Order: Passeriformes
- Family: Muscicapidae
- Genus: Saxicola
- Species: S. tectes

Binomial name
- Saxicola tectes (Gmelin, JF, 1789)

= Réunion stonechat =

Species of bird

The Réunion stonechat (Saxicola tectes) is a species of stonechat, endemic to the French Indian Ocean island of Réunion. It is found across the island in forests, shrublands and artificial environments such as gardens and plantations. This small passerine bird is common in clearings and open mountain bushlands there up to 2600 metres above sea level, including in the plains around Piton de la Fournaise.

== Taxonomy ==
The Réunion stonechat was formally described in 1789 by the German naturalist Johann Friedrich Gmelin in his revised and expanded edition of Carl Linnaeus's Systema Naturae. He placed it with the flycatchers in the genus Muscicapa and coined the binomial name Muscicapa tectes. Gmelin based his account on "Le gobe-mouche de l'Ilse de Bourbon" that had been described and illustrated in 1760 by the French zoologist Mathurin Jacques Brisson. The Réunion stonechat is now placed in the genus Saxicola that was introduced in 1802 by the German naturalist Johann Matthäus Bechstein. The species is monotypic: no subspecies are recognised. The scientific name is from Saxicola, "rock-dweller", from Latin saxum, a rock + incola, dwelling in; and tectes, onomatopoetic Neo-Latin after the species' call, from the Réunion Creole name tec-tec.

It is a member of the common stonechat superspecies, but it is distinct, together with its closest relative the Madagascar stonechat S. sibilla being insular derivatives of the African stonechat. Its ancestors probably diverged from the sub-Saharan African lineage as it spread across the continent some 2–2.5 mya during the Late Pliocene.

== Description ==
Overall, the male is black above and white below, but also with a white supercilium (sometimes absent), half-collar, and greater covert patch, and a variable-sized orange patch on the breast. Females differ from males in being browner above, more buff-toned below, and often lacking the white greater covert patch. The white throat and (usually white) supercilium are the most prominent external differences from the African stonechat S. torquatus, which has a wholly black head including the throat and supercilium.
