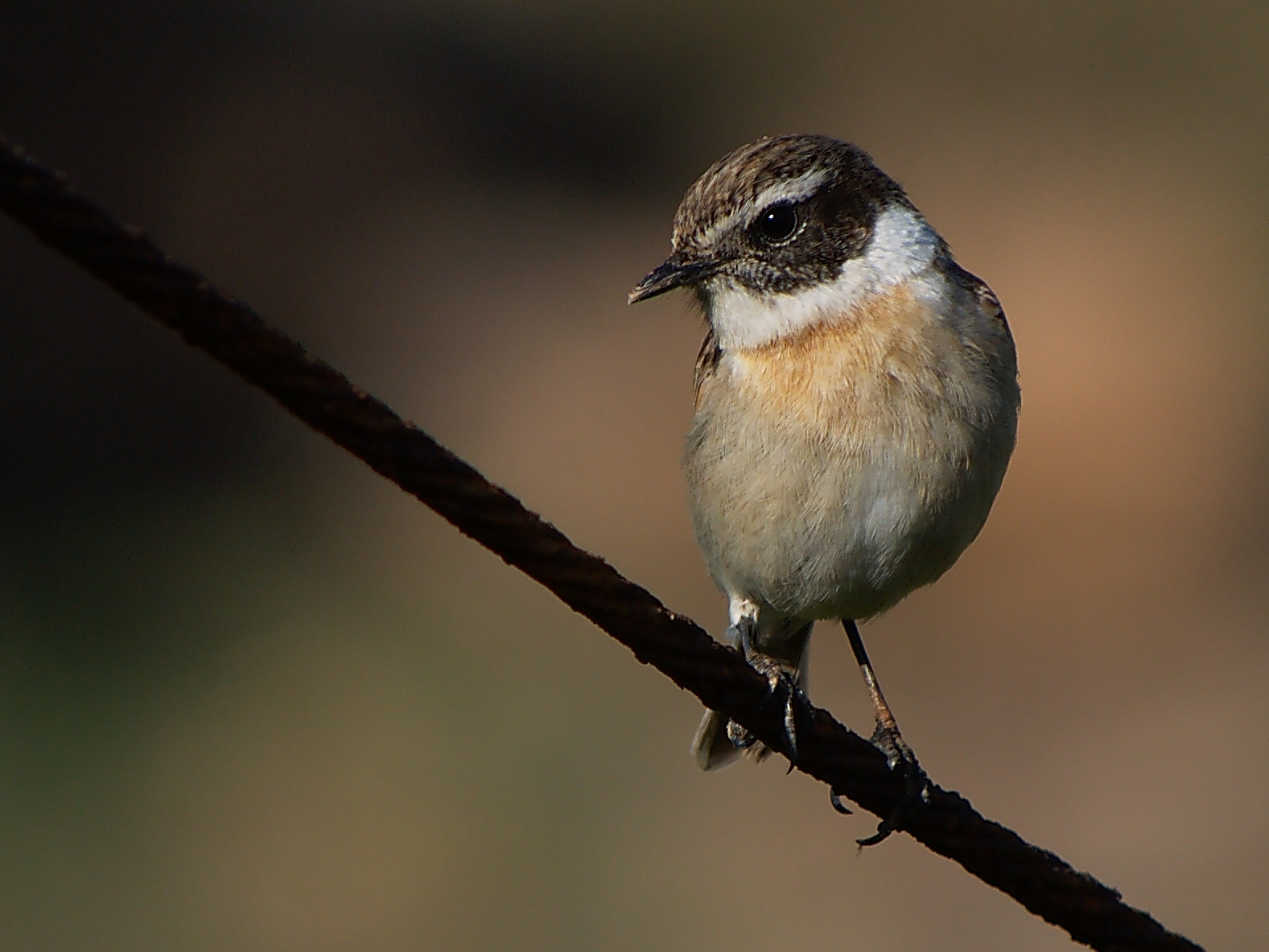
- Male on Fuerteventura, Canary Islands, Spain

Conservation status
- Near Threatened (IUCN 3.1)

Scientific classification
- Kingdom: Animalia
- Phylum: Chordata
- Class: Aves
- Order: Passeriformes
- Family: Muscicapidae
- Genus: Saxicola
- Species: S. dacotiae

Binomial name
- Saxicola dacotiae (Meade-Waldo, 1889)

= Canary Islands stonechat =

Species of bird

The Canary Islands stonechat (Saxicola dacotiae), also known as the Fuerteventura stonechat or Fuerteventura chat, and formerly known as the Canary Islands chat due to its once widespread distribution on the Canary Islands, is a sedentary resident bird found only on the island of Fuerteventura where it is known as the Caldereta.

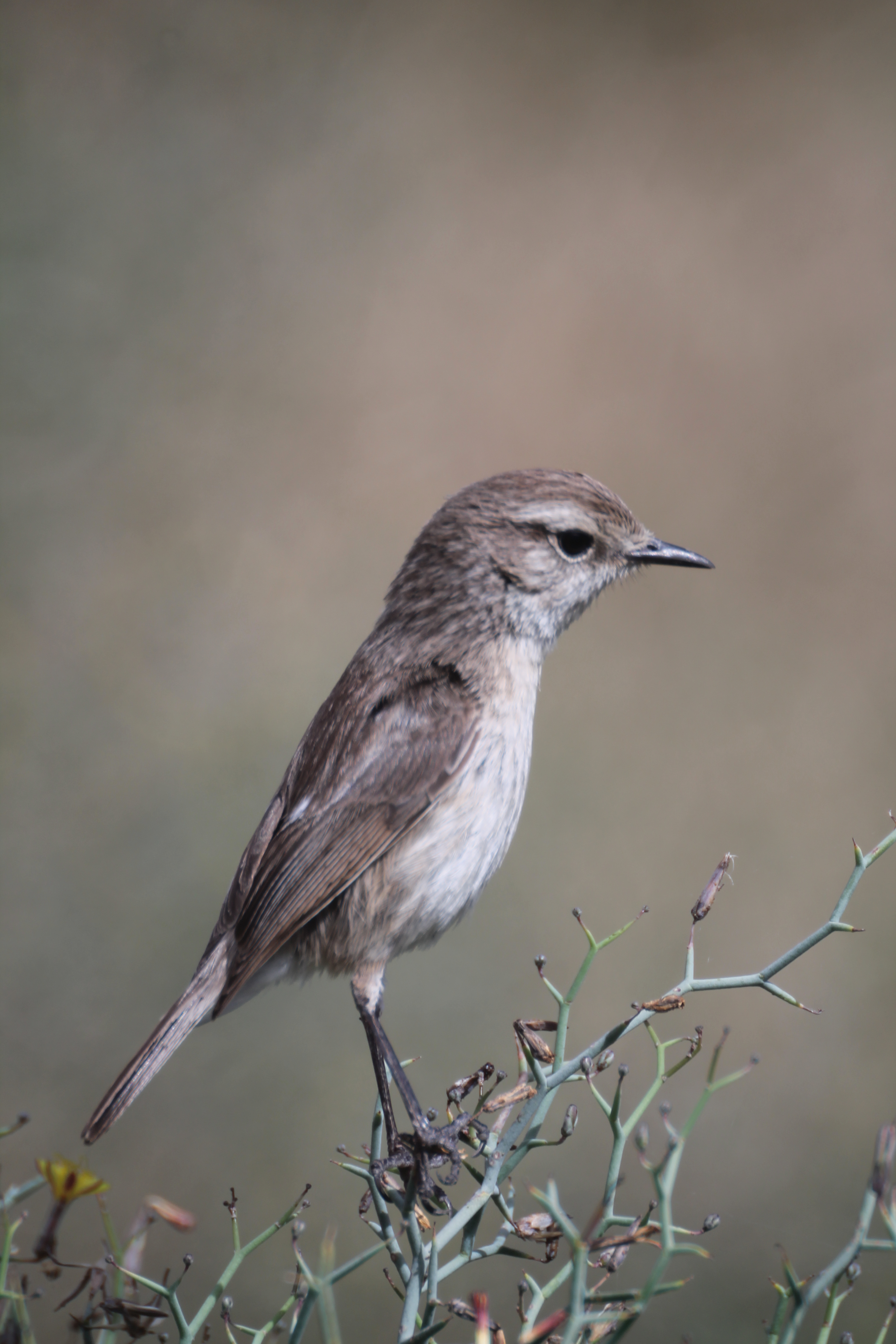
Female Canary Islands stonechat

== Taxonomy ==
The Canary Islands stonechat is a small passerine bird that was classed as a member of the thrush family Turdidae, but is now more generally considered to be an Old World flycatcher in the Muscicapidae. It, and similar small European species, are often called chats. It was included in the "common stonechat" (Saxicola torquata), but it is quite distinct; it is likely to be an insular derivative of ancestral European stonechats that colonised the islands some 1-2 mya, during the Early Pleistocene (Wink et al. 2002).

== Description ==
The Canary Islands stonechat is intermediate in appearance between the European stonechat and the whinchat; its body size and shape reminiscent of a lithe European robin. Its upperparts are generally coloured as the whinchat, but more contrasting, dark brown with a blackish head and back streaks. It has a purer white supercilium reaching behind the eye and white neck sides, and a light orangey-chestnut breast becoming duller and paler on the underside towards the whitish belly. The rump and tail are dark, the latter with a white pattern visible in flight. There is also a white wing band. The female is similar to a washed-out version of the male, with a brown, black-streaked head and no white neck patches.

The male has a ticking call like a pebble hitting another, and a high twittering song like a European stonechat.

== Ecology ==
This Canary Islands stonechat is highly faithful to good habitat. Its main occurrence and only breeding habitat is in barrancos, ravines and rocky slopes with fairly sparse (30-50% open ground), shrubby vegetation (Illera et al., 2006). Although they sometimes also venture into more open and arid areas such as malpaís (old lava flows with resurgent vegetation), the species prefers copses of palm trees and shrubs (Álamo Tavío 1975) such as the aulaga Launaea arborescens, the saltwort Caroxylon vermiculatum and the boxthorn Lycium intricatum (BirdLife International 2004). Males sing from exposed perches, from where the birds also like to hunt insects on the wing; occasionally, they venture into fields or gardens for feeding. Completely open habitat appears only to be utilised when gathering food for their young (BirdLife International 2004).

Laying 4-5 eggs per clutch and incubating for 13 days, it usually manages to raise two clutches of young a year.

== Conservation status ==
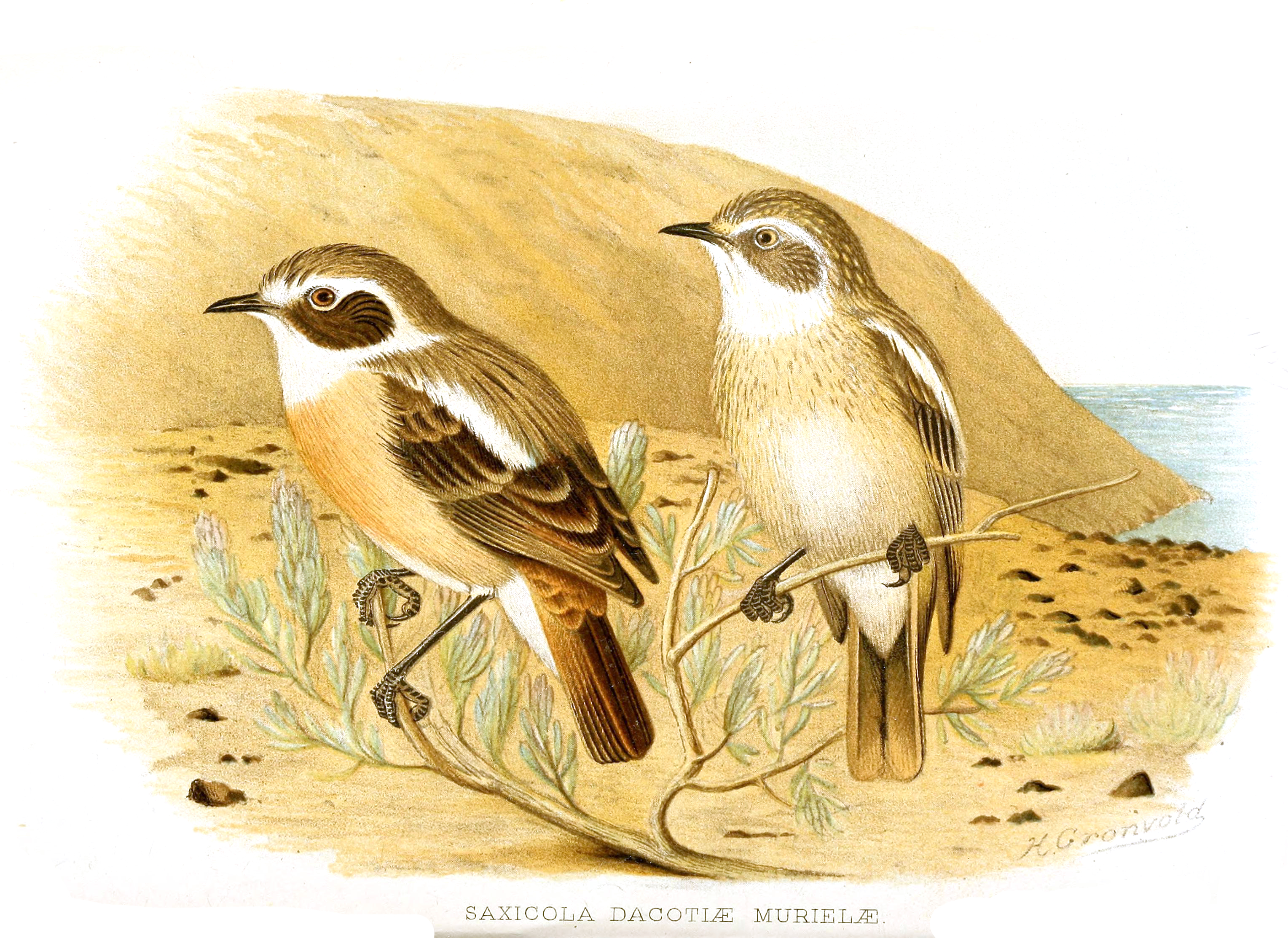
The extinct sub-species

This Canary Islands stonechat is now considered Endangered, as construction, mainly tourism-related, encroaches upon the best habitat (Illera et al., 2006). The population is hard to estimate, but most probably between 1300 and 1700 mature birds (BirdLife International 2004), and recognisably in decline. In particular, heavy land clearance on the Jandía peninsula is isolating the local subpopulation and making it vulnerable to adverse effects of small population size.

Desertification, exacerbated by grazing goats and locally sinking water tables, has also contributed to habitat loss. Feral cats and black rats prey on the eggs and young. A conservation action plan has existed for this species since 1999 (BirdLife International 2004). Due to its fairly high reproductive rate, if enough habitat is secured and predators are kept at bay, it should be able to hold its own.

The Chinijo chat, subspecies murielae from the Chinijo Archipelago near Lanzarote, became extinct in the early 20th century. Usually claimed as mainly due to deteriorating habitat quality, the extinction may be more due to the effect of introduced predators. It was only reported to inhabit two offshore islands (Montaña Clara and Alegranza).
