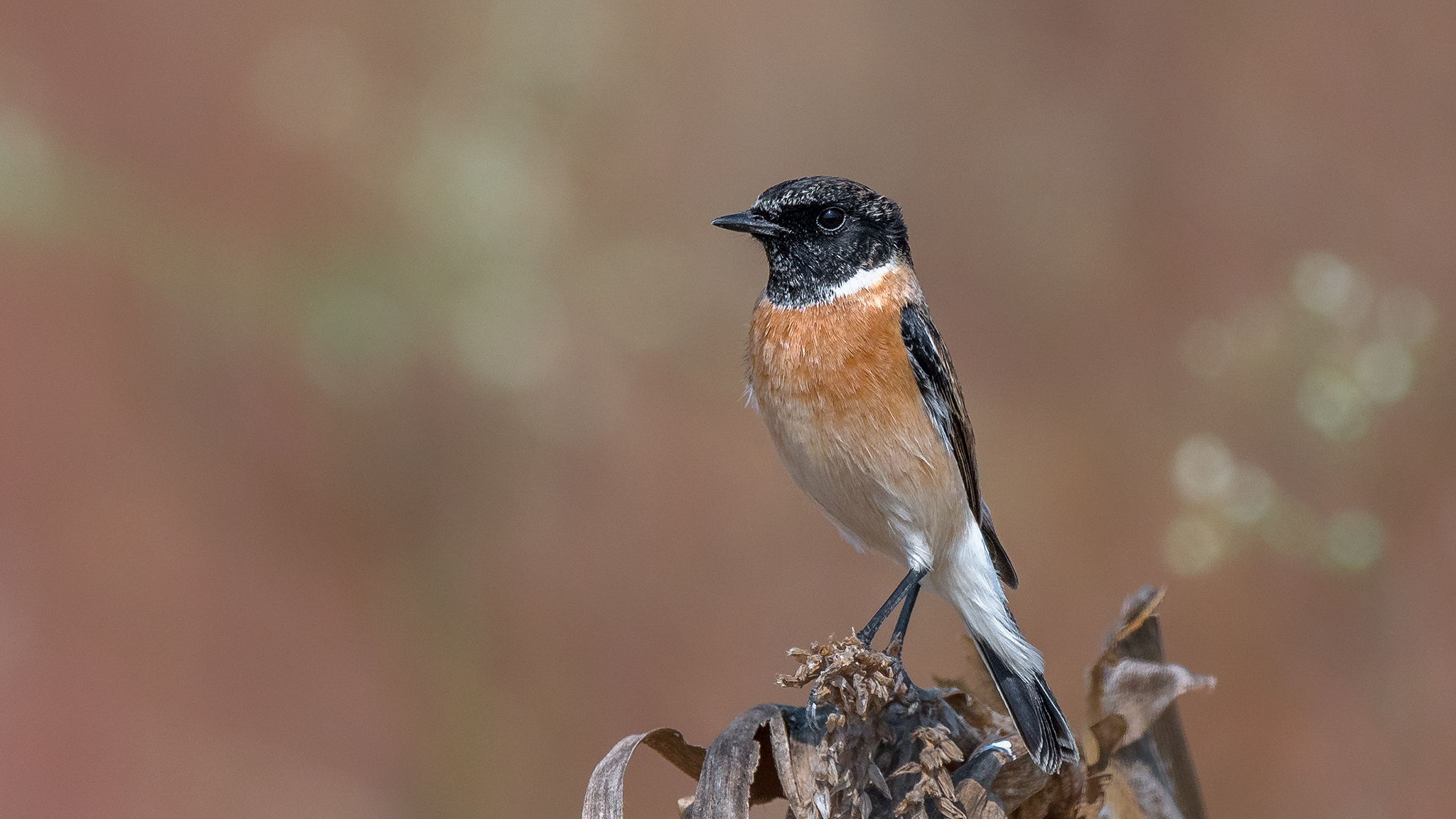
- Male in breeding plumage Andhra Pradesh, India
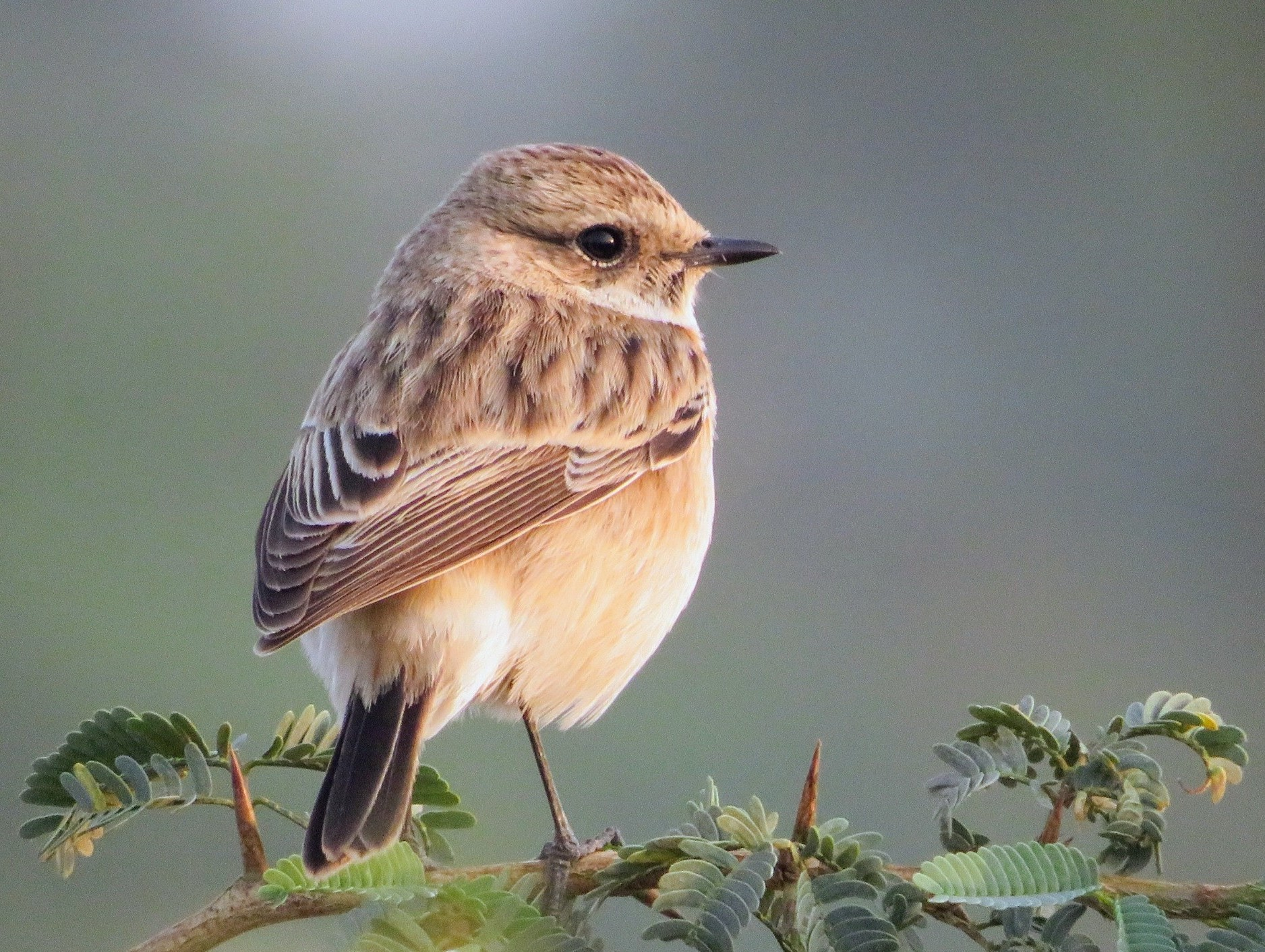
- Female wintering in Jamnagar, Gujarat

Scientific classification
- Kingdom: Animalia
- Phylum: Chordata
- Class: Aves
- Order: Passeriformes
- Family: Muscicapidae
- Genus: Saxicola
- Species: S. maurus

Binomial name
- Saxicola maurus (Pallas, 1773)

Synonyms
- Saxicola maura (lapsus); Saxicola torquata maura (lapsus); Saxicola torquatus maurus (Pallas, 1773); Saxicola torquata przewalskii

= Siberian stonechat =

November 2023

The Siberian stonechat or Asian stonechat (Saxicola maurus) is a recently validated species of the Old World flycatcher family (Muscicapidae). Like the other thrush-like flycatchers, it was often placed in the Turdidae in the past. It breeds in the East Palearctic including in easternmost Europe and winters in the Old World tropics.

== Taxonomy ==
The Siberian stonechat was formally described in 1773 as Muscicapa maura by the German naturalist Peter Simon Pallas based on a specimen collected at Karassum near the Ishim River in western Siberia. The specific epithet is from Latin maura meaning "African" or "Moorish" (i.e. "black" or "dark"). The Siberian stonechat is now placed in the genus Saxicola that was introduced in 1802 by the German naturalist Johann Matthäus Bechstein. The genus name combines the Latin saxum, saxi meaning "stone" with -cola meaning "dweller" from colere meaning "to inhabit".

Six subspecies are recognised:

- S. m. hemprichii Ehrenberg, CG, 1833 – steppes of lower Volga and mouth of Ural River to eastern Caucasus
- S. m. variegatus (Gmelin, SG, 1774) – mountains of eastern Turkey to Transcaucasia and Iran
- S. m. maurus (Pallas, PS, 1773) – breeds eastern Russia to central Asia; winters to Iran, Iraq, and northern India
- S. m. indicus (Blyth, E, 1847) – breeds Himalayas (Kashmir to Sikkim and Assam); winters to India
- S. m. przewalskii (Pleske, TE, 1889) – breeds mountains of western China; winters to Myanmar and northern India
- S. m. stejnegeri (Parrot, CPA, 1908) – breeds eastern Siberia to Japan and Korea; winters to southern China and Indochina
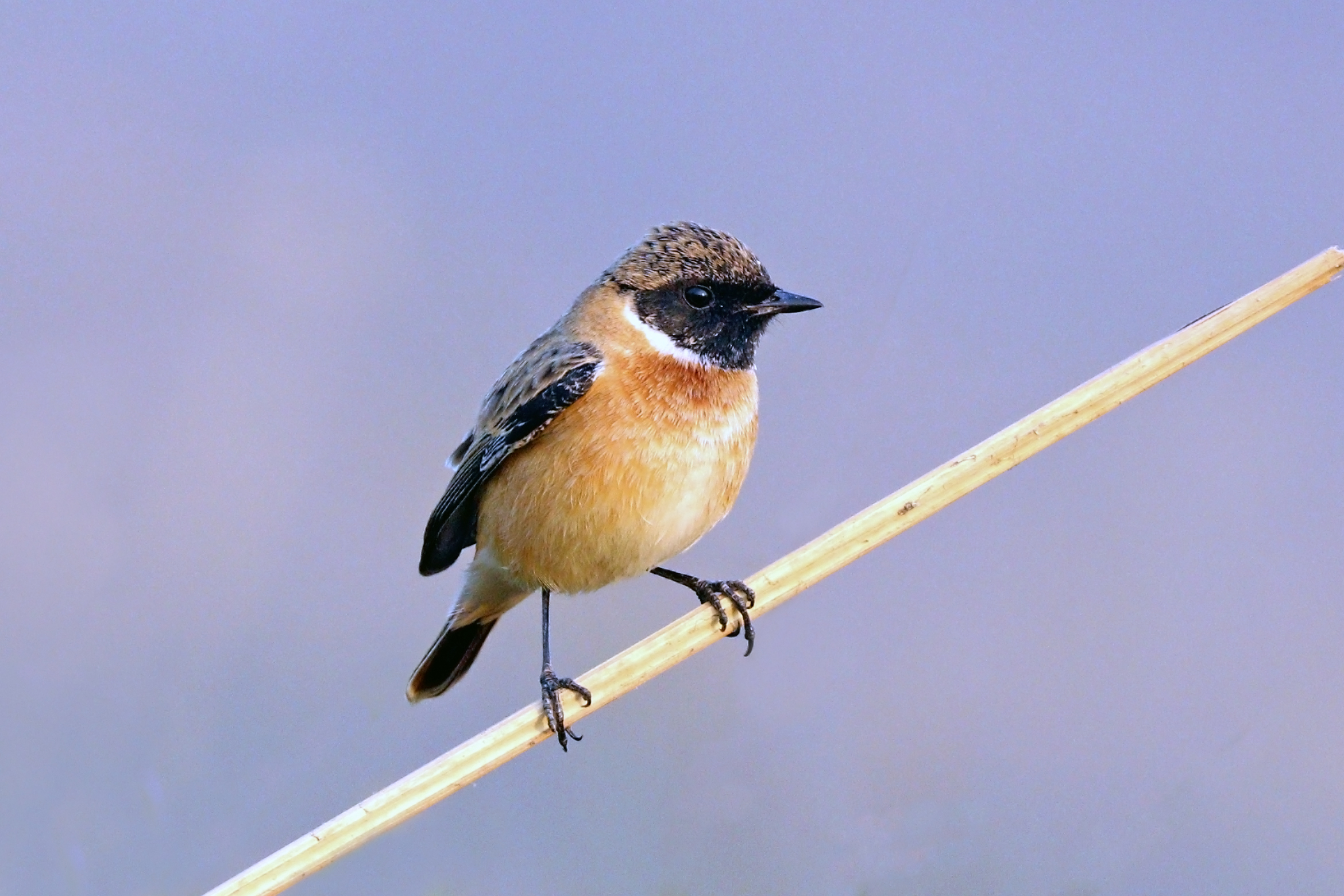
Male non-breeding, Uttar Pradesh, India

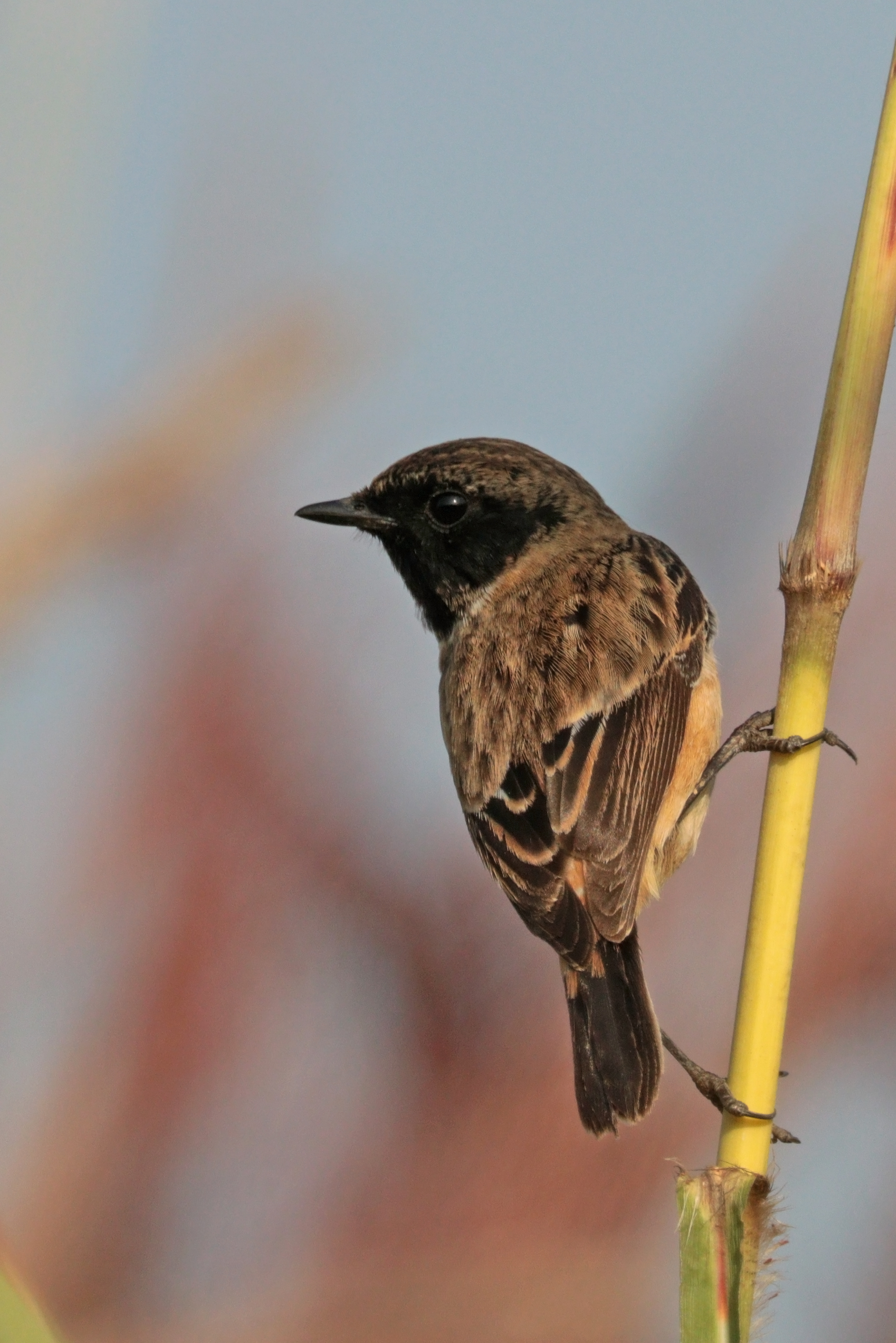
Male S. m. indicus, Bardiya National Park, Nepal

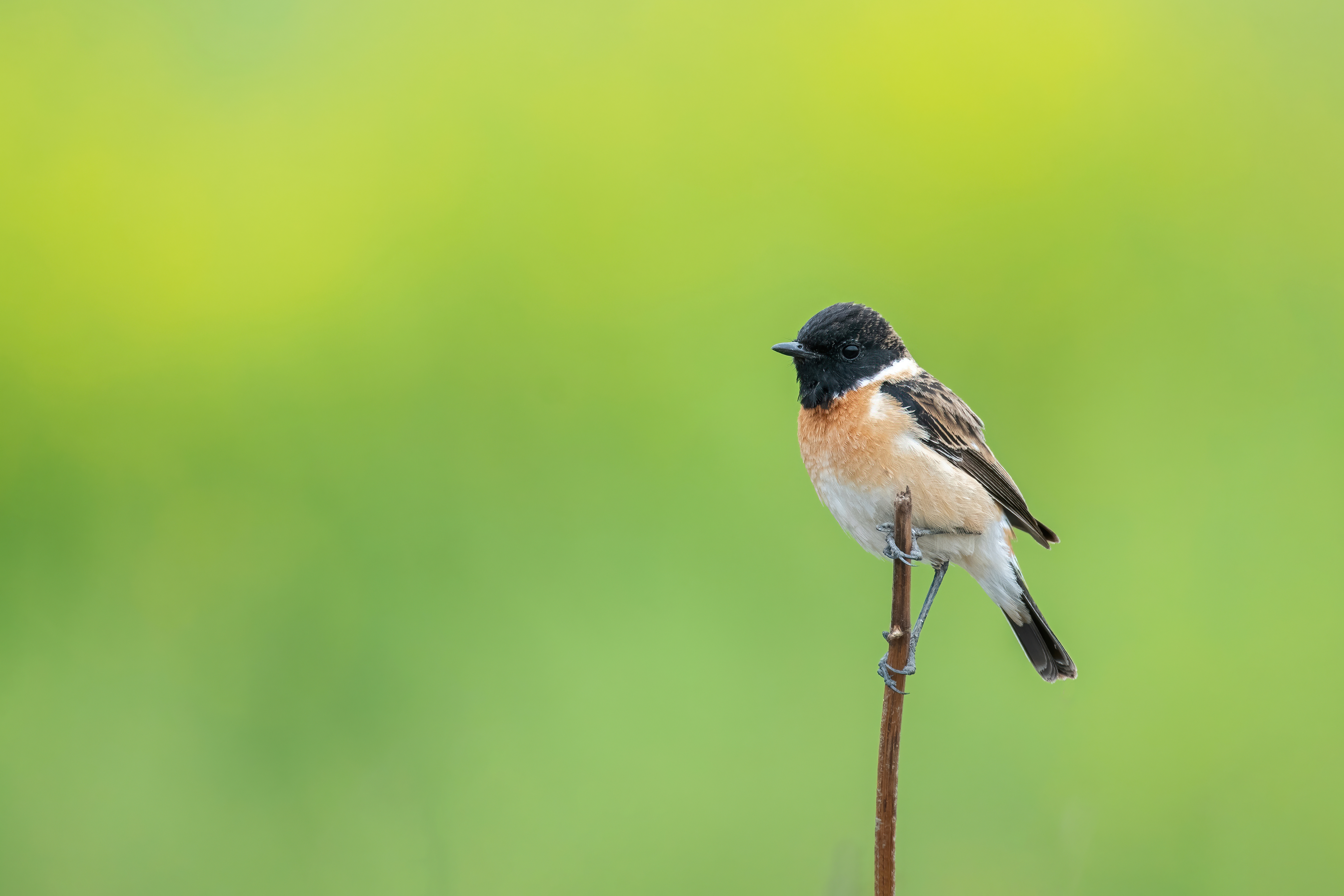
male S. m. indicus
Bhaktapur, Nepal

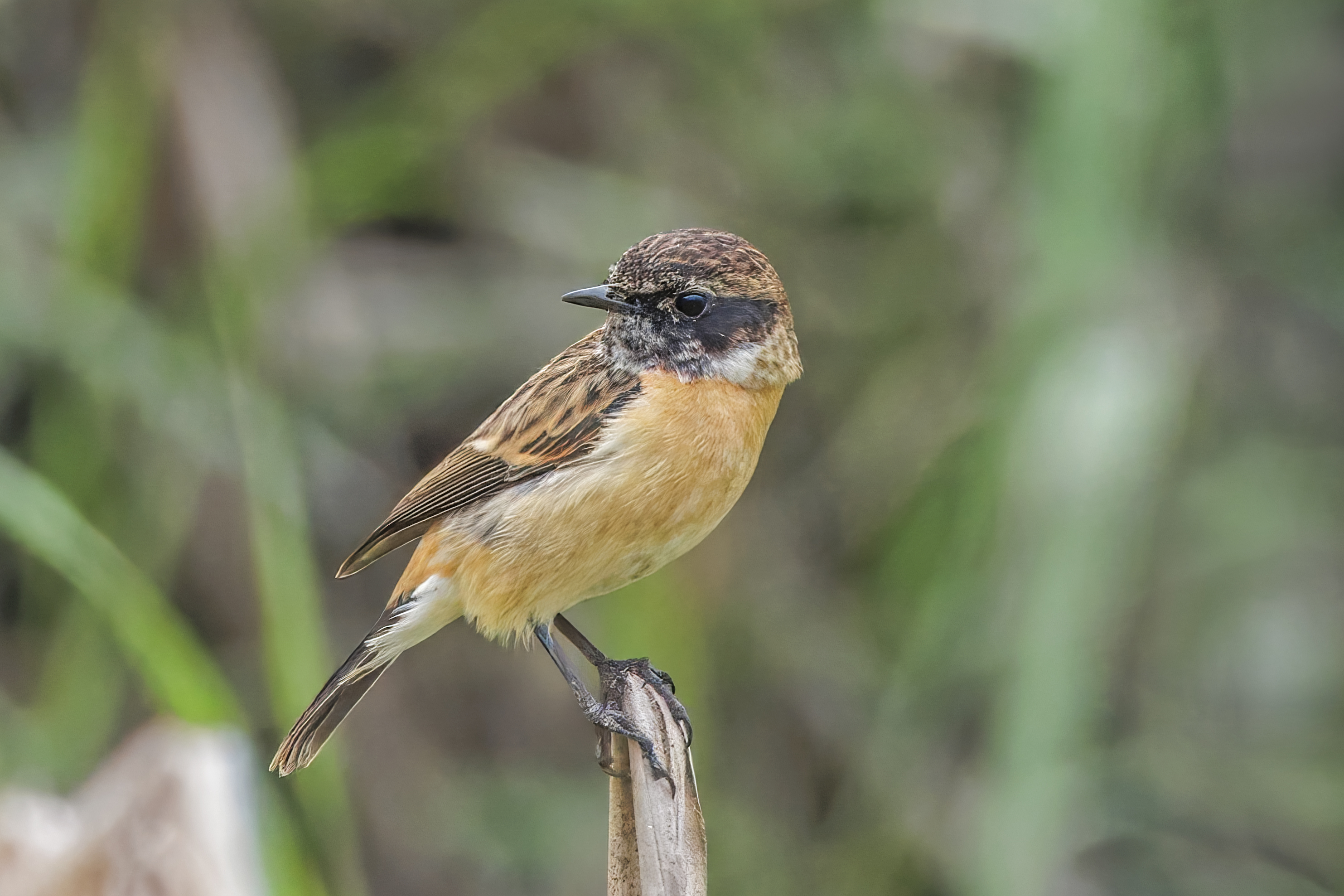
male S. m. przewalskii
non-breeding, Vietnam

The subspecies S. m. stejnegeri has sometimes been considered as a separate species, the Amur stonechat, based on molecular genetic studies.

== Description ==
Siberian stonechat resembles its close relative relative the European stonechat (S. rubicola), but is typically darker above and paler below, with a white rump and whiter underparts with less orange on the breast. The male in breeding plumage has black upperparts and head (lacking the brownish tones of the European stonechat), a conspicuous white collar, scapular patch and rump, and a restricted area of orange on the throat.

The female has pale brown upperparts and head, white neck patches (not a full collar), and a pale, unstreaked pinkish-yellow rump. Males in winter plumage are intermediate between summer males and females, with a supercilium resembling the whinchat (S. rubetra); from this species and the female it can be distinguished by the full white collar.

If seen at close distance, it can be recognized that its primary remiges are distinctly longer than in S. rubicola. In this, it closely resembles the whinchat, which like S. maurus is adapted to long-distance migrations.

The male has a clicking call, like two pebbles knocked together. The song is high and twittering like the dunnock (Prunella modularis), an unrelated passeridan songbird belonging to the Passeroidea.

There are five or six subspecies, with S. m. maurus (described above) and the distinct but similar S. m. stejnegeri found across northern and central Asia. The southern S. m. variegatus (west of the Caspian Sea), S. m. armenicus (eastern Turkey to Iran), S. m. indicus (Himalaya) and the Turkestan stonechat S. m. przewalskii (southwest China) are distinguished by larger white areas on the plumage.

In the past, S. maurus was usually included in S. torquatus as part of the "common stonechat", but that scientific name nowadays is restricted to the African stonechat. Analysis of mtDNA cytochrome b sequence and nDNA microsatellite fingerprinting data, though not unequivocal, together with the evidence from morphology, behaviour and biogeography seems to indicate that the present bird can be considered a distinct species. The European stonechat is its western sister species in the Eurasian lineage of stonechats; their ancestors separated during the Late Pliocene or Early Pleistocene, roughly 1.5-2.5 million years ago at the onset of the Quaternary glaciation.

== Distribution and habitat ==
The breeding range covers most of temperate Asia, from about latitude 71°N in Siberia south to the Himalaya and southwest China, and west to eastern Turkey and the Caspian Sea area. It also breeds in the far northeast of Europe, mainly in Russia but occasionally as far west as Finland.

The wintering range of the migratory bird is from southern Japan south to Thailand and India, and west to northeast Africa. On migration, small numbers reach as far west as western Europe, and exceptionally as far east as Alaska in North America.

== Behaviour ==
The Siberian stonechat is insectivorous. It breeds in open rough scrubland or rough grassland with scattered shrubs, from sea level to about 4,000 m ASL or more. The birds seem to avoid even cool temperate conditions and stay up north only during the hot continental summer. In the montane regions of the Himalaya foothills of Bhutan, migrants can on occasion be seen foraging in fields and pastures more than 2,000 m ASL, but most move further down and south to winter in tropical regions.

Though it is not considered a distinct species by the IUCN, it is widespread and common and would not be considered a threatened species.

== Sources ==
- Bangs, Outram (1932): Birds of western China obtained by the Kelley-Roosevelts expedition. Field Mus. Nat. Hist. Zool. Ser. 18(11): 343–379. Fulltext at the Internet Archive
- BirdLife International (2020). "Saxicola torquatus". IUCN Red List of Threatened Species. 2020 e.T22710184A181614254. doi:10.2305/IUCN.UK.2020-3.RLTS.T22710184A181614254.en.
- Inskipp, Carol; Inskipp, Tim & Sherub (2000):"The ornithological importance of Thrumshingla National Park, Bhutan". Forktail 14: 147–162.
- Robertson, Iain (1977): Identification and European status of eastern Stonechats Brit. Birds 70: 237–245.
- Stoddart, Andy (1992): Identification of Siberian Stonechat Birding World 5(9): 348–356.
- Urquhart, Ewan & Bowley, Adam (2002): Stonechats. A Guide to the Genus Saxicola. Christopher Helm, London. ISBN 0-7136-6024-4
- Wink, M.; Sauer-Gürth, H. & Gwinner, E. (2002): Evolutionary relationships of stonechats and related species inferred from mitochondrial-DNA sequences and genomic fingerprinting. British Birds 95: 349–355. PDF fulltext
- Wittmann, U.; Heidrich, P.; Wink, M. & Gwinner, E. (1995): Speciation in the Stonechat (Saxicola torquata) inferred from nucleotide sequences of the cytochrome b-gene. Journal of Zoological Systematics and Evolutionary Research 33(2): 116–122. doi:10.1111/j.1439-0469.1995.tb00218.x HTML abstract
