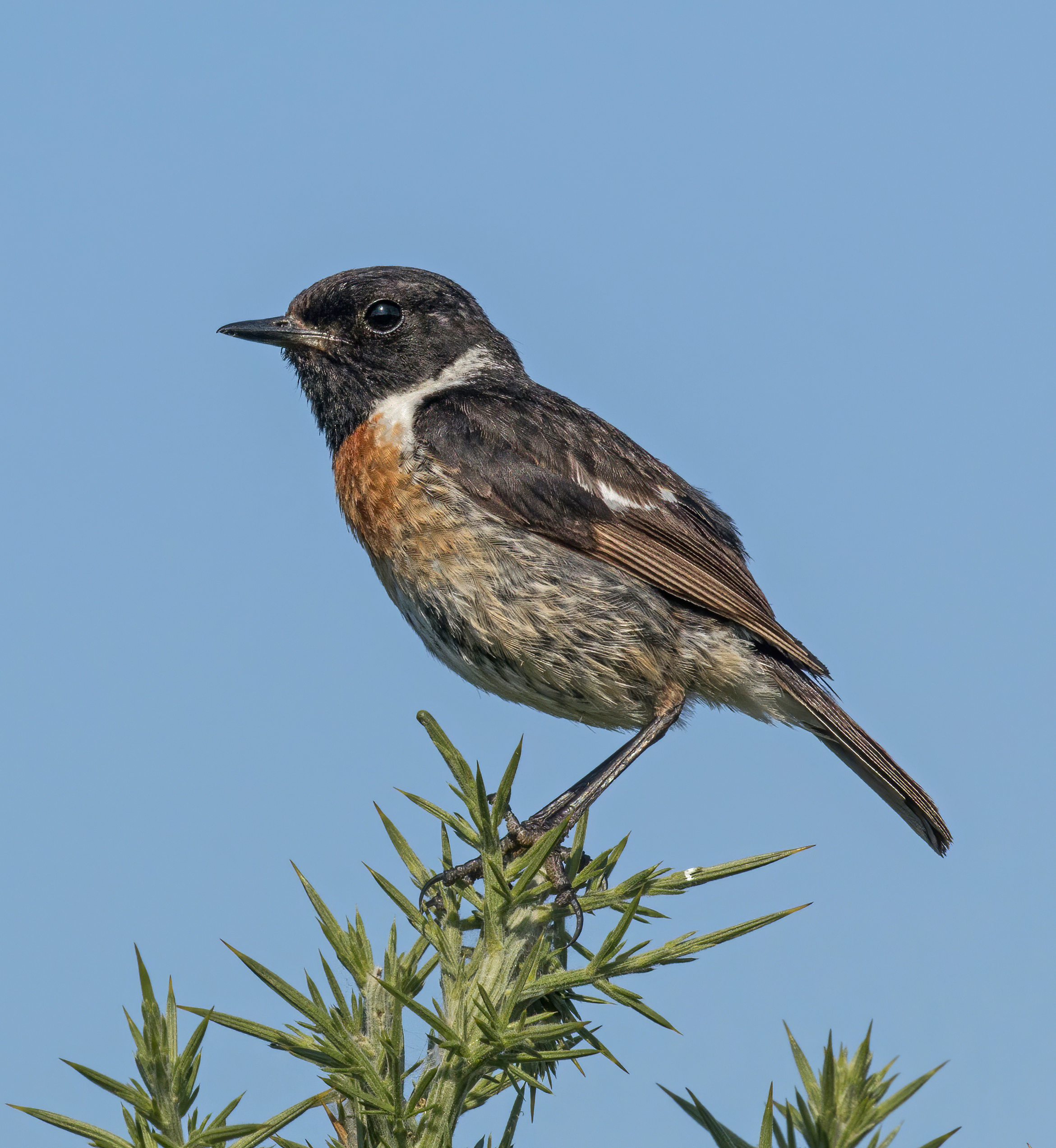
- Male S. r. hibernans Hampshire, UK
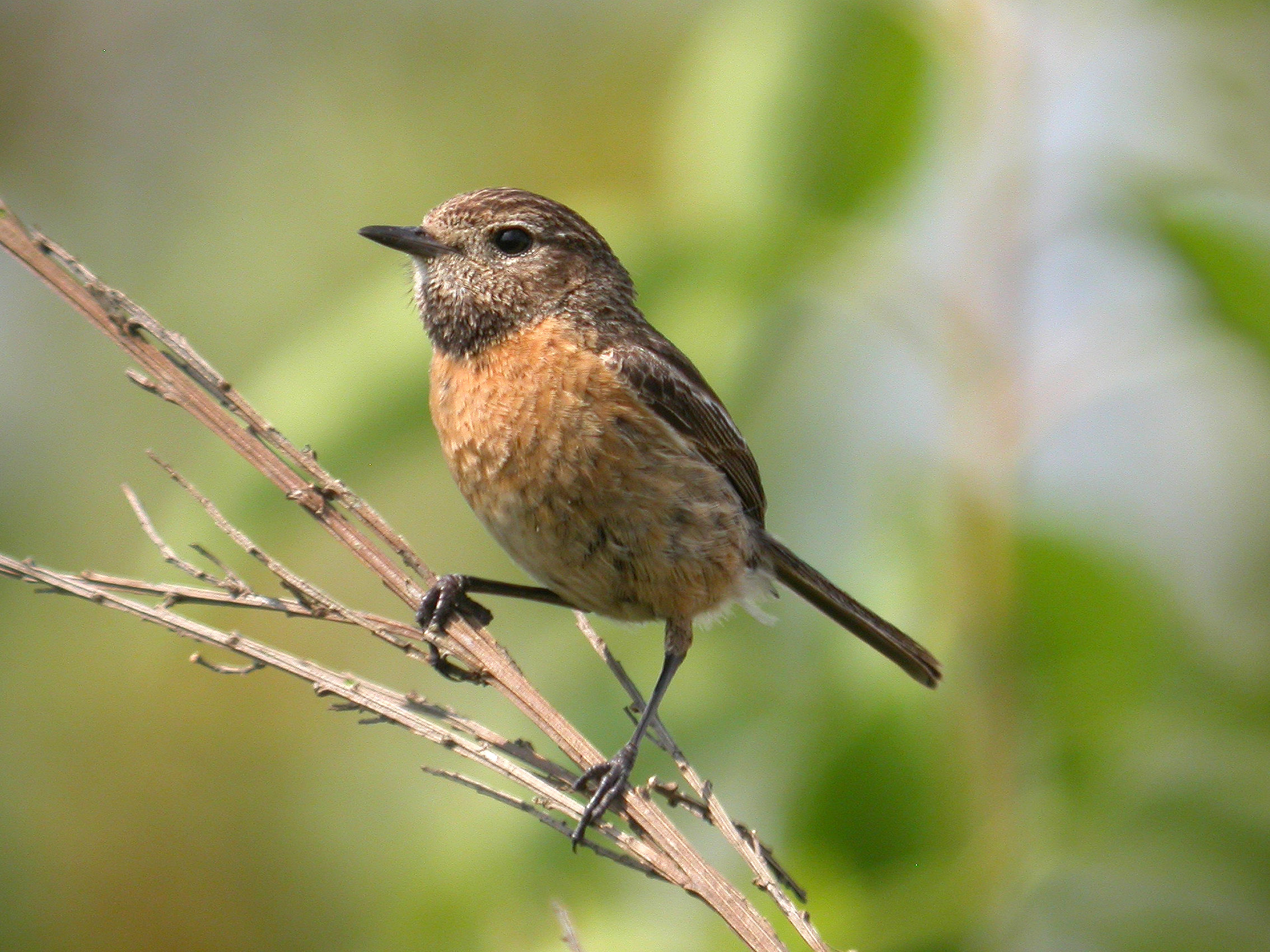
- Female S. r. rubicola Belgium Recorded in Surrey

Scientific classification
- Kingdom: Animalia
- Phylum: Chordata
- Class: Aves
- Order: Passeriformes
- Family: Muscicapidae
- Genus: Saxicola
- Species: S. rubicola

Binomial name
- Saxicola rubicola (Linnaeus, 1766)

Synonyms
- Motacilla rubicola Linnaeus, 1766; Saxicola torquatus rubicola (Linnaeus, 1766); Pratincola rubicola (Linnaeus)

= European stonechat =

Species of bird

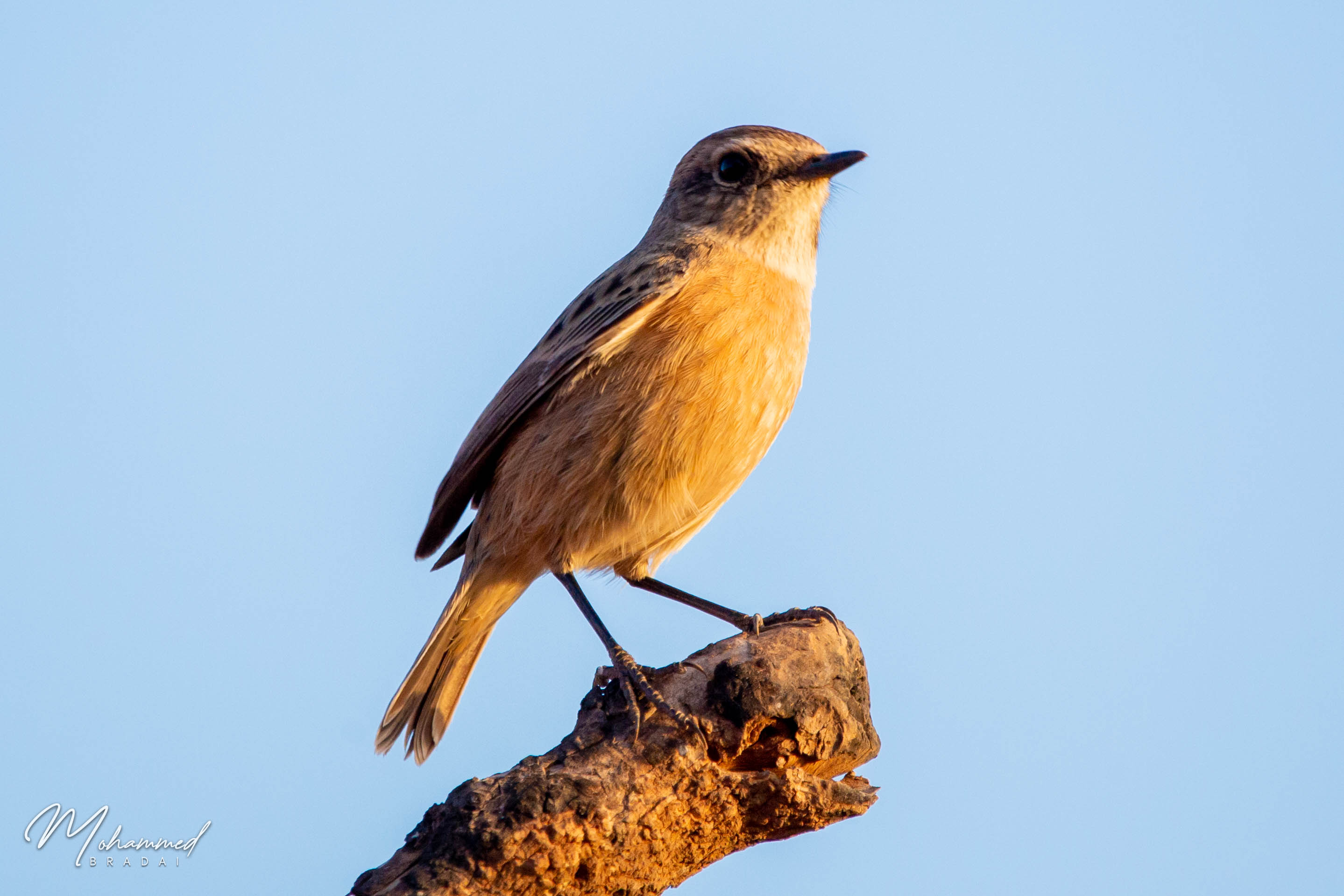
Juvenile female European stonechat (Saxicola rubicola) in Boutlélis, Oran, Algeria. November 2025.

The European stonechat (Saxicola rubicola) is a small passerine bird that was formerly classed as a subspecies of the common stonechat. Long considered a member of the thrush family, Turdidae, genetic evidence has placed it and its relatives in the Old World flycatcher family, Muscicapidae. It is found across Europe, as far east as Ukraine and the South Caucasus, and in parts of North Africa.

== Taxonomy and systematics ==
The European stonechat was formally described by the Swedish naturalist Carl Linnaeus in 1766 in the twelfth edition of his Systema Naturae under the binomial name Motacilla rubicola. This species is now placed in the genus Saxicola that was introduced by the German naturalist Johann Matthäus Bechstein in 1802. The English name derives from its call, sounding like two stones knocked together. The scientific name Saxicola means "rock-dweller", from Latin saxum meaning "a rock" and incola meaning "dwelling in". The specific epithet combines the Latin rubus meaning "brambles" with incola. The subspecies name hibernans refers to Ireland (Latin, Hibernia).

In the past, the European stonechat was generally considered conspecific with the Siberian stonechat and African stonechat, lumped together as common stonechat S. torquatus. A 2002 study using mtDNA cytochrome b sequences and nuclear DNA microsatellite fingerprinting evidence strongly supported their separation into distinct species. Due to a misunderstanding of the rules of Zoological nomenclature, for a short time the name S. torquatus was erroneously used for the European stonechat rather than the African stonechat.

Together with the Siberian stonechat and Canary Islands stonechat, the European stonechat constitutes eastern and western representatives of a Eurasian lineage; the Asian and European populations separated during the Late Pliocene or Early Pleistocene, roughly 1.5–2.5 mya, and Fuerteventura was colonised by western European or northwest African birds somewhat later in the Early Pleistocene, about 1–2 mya.

=== Subspecies ===
Two weakly defined subspecies are currently recognised:

- S. r. hibernans (Hartert, E, 1910) – Northwestern Europe in Atlantic coastal areas, in southwestern Norway, Great Britain, Ireland and northwestern France. Birds in coastal Portugal are also often listed as this subspecies, but this is disputed.
- S. r. rubicola (Linnaeus, 1766) – In the south and east of its range, from Denmark southwest to Spain and Morocco, east to Poland and Ukraine, and southeast to Turkey. Winters in North Africa and the Middle East.

== Description ==
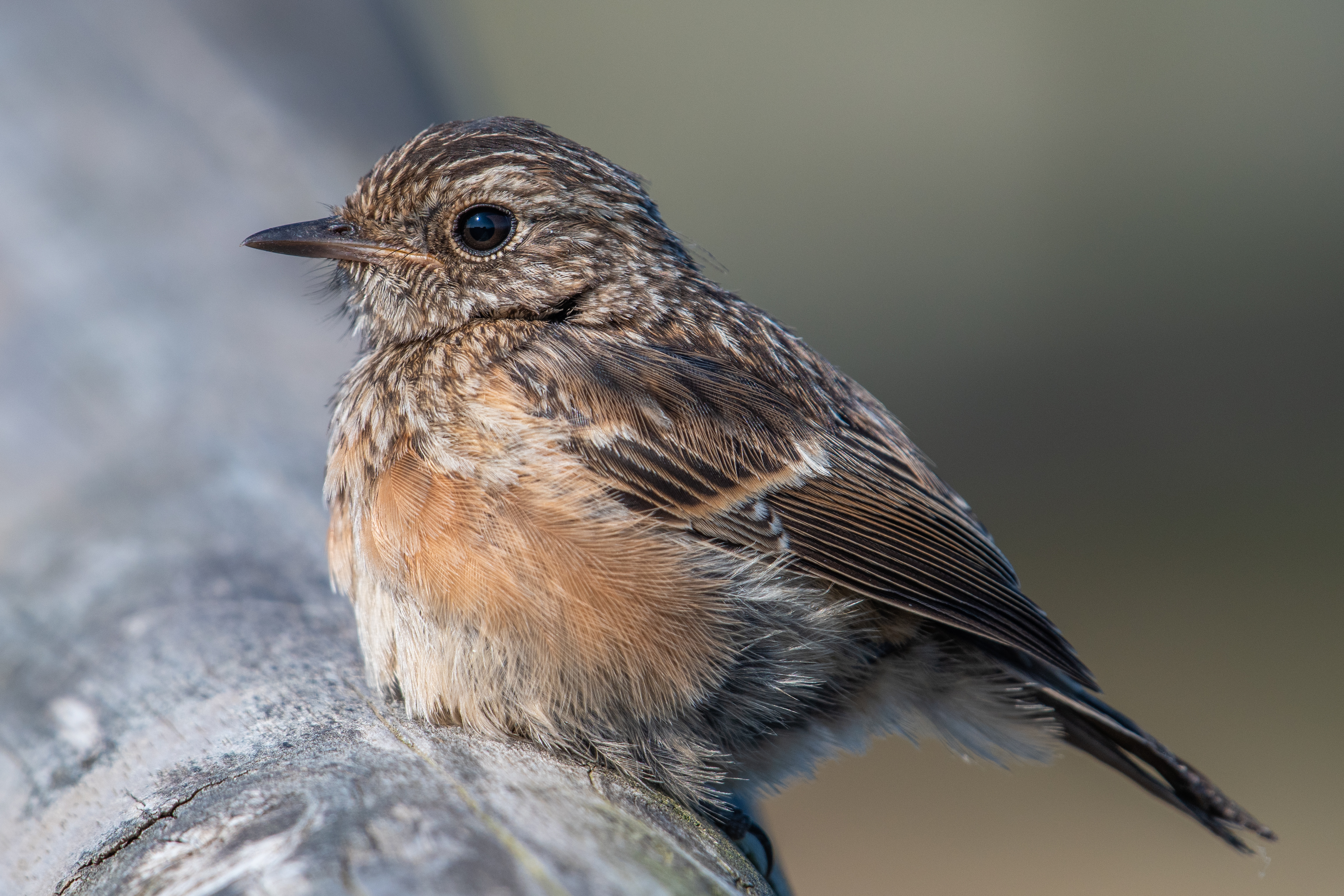
Juvenile in Spain

The stonechat is 11.5–13 cm (4.5–5.1 in) long and weighs 13–17 g (0.46–0.60 oz), slightly smaller than the European robin. Both sexes have distinctively short wings, shorter than those of the more migratory whinchat and Siberian stonechat. The summer male has black upperparts, a black head, an orange throat and breast, and a white belly and vent. It also has a white half-collar on the sides of its neck, a small white scapular patch on the wings, and a very small white patch on the rump often streaked with black. The female has brown upperparts and head, and no white neck patches, rump or belly, these areas being streaked dark brown on paler brown, the only white being the scapular patch on the wings and even this often being buffy-white.

The two subspecies differ in colour intensity following Gloger's rule, with S. r. rubicola paler and with larger white patches in the drier European continental and mediterranean climates, and S. r. hibernans darker brown with less white in the humid Atlantic oceanic climate. They intergrade broadly where their ranges meet, from southeastern England south through France and Spain, and many individuals are not identifiable to subspecies. Extreme examples of S. r. rubicola from the driest southern areas of its range such as the Algarve and Sicily are particularly pale and with a large white rump, and can be very similar to Siberian stonechats in appearance. nDNA microsatellite fingerprinting reveals a very small degree of separation between the two subspecies.

A study of the size of the white wing patch and its components of variation in a Spanish population of S. r. rubicola found it to be a dynamic trait that changes throughout individuals' lives, but also a consistent trait at the individual level. The white wing patch could convey information about the long-term quality and current state of individuals.

The male's song is high and twittering like a dunnock. Both sexes have a clicking call like stones knocking together.

== Distribution and habitat ==
European stonechats breed in heathland, coastal dunes and rough grassland with scattered small shrubs and bramble, open gorse, tussocks or heather. They are short-distance migrants or non-migratory, with part of the population (particularly from northeastern parts of the range, where winters are colder) moving south to winter further south in Europe and more widely in north Africa. Their range has grown northward in recent decades: in Poland, in the mid-20th century they inhabited only the southern part of the country (in the spring and summer) but by the early 2000s had expanded across the country up to the Baltic coast.

== Behaviour and ecology ==
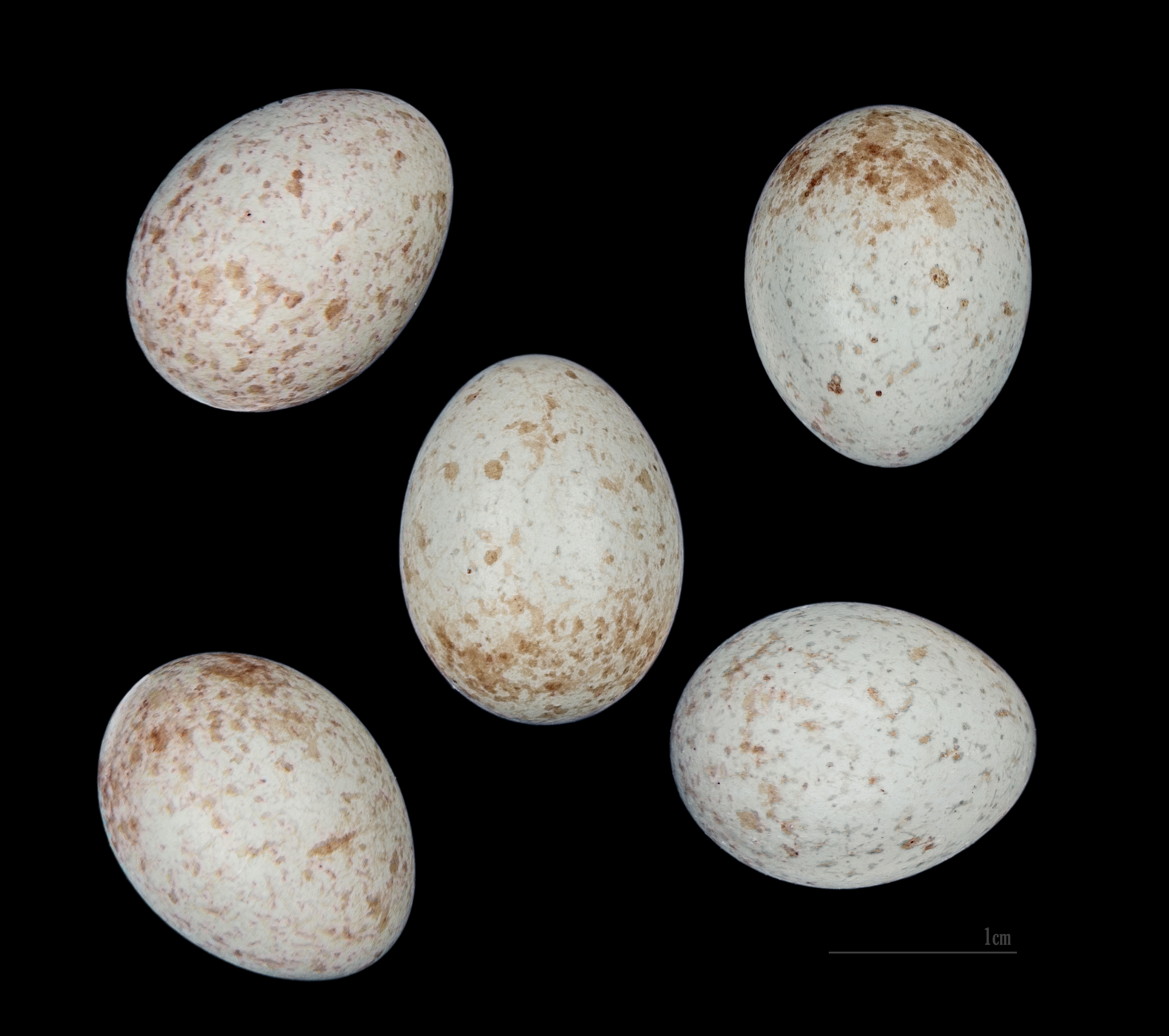
Eggs

=== Breeding ===
European stonechats first breed when they are one year old. They are monogamous during the breeding season but do not pair for life. The nest is built entirely by the female and is placed in dense vegetation close to the ground. It is a loose unwoven cup of dried grass lined with hair and feathers. The eggs are laid in early morning at daily intervals. The clutch is typically 4–6 eggs, which are pale blue to greenish-blue with red-brown freckles that are more numerous at the larger end. The average size of an egg is 18.7 mm × 14.4 mm (0.74 in × 0.57 in) with a weight of 2.0 g (0.071 oz). They are incubated for 13–14 days by the female beginning after the last egg is laid. Both parents care for and feed the chicks. They are brooded by the female. The nestlings fledge 12–16 days after hatching but continue to be fed by both parents for a further 4–5 days after which the female begins building a new nest for another brood while the male continues to feed the young for another 5–10 days. The parents raise two or three broods in a season.
