= Capped seedeater =

The capped seedeater has been split into two distinct species, and may refer to:

- Copper seedeater, Sporophila bouvreuil
- Pearly-bellied seedeater, Sporophila pileata
