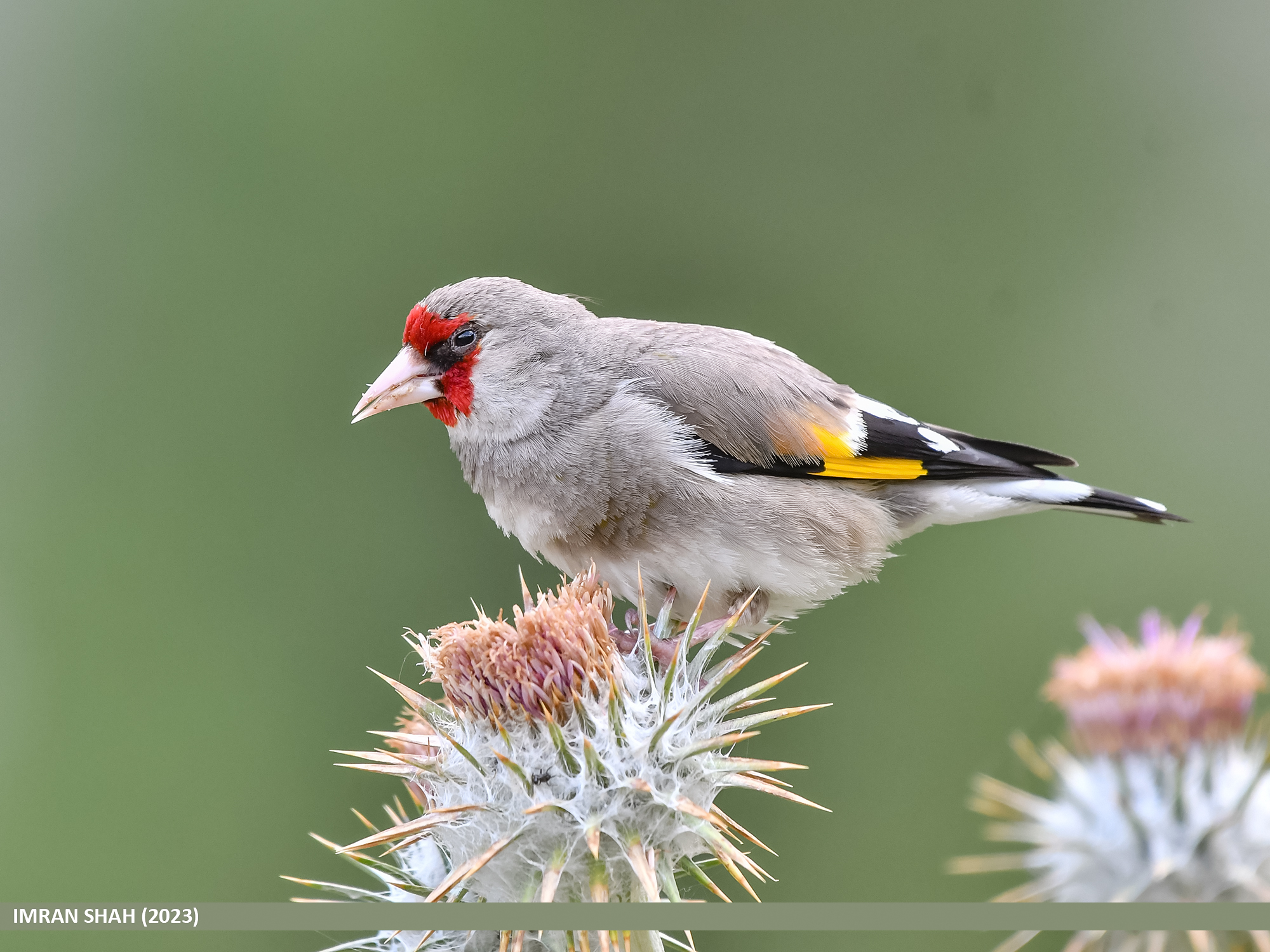
- ssp. caniceps in Gilgit

Conservation status
- Least Concern (IUCN 3.1)

Scientific classification
- Kingdom: Animalia
- Phylum: Chordata
- Class: Aves
- Order: Passeriformes
- Family: Fringillidae
- Subfamily: Carduelinae
- Genus: Carduelis
- Species: C. caniceps

Binomial name
- Carduelis caniceps Vigors, 1831
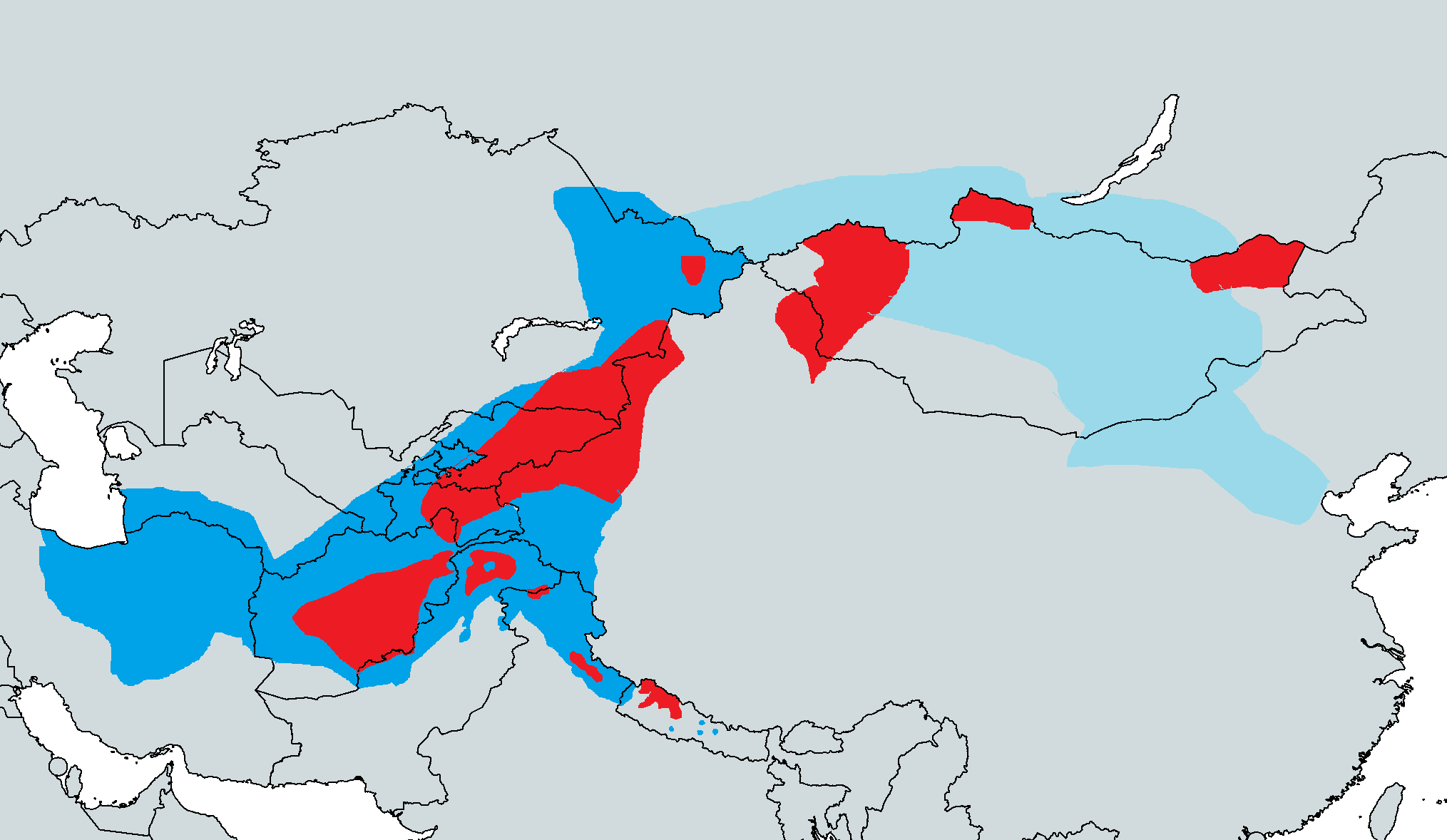
- Breeding Non-breeding Vagrant

Synonyms
- Carduelis carduelis caniceps For the subspecies -: paropanisi - Carduelis caniceps subcaniceps; subulata - Fringilla subulata, Passer carduelis var. jenisensis, Fringilla orientalis, Cardueis caniceps poliakovi

= Grey-crowned goldfinch =

Species of bird

The grey-crowned goldfinch (Carduelis caniceps), also known as the eastern goldfinch, Himalayan goldfinch or the grey-capped goldfinch, is a small passerine bird in the family Fringillidae that is distributed throughout Central Asia and the Himalayas.

== Etymology ==
The genus name Carduelis comes from Linnaeus's specific epithet for the European Goldfinch Fringilla carduelis. Carduelis is the Latin name for the goldfinch.

The epithet caniceps is derived from the Latin canus (grey) and caput (head).

== Phylogeny ==
The phylogenetic relationships among the Carduelis species are shown below, based on the data by the Cornell Lab of Ornithology.

- Carduelis
  - - Grey-crowned goldfinch, C. caniceps
    - European goldfinch, C. carduelis
  - - Citril finch, C. citrinella
    - Corsican finch, C. corsicana

The grey-crowned goldfinch separated from the European goldfinch about 1.5 million years ago, in the Quaternary period.

== Taxonomy ==
Although first described by Vigors as a distinct species, the grey-crowned goldfinch was until recently widely treated as a subspecies group in the European goldfinch, primarily because it hybridised with it in southwestern Siberia and northern Iran. In 2016, BirdLife International restored its species status, and in 2024, the IOC World Bird List followed suit, accepting it as a separate species because of its very distinct plumage, lacking the black crown and vertical line behind the ear coverts of its relative.

=== Subspecies ===
Four subspecies are currently accepted:

- Carduelis caniceps paropanisi Kollibay, 1910 (Western Turkmenistan and eastern Iran to northwest China) - paler face than C. c. caniceps and breast is almost entirely grey
- Carduelis caniceps subulata Gloger, 1833 (Northeast Kazakhstan, Siberia and Mongolia) - largest subspecies, upperparts pale buffish grey or tinged with cinnamon
- Carduelis caniceps caniceps Vigors, 1831 (Western and northern Pakistan and northwestern Himalayas east to central Nepal) - smaller and darker grey than C. c. subulata
- Carduelis caniceps ultima Koelz, 1949 - southern Iran (often considered to be conspecific with C. c. paropanisi) - longer billed than C. c. paropanisi

== Description ==
The grey-crowned goldfinch is 10.5–14 cm (4.1–5.5 in) long with a wingspan of 21.5–25.5 cm (8.5–10.0 in). They weigh about 15–21 g (0.53–0.74 oz).

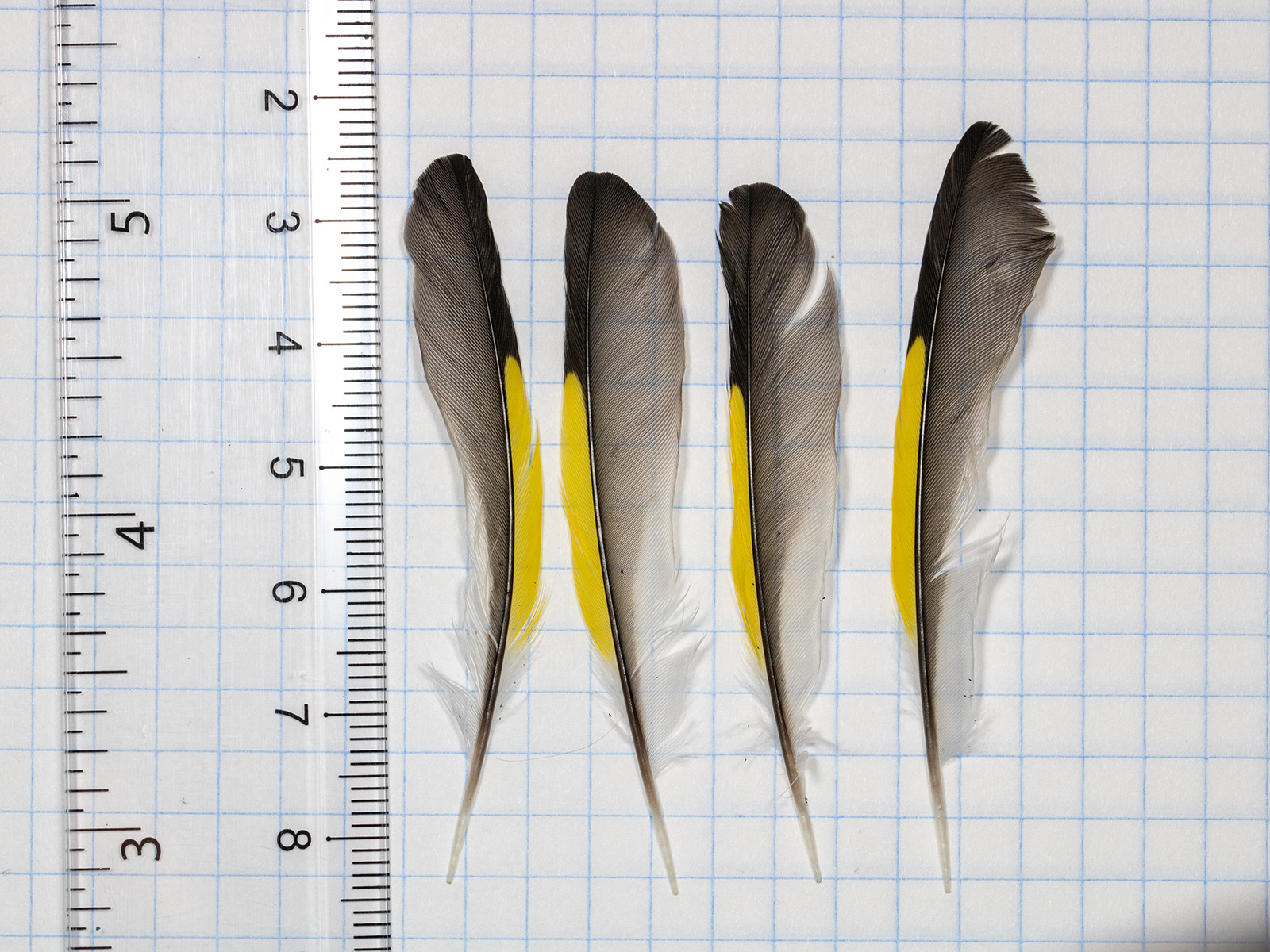
Feathers

The male has a brighter and more extensive red on the face and brighter yellow on the wing than the female, which appears to be the only notable difference between the sexes. Both sexes have a pinkish bill.

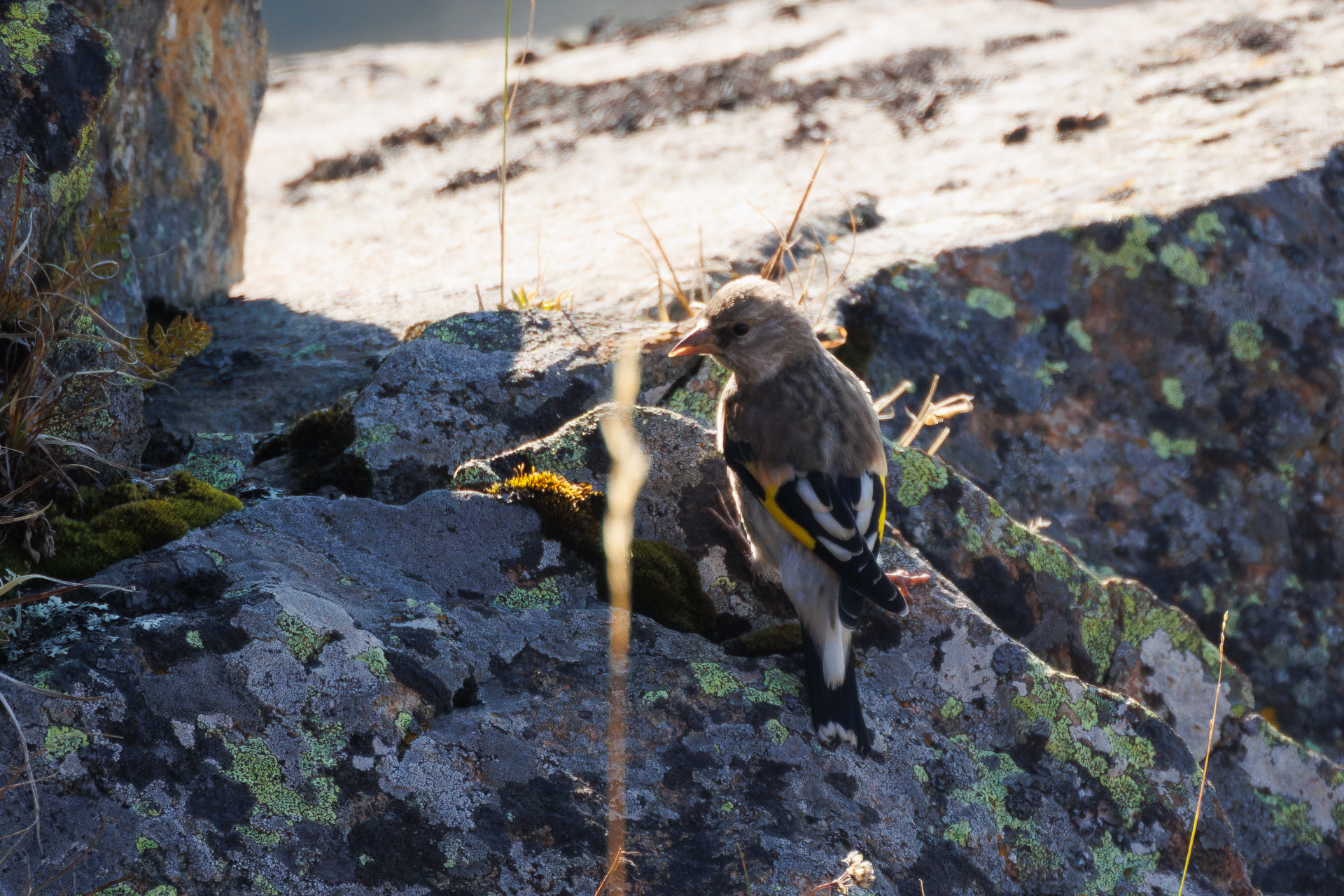
Juvenile in Russia

The juvenile lacks the red in the face, has faint streaking on breast and has buffish tips to coverts and tertial markings. The juvenile has duller and darker legs compared to the adult's pink to dull brown legs.

== Vocalizations ==
The song of the grey-crowned goldfinch is a rather chaffinch-like combination, with a long mix of pleasant bubbling and twittering, though it lacks the "tinkling" notes of the European goldfinch. Its calls include twittering "deedelit" and "chirik", which do have a similar tinkling sound.

== Distribution ==
The grey-crowned goldfinch breeds in southern and eastern Iran east through Afghanistan to the western Himalaya in northern and western Pakistan, northwestern India, and western Nepal, and northeast through Central Asia to the far west of Xinjiang in China. In the nonbreeding season it is found to lower levels in the Himalaya and Central Asia; in the Himalaya, it is a altitudinal migrant, breeding at 2,400–4,200 m altitude (rarely down to 1,500 m), and descending in winter to 1,900–2,400 m (rarely down to 75 m) altitude; similar altitudinal migration also occurs in Kazakhstan.

It occupies open and sparse deciduous woodland, mixed deciduous and conifer woods, forest edges at an altitude of 2100-3600 m, orchards and often parks and gardens. It usually lives at altitudes higher than the European goldfinch.

=== Vagrancy ===
The species has been recorded as a vagrant in Beijing, China. A vagrant, possibly C.carduelis subulata, was recorded in Japan.

Escaped or released captive birds have been reported in North America, but much more rarely than European goldfinch, with fewer than 1% of the number of that species.

== Behaviour and ecology ==
=== Flocks ===
They gather in flocks of four to several dozen birds and sometimes with other finches. They usually forage on the ground. They form flocks during autumn and winter to forage for food.

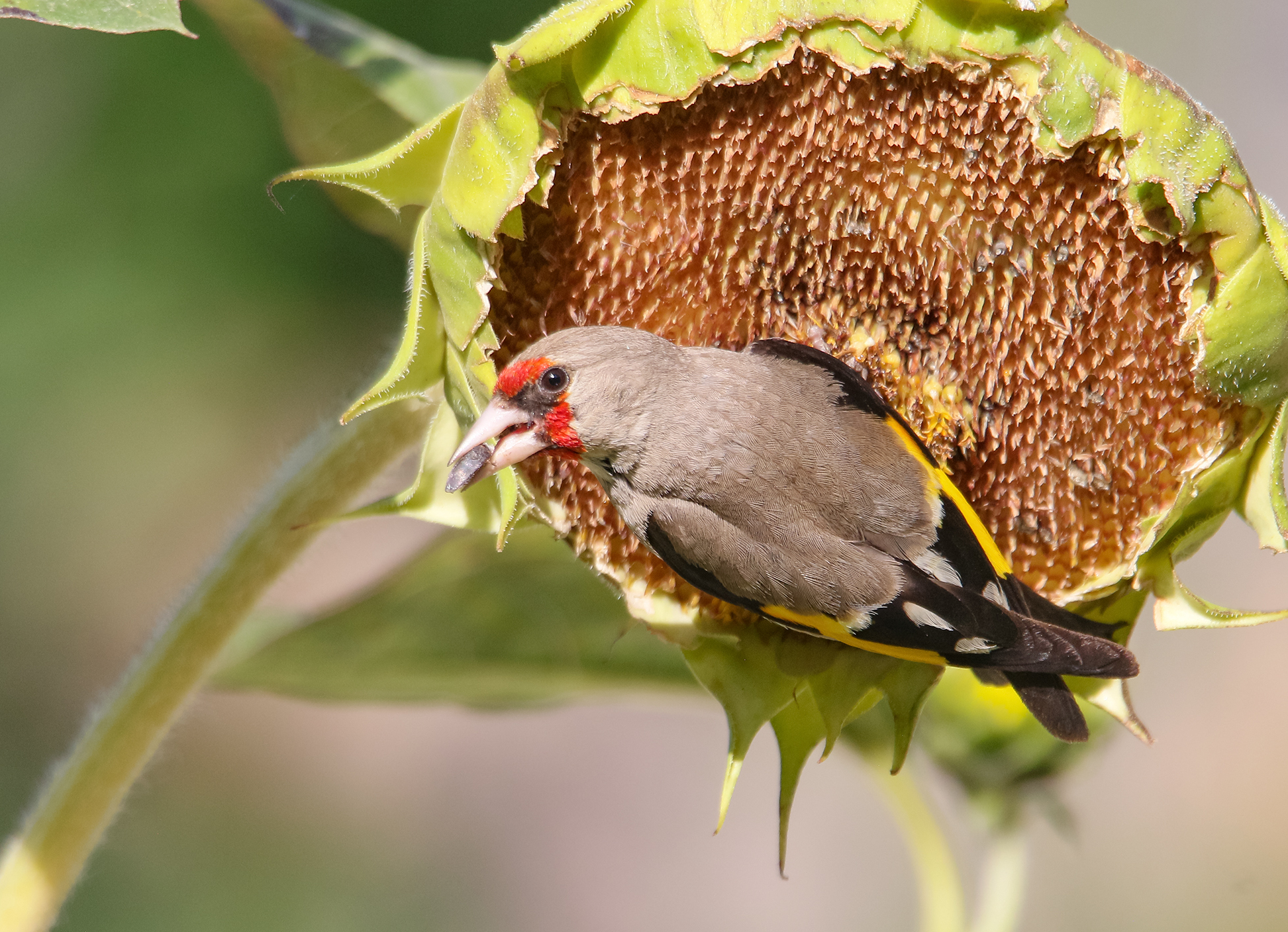
Feeding on sunflower seeds

=== Diet ===
Feeding

The diet consists mainly of seeds of various flowers, such as thistles, sunflowers, zinnia, chinar and dandelions. They are also known to eat arthropods.

=== Breeding ===
Their breeding season occurs from April to August. They nest in groups with up to five nests in one tree.

The birds have their first brood in May usually in pine trees between 1700 and 2100 meters. After this first brood, they travel higher to 3000-3300 meters in July and they nest in pines, willows, fruit trees in orchards and birches.

Nests, which are constructed by the female (although the male might assist in collection of material) are neatly constructed with mosses and grasses in the shape of a cup. Nests are located as high as 18m or higher. It lays 4 to 5 bluish-white eggs speckled with red and brown. The eggs, which are similar to those of European goldfinch, are about 1.8 cm × 1.3 cm (0.71 in × 0.51 in). Cooperative breeding is not known in this species.

The eggs are incubated by the female for 9-12 days; the chicks stay in the nest for 13-18 days after hatching, and are fed by the parents for up to 10 days after leaving the nest.

=== Hybridization ===
The grey-crowned goldfinch has been known to hybridize with C.carduelis frigoris (with C.caniceps subulata in Siberia) and with C.carduelis brevirostris (with C.caniceps paropanisi, in Iran).

== Gallery ==
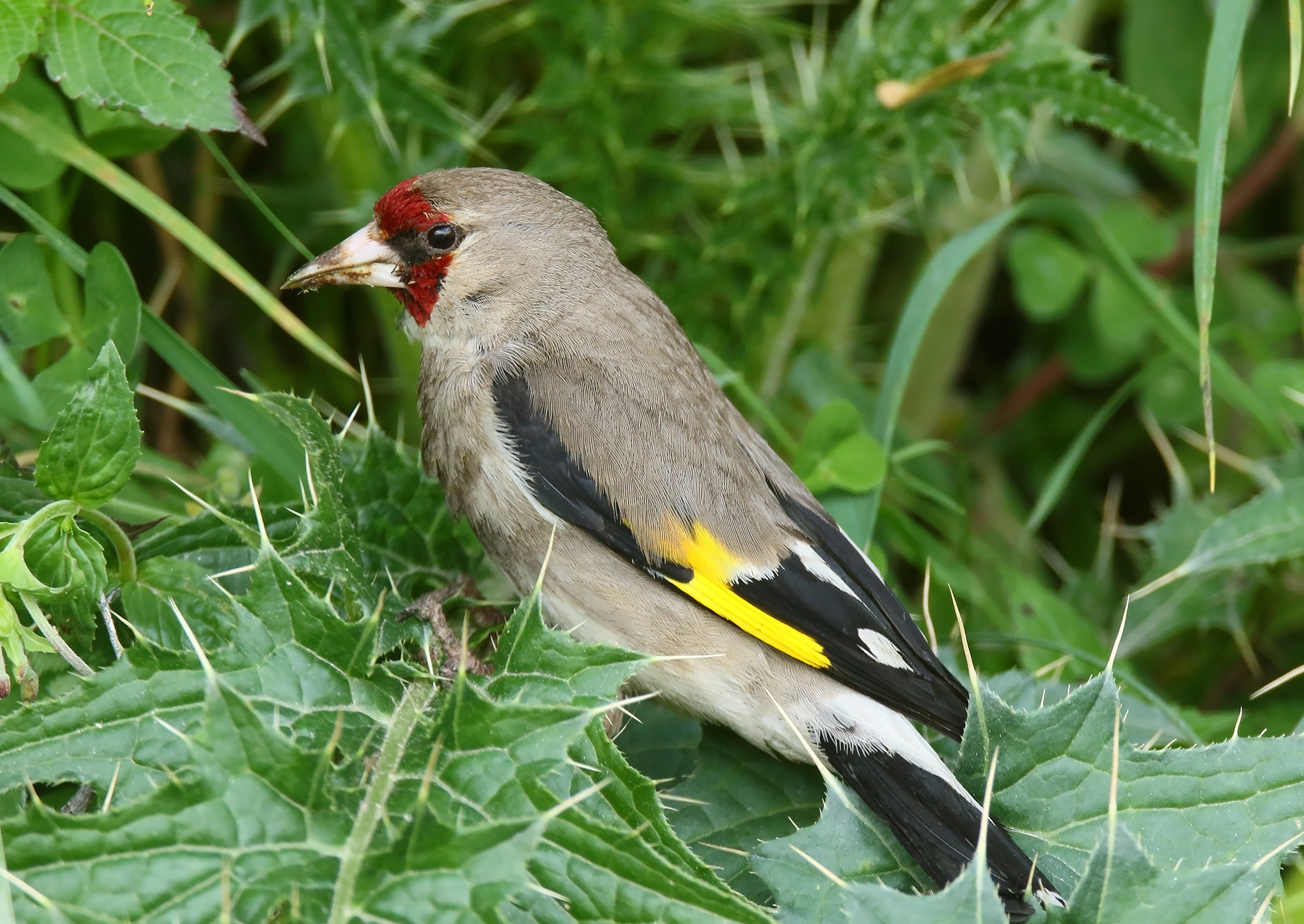
subspecies C. c. caniceps in Gilgit-Baltistan, Pakistan

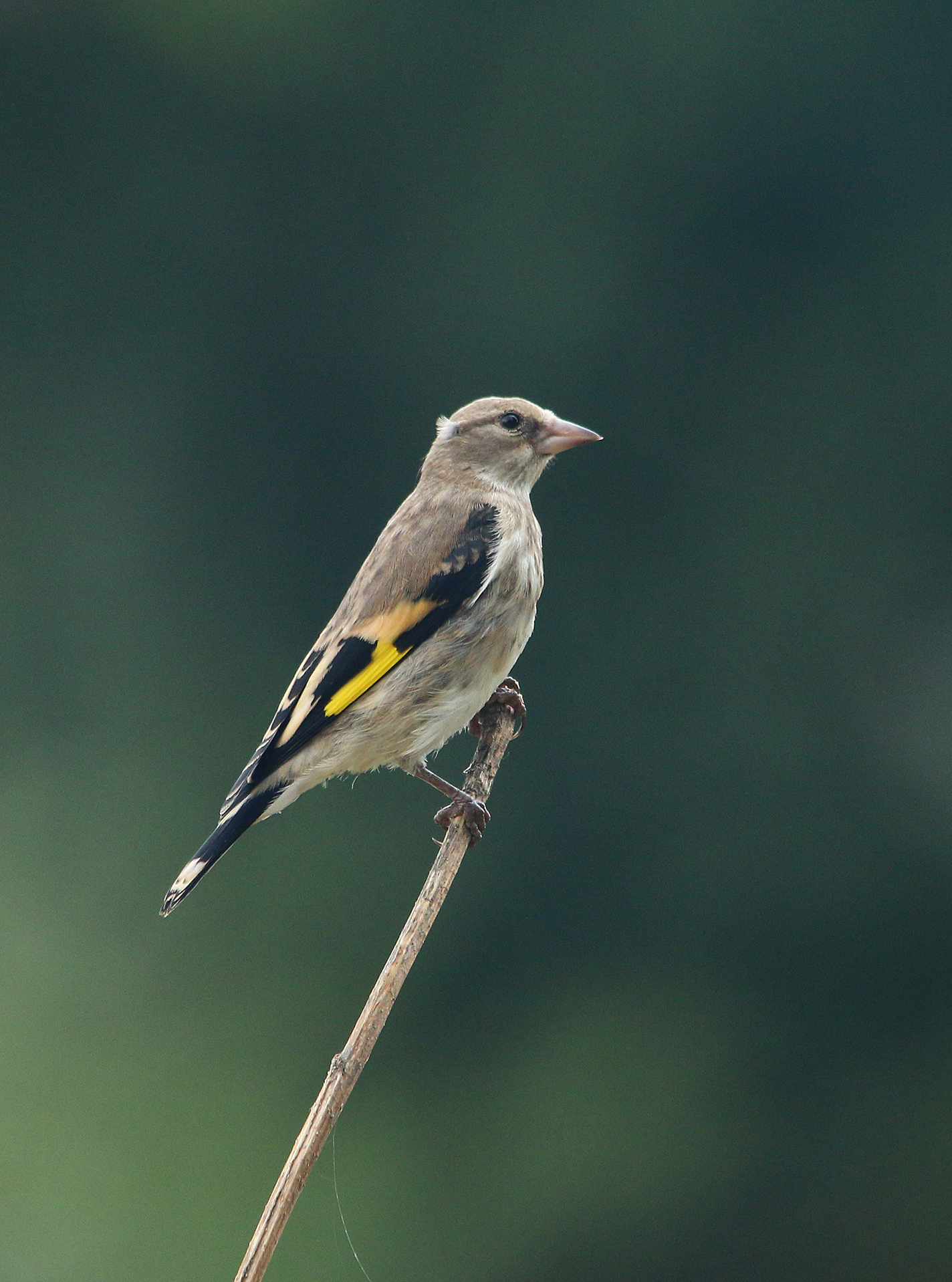
juvenile of subspecies C. c. caniceps in Gilgit-Baltistan, Pakistan

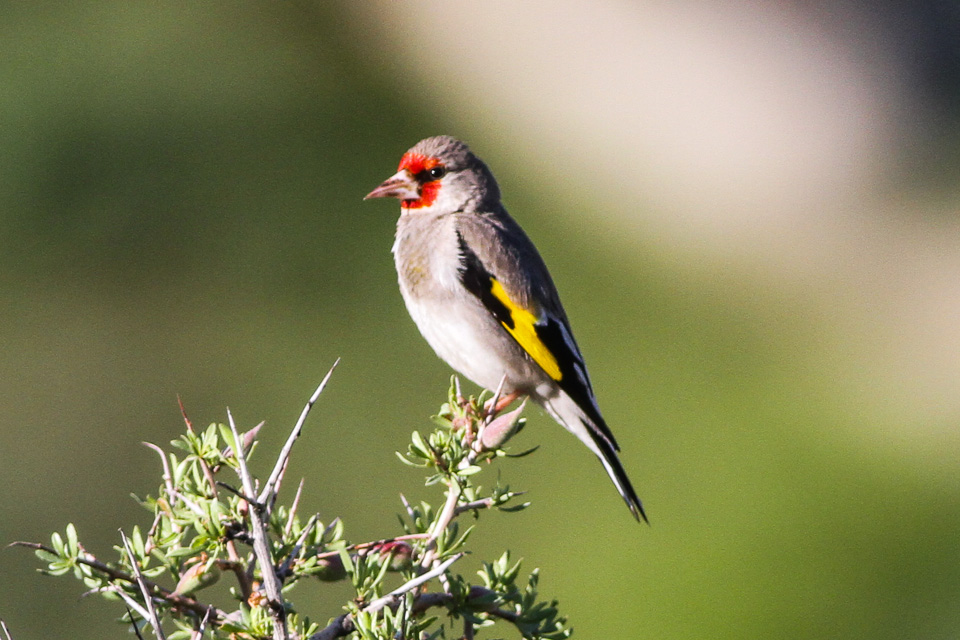
subspecies C. c. paropanisi in Uzbekistan

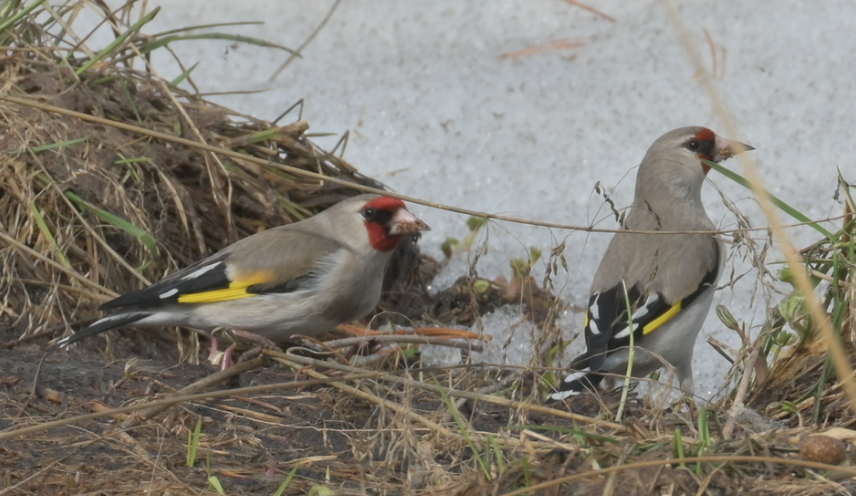
subspecies C. c. subulata in Russia
