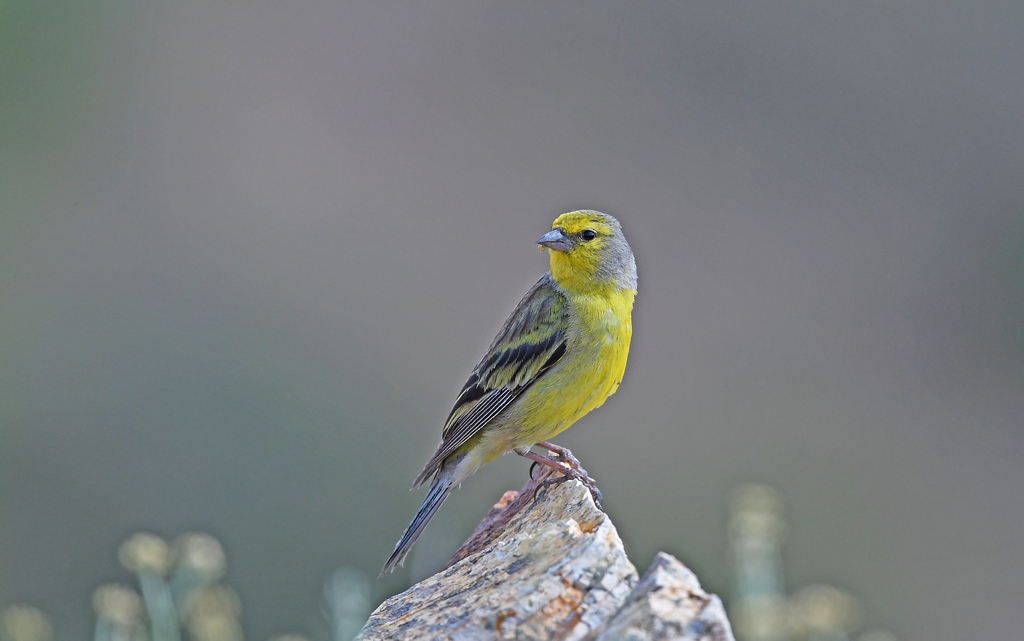
- male

Conservation status
- Least Concern (IUCN 3.1)

Scientific classification
- Kingdom: Animalia
- Phylum: Chordata
- Class: Aves
- Order: Passeriformes
- Family: Fringillidae
- Subfamily: Carduelinae
- Genus: Carduelis
- Species: C. corsicana

Binomial name
- Carduelis corsicana (Koenig, 1899)

Synonyms
- Citrinellus corsicanus Koenig, 1899; Serinus citrinella corsicana (Koenig, 1899); Serinus corsicana (Koenig, 1899)

= Corsican finch =

Species of bird

The Corsican finch (Carduelis corsicana), also known as the Corsican citril finch or Mediterranean citril finch, is a species of passerine bird belonging to the family Fringillidae, the "true" finches. This species is native to Corsica and Sardinia and nearby islands in France and Italy.

== Taxonomy ==
The Corsican finch was first formally formal description as Citrinella corsicana in 1899 by the German zoologist Alexander Koenig with its type locality given as Corsica. It was formerly regarded a subspecies of the citril finch (C. citrinella), but it differs in morphology and vocalizations as well as mtDNA sequence and they are now considered distinct species. The Corsican finch is classified within the genus Carduelis, with the citril finch being its closest relative, although the Corsican finch split from the citril finch lineage around 1.37 million years ago. However, they are more closely related to one another than either is to the European goldfinch (C. carduelis). The genus Carduelis is classified within the subfamily Carduelinae of the family Fringillidae.

The phylogenetic relationships among the Carduelis species are shown below, based on the data by the Cornell Lab of Ornithology.

- Carduelis
  - - Grey-crowned goldfinch, C. caniceps
    - European goldfinch, C. carduelis
  - - Citril finch, C. citrinella
    - Corsican finch, C. corsicana

== Description ==
The Corsican finch is a small finch, with a length of between 11.5 and 12.5 cm (4.5 and 4.9 in). It is very similar to the citril finch but it has a brown back marked with dark streaks and the yellow underparts and face have less of a green tinge than seen in the citril finch. It also has greyish rather than olive uppertail coverts. The colours of the females are duller than the males.

=== Vocalisations ===
The Corsican finch has vocalisations similar to those of the citril finch but the flight call has been described as weaker and more tremulous while the song is longer, with more structure and has been compared to that of a Eurasian wren (Troglodytes troglodytes).

== Distribution and habitat ==
The Corsican finch is found on Corsica and Sardinia as well as the islands of Gorgona, Capraia and Elba in the Tuscan Archipelago. During the breeding season the Corsican finch is found from lowland garrigue up to montane areas where it inhabits dry scrub and conifer forests, mainly of European black pine (Pinus nigra) and maritime pine (P. pinaster), which may be open or semi open. It can also be found in heathland with Tree heath (Erica) and bushes, mostly Genista and bramble (Rubus), as well as alder (Alnus) groves and areas where there are lightly scattered conifers. In subalpine zones this species occurs in low juniper (Juniperus). When not breeding these birds make local movements into areas of scrub in lowland valleys, plains and coastal areas.

== Biology ==
The Corsican finch is an altitudinal migrant, with montaine breeding birds spending the non breeding season at lower elevations. The breeding season occurs from mid-march to, at least, June. They build a nest which is a loosely woven, shallow cup of fine grasses, plant fibres and down, moss, animal hair and feathers. The nest is typically located up to 3 m (9.8 ft) above the ground in low shrubs or trees. The clutch is between two and five eggs. The diet of the Corsican finchIincluds the seeds of European black pine, grasses (Poa, Briza) and herbs. In Sardinia this species feeds on the larval and pupal stages of ermine moths.
