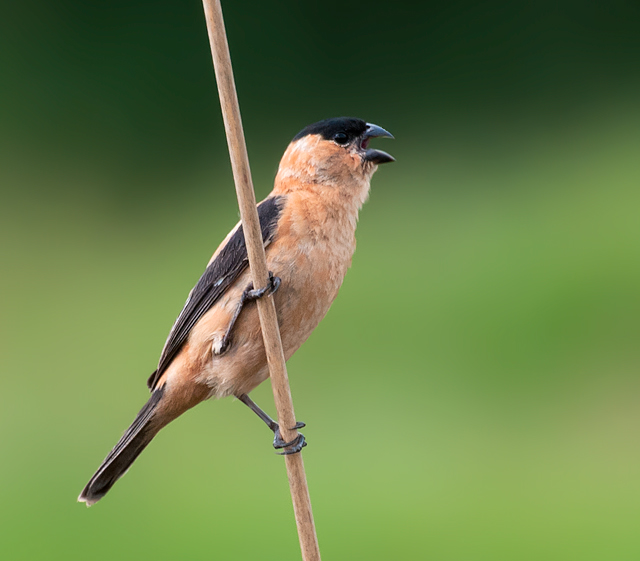
- Male at Mogi das Cruzes, São Paulo State, Brazil
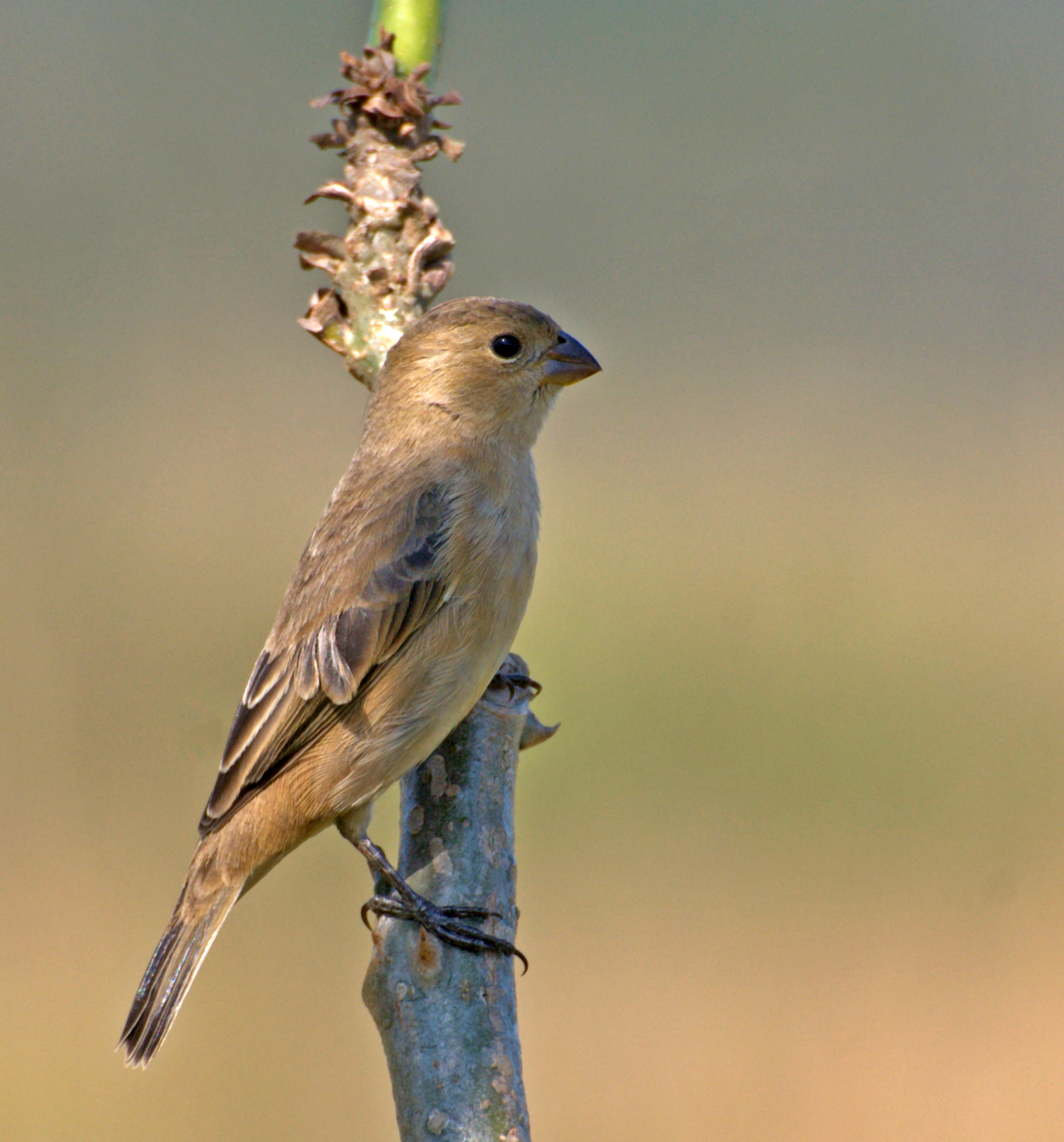
- A young female at Mogi das Cruzes, São Paulo State, Brazil

Conservation status
- Least Concern (IUCN 3.1)

Scientific classification
- Kingdom: Animalia
- Phylum: Chordata
- Class: Aves
- Order: Passeriformes
- Family: Thraupidae
- Genus: Sporophila
- Species: S. bouvreuil

Binomial name
- Sporophila bouvreuil (Müller, PLS, 1776)

= Copper seedeater =

Species of bird

The copper seedeater (Sporophila bouvreuil) is a species of bird in the family Thraupidae, the tanagers and allies. It is found in Brazil, Paraguay, Suriname, and as a vagrant to French Guiana.

== Taxonomy and systematics ==
The copper seedeater has a complicated taxonomic history. It was formally described in 1776 with the binomial Loxia bouvreuil. By 1938 it had been reassigned to the genus Sporophila. The genus was then in the family Fringillidae. By 1970 the genus had been reassigned to the family Emberizidae. Based on studies published between 1988 and 2011, beginning in 2012 Sporophila was moved to the tanager family Thraupidae.

The copper seedeater is monotypic. However, what is now the pearly-bellied seedeater (S. pileata) was previously a subspecies; together they were called the "capped seedeater". Taxonomic systems began splitting them in 2012. Two other taxa were also previously assigned as subspecies of the capped seedeater, S. b. saturata and S. b. crypta, but in 2011 they were determined to be invalid.

== Description ==
The copper seedeater is 9.5 to 10 cm (3.7 to 3.9 in) long. It is one of the smallest of its genus. It has a short, thick bill with a rounded culmen. The species is sexually dimorphic. Adult males have a black cap down to the eye. The rest of their head and their body are cinnamon and their tail is blackish. Their wings are blackish with cinnamon-brown to whitish edges on the coverts and tertials. Their wing's primaries have white bases that show as a white rectangle on the folded wing. Their thighs are black. Females have an olive-brown head and upperparts. Their wings and tail are a slightly darker olive-brown. Their throat and underparts are mostly ochre-buff with a whitish belly. Both sexes have a dark brown iris, a blackish bill, and blackish legs. Juveniles resemble adult females.

== Distribution and habitat ==
The copper seedeater has a highly disjunct distribution. By far its largest range is in eastern and southeastern Brazil south of a line very roughly from the Atlantic in Maranhão southwest to northeastern Paraguay and north of a line from there in a downward-open arc ending at the Atlantic in southern São Paulo state. (Note: Some sources do not include Paraguay in the species' range but the South American Classification Committee (SACC) has records there.) Much smaller ranges are at the mouth of the Amazon River in Brazi's Amapá and Pará states, in Suriname, and at scattered locations in the Brazilian Amazon. (Note: Some of those sources also place the species in French Guiana, but the SACC records it only as a vagrant there.)

The copper seedeater inhabits open Cerrado, Caatinga, savanna, and tall grasslands. In elevation it ranges from sea level to 600 m (2,000 ft) in the breeding season and "almost certainly higher in [the] non-breeding period".

== Behavior ==
=== Movement ===
The copper seedeater is a partial migrant. It is apparently a year-round resident of the Cerrado and Caatinga biomes though some movements there are suspected. The populations that breed in the Amazon Basin apparently move into the Cerrado and Caatinga for the non-breeding season of April to August. The species does concentrate in areas with seeding grasses.

=== Feeding ===
The copper seedeater feeds on grass seeds. It typically feeds while clinging to stems but it will feed on the ground. During the breeding season it usually forages in pairs and at other times it might forage in small groups that include other seed-eating species.

=== Breeding ===
With the exception of its apparent migratory behavior, nothing is known about the copper seedeater's breeding biology.

=== Vocalization ===
The copper seedeater's usual song is "a series of sweet whistles that fall in pitch, twee tweeta cheew tweeta phwee". Another song is "described as long, hurried, with varied notes, and tempo of siskin (Carduelis)". Its call is "a strident tslit or a two-note ewt-eet".

== Status ==
The IUCN has assessed the copper seedeater as being of Least Concern. It has an extremely large range; its population size is not known and is believed to be decreasing. Though no immediate threats have been identified, the species "has been reported as used in trade at a high prevalence, being found in three of the seven trade datasets evaluated". It is considered "frequent to uncommon" in Brazil. "Much of this species’ habitat is being burnt, being converted to the growing of soybean or sunflowers, or being overgrazed, and populations therefore [are] likely to be declining."
