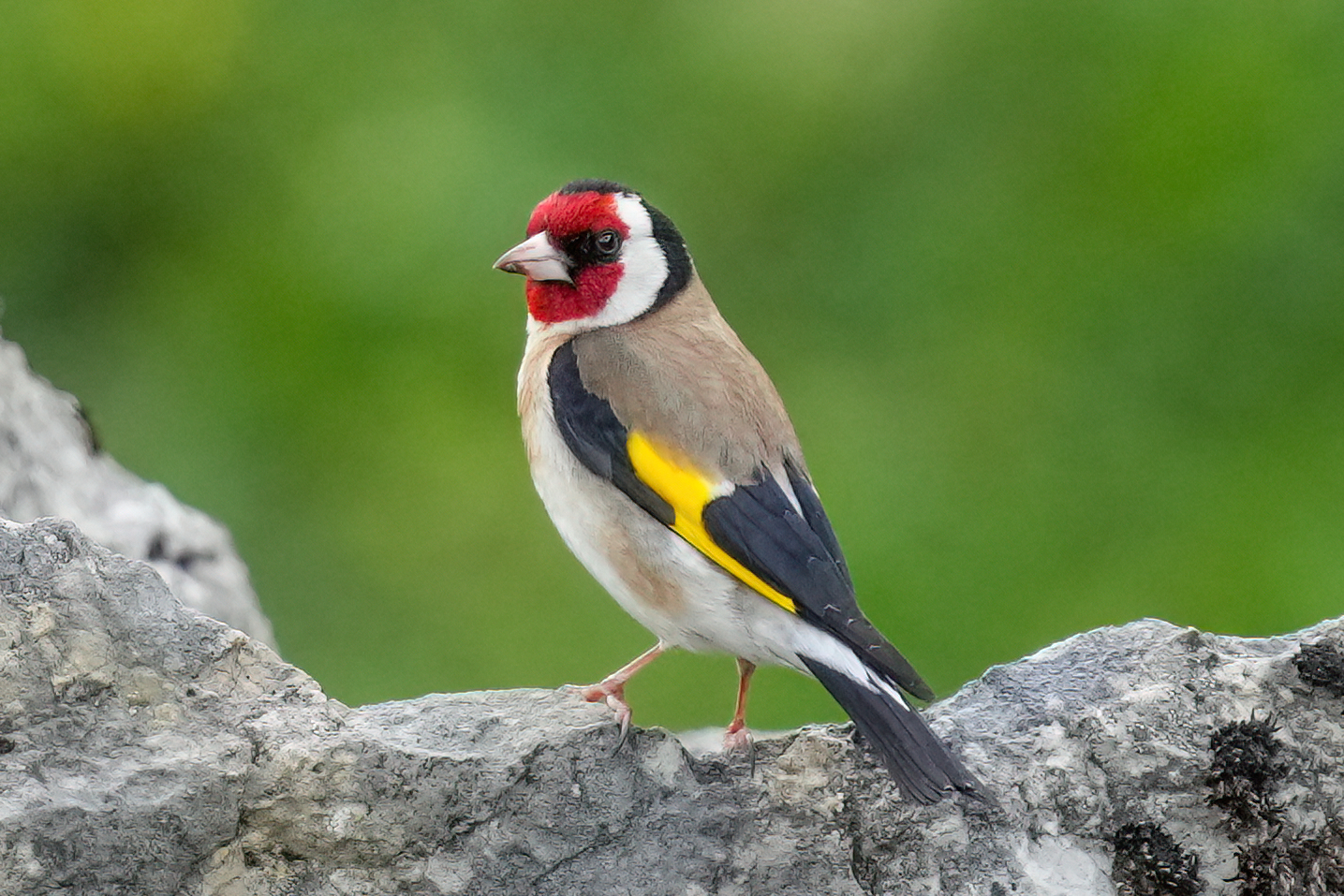
- C. c. carduelis in Switzerland
- Male C. c. britannica recorded in Gloucestershire, England

Conservation status
- Least Concern (IUCN 3.1)

Scientific classification
- Kingdom: Animalia
- Phylum: Chordata
- Class: Aves
- Order: Passeriformes
- Family: Fringillidae
- Subfamily: Carduelinae
- Genus: Carduelis
- Species: C. carduelis

Binomial name
- Carduelis carduelis (Linnaeus, 1758)
- Breeding Summer visitor Breeding Resident Non-breeding winter visitor Introduced Introduced (now extinct)

Synonyms
- Fringilla carduelis Linnaeus, 1758; Carduelis communis Dumont, 1823; Carduelis elegans Stephens, 1826

= European goldfinch =

Species of bird

The European goldfinch, or simply goldfinch (Carduelis carduelis), is a small passerine bird in the finch family that is native to the Palearctic zone in Europe, northern Africa, and western Asia. It has been introduced to other areas, including Australia, New Zealand, Uruguay and the United States.

The breeding male has a red face with black markings around the eyes, and a black-and-white head. Its back and flanks are buff or chestnut brown. Its black wings feature a broad yellow bar. Its tail is black and its rump is white. Males and females are very similar, but females have a slightly smaller red area on their face.

The goldfinch is often depicted in Italian Renaissance paintings of the Madonna and Child.

== Taxonomy ==
The European goldfinch was one of the birds described and illustrated by Swiss naturalist Conrad Gessner in his Historiae animalium of 1555. The first formal description was by Carl Linnaeus in the 10th edition of his Systema Naturae published in 1758. He introduced the binomial name, Fringilla carduelis. Carduelis is the Latin word for 'goldfinch'. The European goldfinch is now placed in the genus Carduelis that was introduced by the French zoologist Mathurin Jacques Brisson in 1760 by tautonomy based on Linnaeus's specific epithet. Modern molecular genetic studies have shown that the European goldfinch is closely related to the grey-crowned goldfinch (Carduelis caniceps), the citril finch (Carduelis citrinella) and the Corsican finch (Carduelis corsicana).

The English word 'goldfinch' was first used in the second half of the 14th century by Geoffrey Chaucer in his unfinished The Cook's Tale: "Gaillard he was as goldfynch in the shawe (Gaily dressed he was as is a goldfinch in the woods)".

=== Subspecies ===
Ten subspecies of the European goldfinch are now accepted following the split of the grey-headed caniceps group as a separate species.

- C. c. britannica (Hartert, 1903) – the British Isles
- C. c. carduelis (Linnaeus, 1758) – most of the European mainland, Scandinavia
- C. c. parva Tschusi, 1901 – Iberia, northwest Africa, and the Atlantic Macaronesia islands (the Canary Islands, Madeira)
- C. c. tschusii Arrigoni degli Oddi, 1902 – Corsica, Sardinia, Sicily
- C. c. balcanica Sachtleben, 1919 – southeastern Europe (Balkans, Greece, Crete, NW Turkey)
- C. c. niediecki Reichenow, 1907 – southwest Asia (Rhodes, Karpathos, Cyprus, Egypt to Asia Minor, northern Iraq, southwest Iran), northeast Africa
- C. c. brevirostris Zarudny, 1890 – eastern Turkey, the southern Caucasus, and northwestern Iran
- C. c. colchica Koudashev, 1915 – Crimea and the northern Caucasus
- C. c. volgensis Buturlin, 1906 – southern Ukraine, southwestern Russia and northwestern Kazakhstan
- C. c. frigoris Wolters, 1953 – western Siberia

The former caniceps group of subspecies, containing subspecies C. c. caniceps, C. c. paropanisi, C. c. subulata, and C. c. ultima, were shifted to a separate species, the grey-crowned goldfinch, by the International Ornithological Congress in 2023.

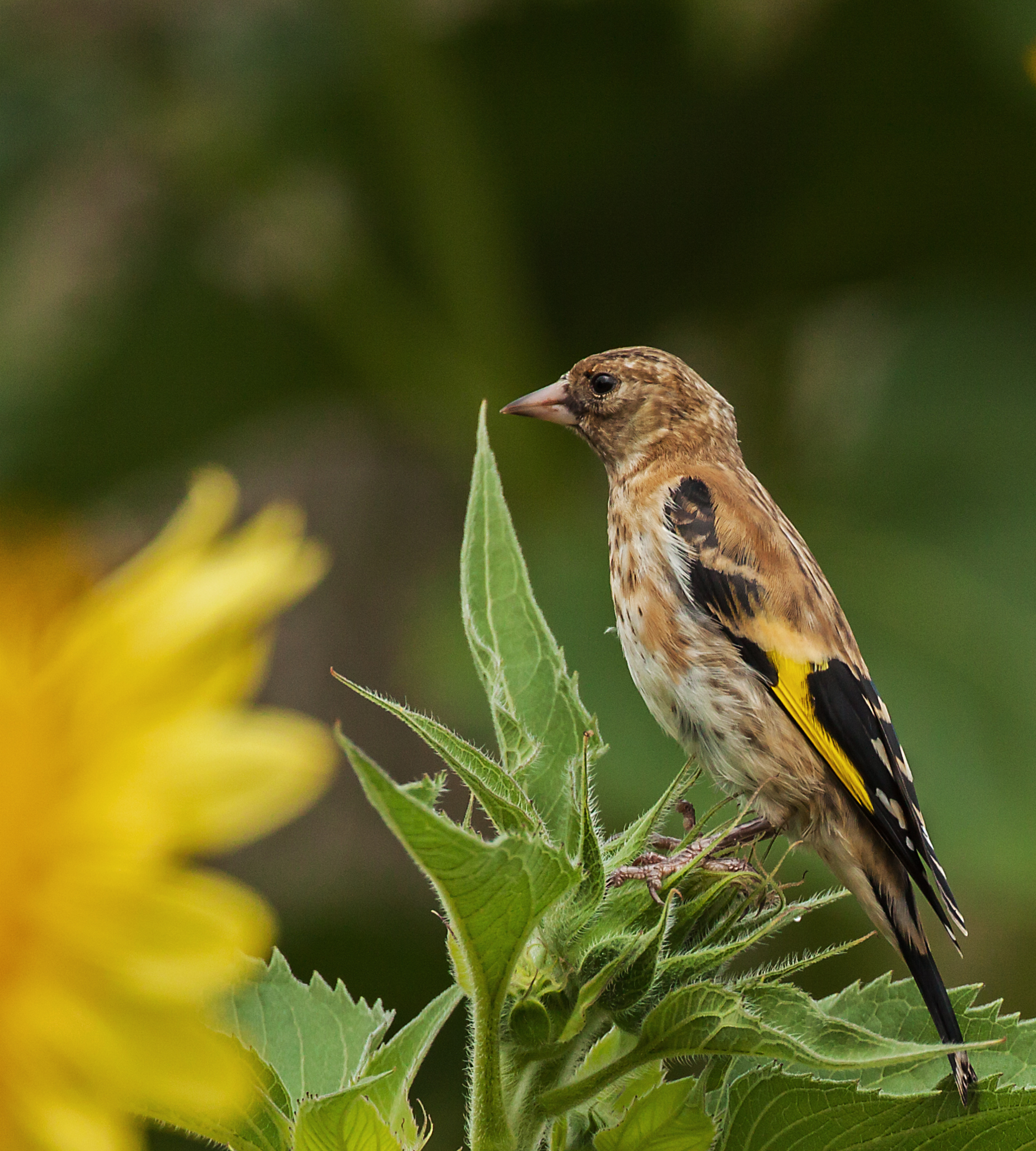
C. c. carduelis, juvenile, Germany

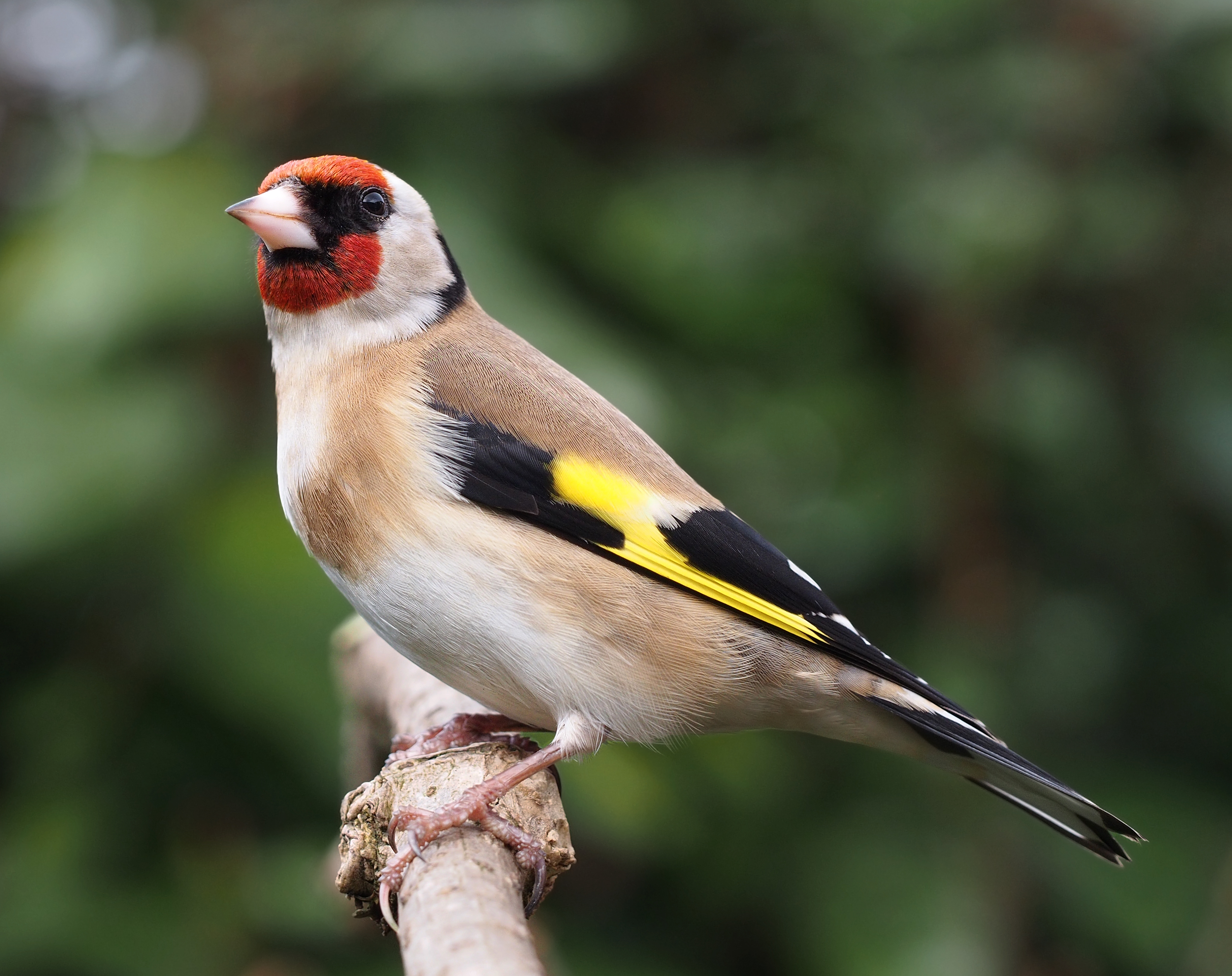
C. c. britannica, Wigan, England

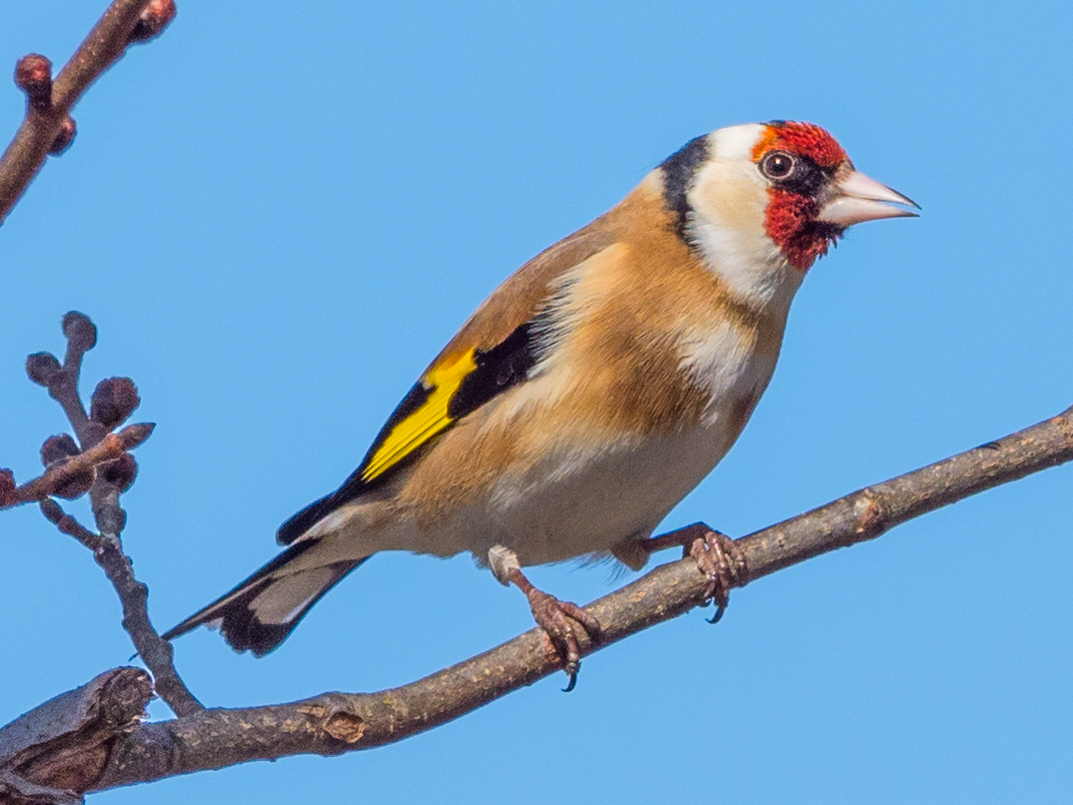
C. c. carduelis, Sweden

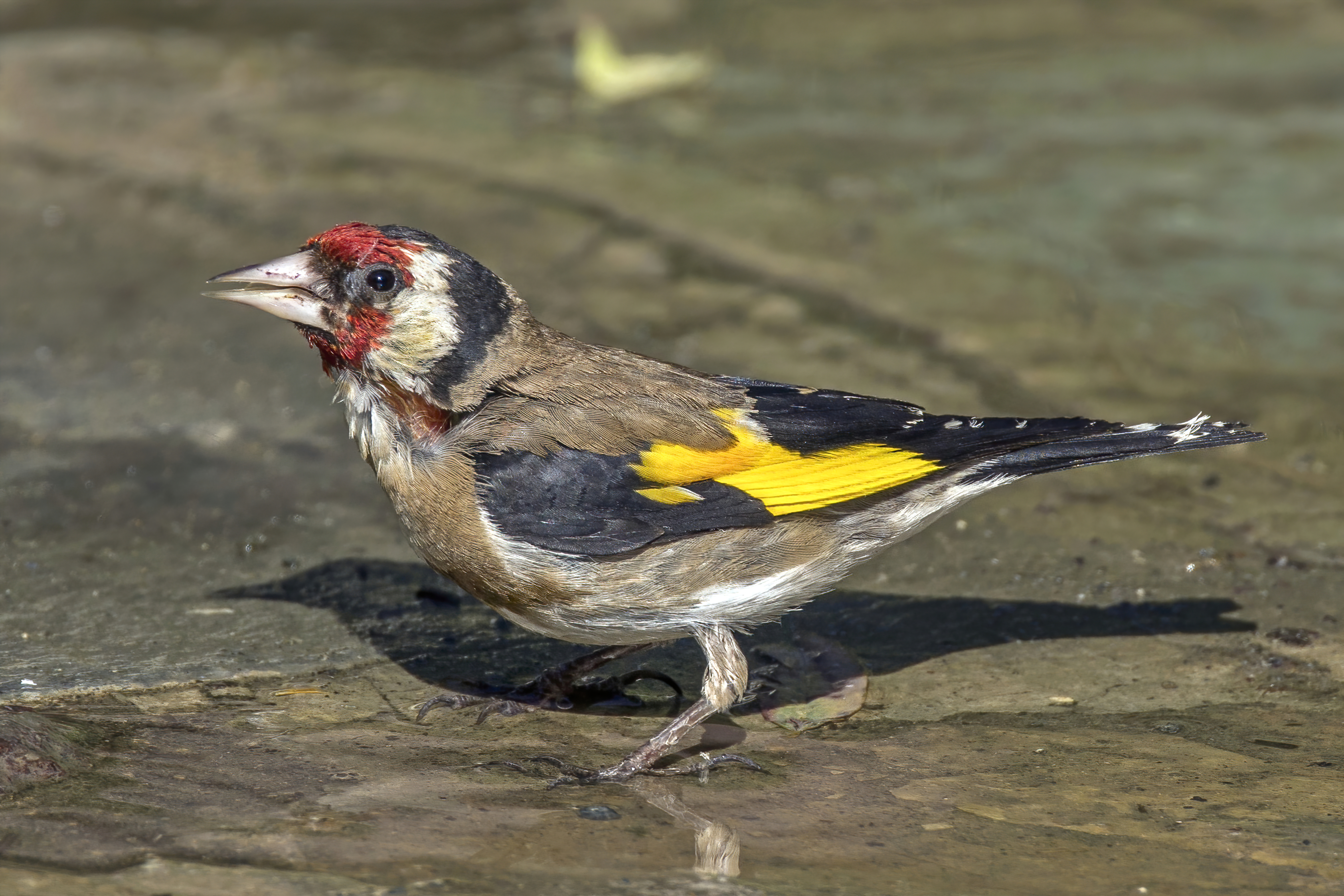
C. c. niediecki, Cyprus

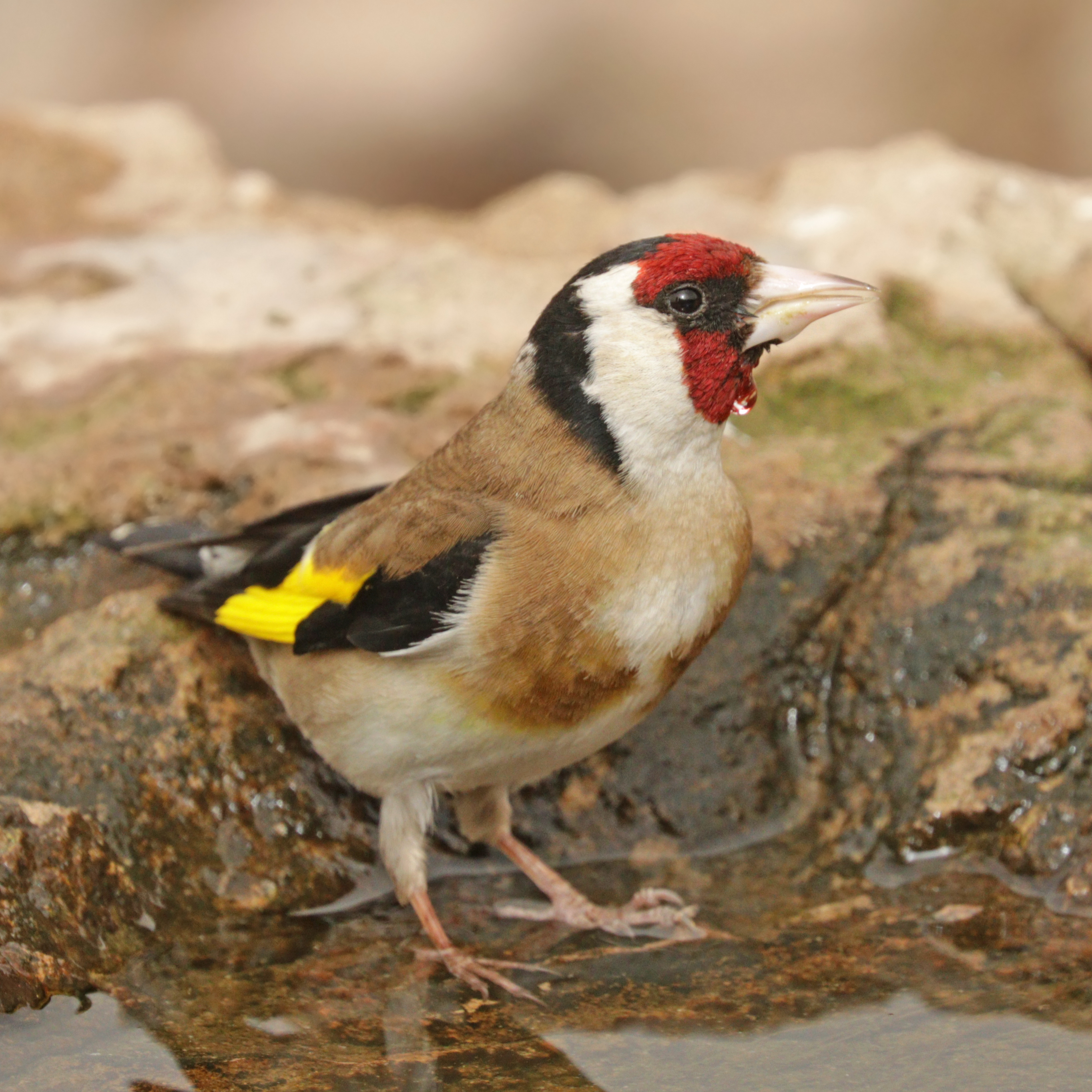
C. c. parva, Morocco

== Phylogeny ==
The European goldfinch originated in the late Miocene-Pliocene and belongs to the clade of cardueline finches. The grey-crowned goldfinch, citril finch and Corsican finch are its sister taxa. Their closest relatives are the greenfinches, crossbills and redpolls. The monophyly of the subfamily Carduelinae is suggested in previous studies.

The phylogenetic relationships among the Carduelis species are shown below, based on the data by the Cornell Lab of Ornithology.

- Carduelis
  - - Grey-crowned goldfinch, C. caniceps
    - European goldfinch, C. carduelis
  - - Citril finch, C. citrinella
    - Corsican finch, C. corsicana

== Description ==
The average European goldfinch is 12–13 cm (4.7–5.1 in) long, has a wingspan of 21–25 cm (8.3–9.8 in) and weighs 14 to 19 g (0.49 to 0.67 oz). There is little difference between the sexes, both having a red face, black and white head, warm brown upperparts, white underparts with buff flanks and breast patches, and black and yellow wings.

Male European goldfinches can often be distinguished on close inspection by the larger, darker red mask that extends just behind the eye. Their shoulder feathers are black, whereas those of the female are brown. The red face of the female does not extend past the eye. They have an ivory-coloured, long, pointed bill and a forked tail. Goldfinches in breeding condition have a pale bill with a grey or black mark at the tip, whereas the rest of the year they have a darker bill. Juveniles have a plain head and a greyer back, but they are unmistakable due to the yellow wing stripe. Adults moult after the breeding season, with some individuals beginning in July and others not completing their moult until November. After moult birds appear less colourful, until the tips of the newly grown feathers wear away.

The song can be described as a pleasant silvery twittering. The call is a melodic tickeLIT, and the song is a tinkling medley of trills and twitters, but always including the tri-syllabic call phrase or a teLLIT-teLLIT-teLLIT.

== Distribution and habitat ==
The European goldfinch is native to Europe, North Africa, and western and central Asia. It inhabits open, partially wooded lowlands and is resident in the milder western regions of its habitat, but migrates from colder areas. Even in the west, it will make local movements to escape bad weather. The species has been introduced to many other parts of the world. It was introduced to Bermuda, Canada, the United States, Mexico, Peru, Argentina, Chile, the Falkland Islands, Uruguay, Brazil, South Africa, Australia, and New Zealand in the 19th century, and their populations quickly increased and their range expanded greatly. In Australia, they now occur from Brisbane to the Eyre Peninsula, and are also spread throughout New Zealand. In the United States, they have become established in the western Great Lakes region.

== Behaviour and ecology ==
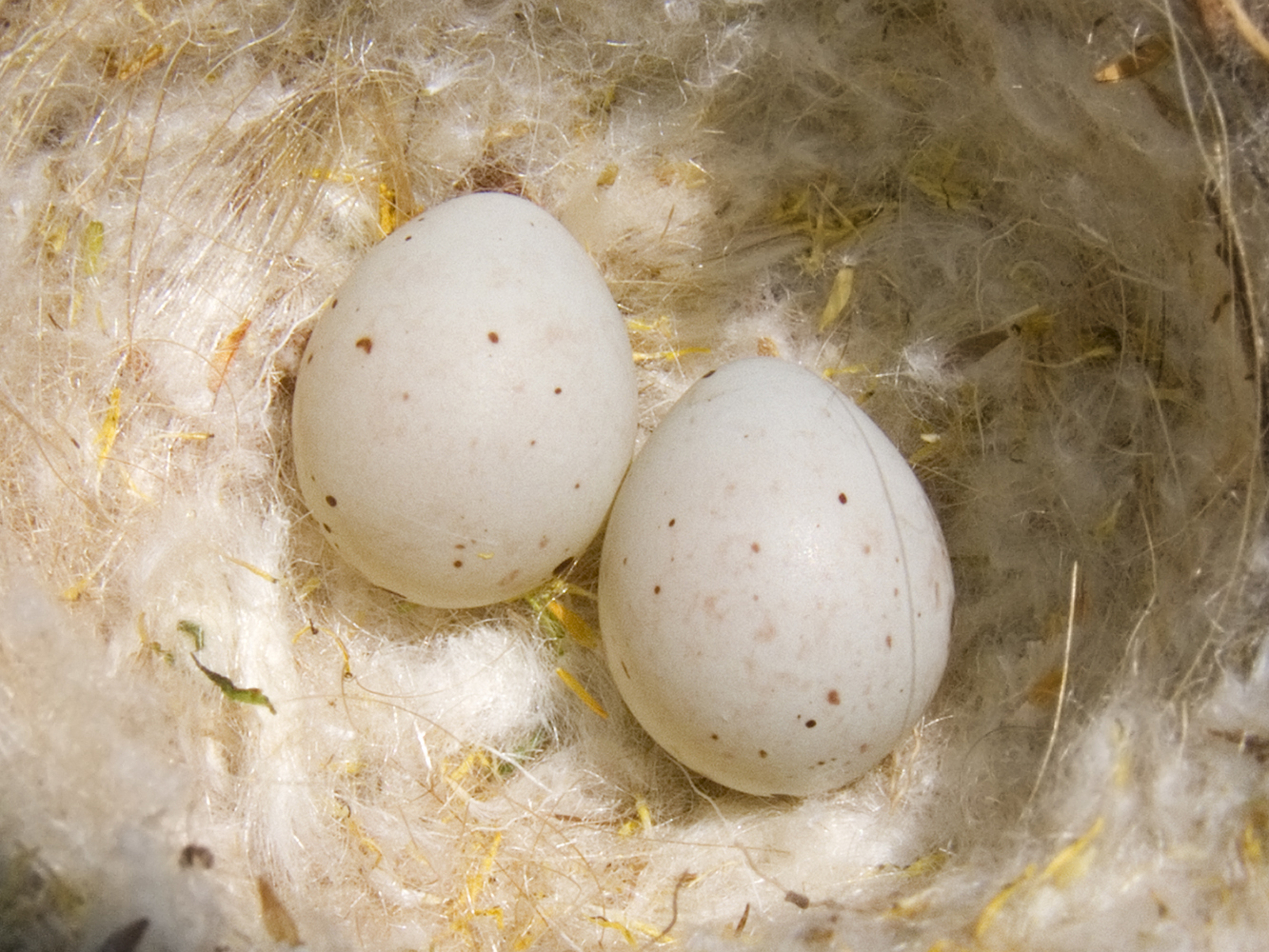
A European goldfinch nest and eggs

=== Breeding ===
The female builds the nest entirely herself, generally completing it within a week. The male accompanies her, but does not contribute. The neat, compact nest is usually located several metres above the ground and hidden by leaves and twigs at the end of a swaying branch. It is made of moss and lichen and is lined with plant down, such as that from thistles. It is attached to the twigs of the tree with spider silk. A deep cup prevents eggs from being lost in windy weather. A few days after the nest is completed, the eggs are laid in the early morning at regular intervals. The clutch is typically 4–6 eggs, which are whitish with reddish-brown speckles. They have a smooth surface and are slightly glossy. The average size is 17.3 mm × 13.0 mm (0.68 in × 0.51 in) with a calculated weight of 1.53 g (0.054 oz). The eggs are incubated for 11–13 days by the female, who is fed by the male. The chicks are fed by both parents. Initially they receive a mixture of seeds and insects, but as they grow the proportion of insect material decreases. For the first 7–9 days the young are brooded by the female. The nestlings fledge 13–18 days after hatching. The young birds are fed by both parents for a further 7–9 days. The parents typically raise two broods each year and occasionally three.

=== Feeding ===
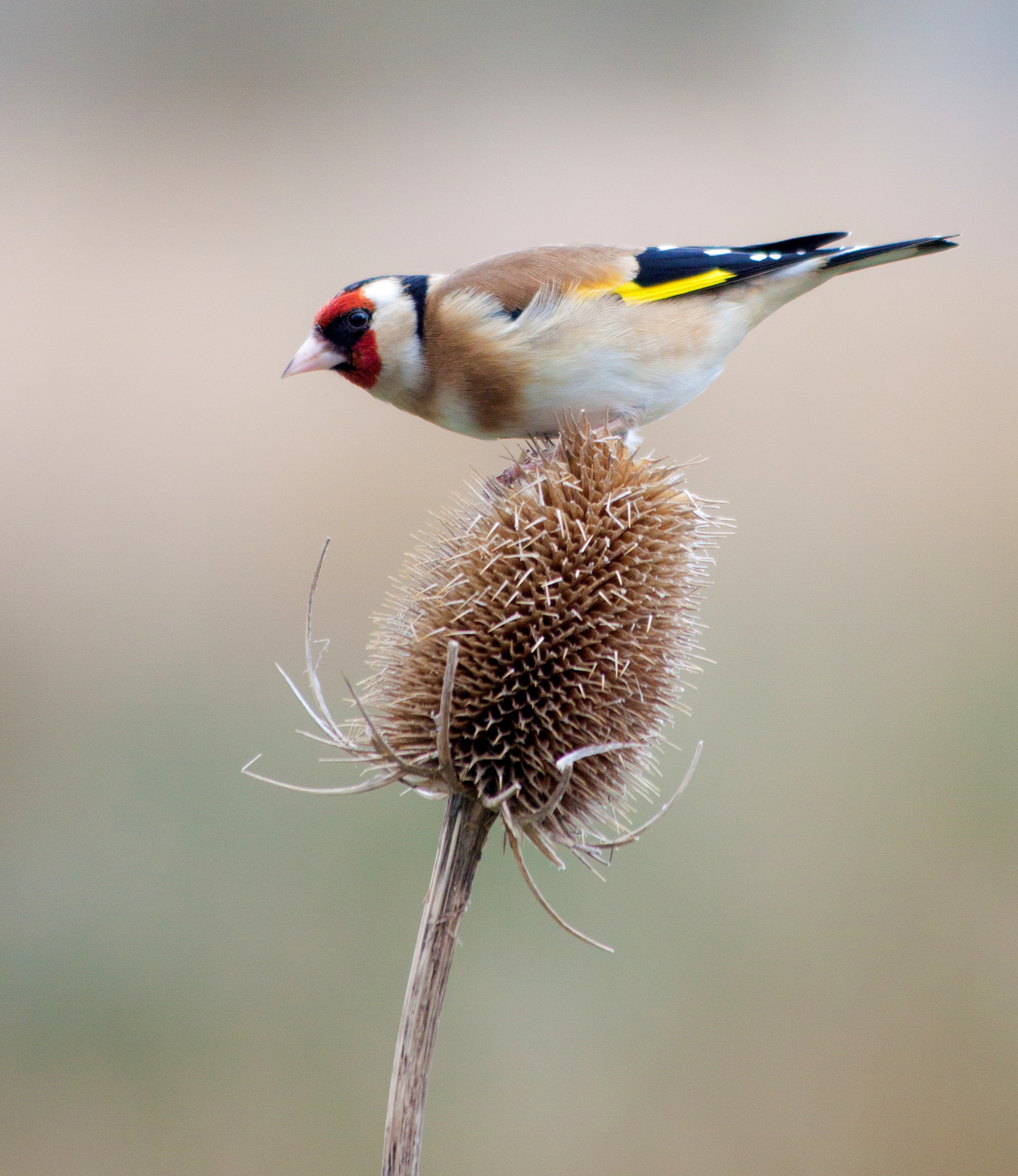
Goldfinch eating teasel (Dipsacus fullonum) seeds, Scotland

The European goldfinch's preferred food is small seeds such as beige-coloured sunflower hearts and those from thistles (the Latin name is from Carduus, a genus of thistles), cornflowers, and teasels, but it also eats insects when it feeds its young. They also regularly visit bird feeders in winter. During this time, European goldfinches group together to form flocks of up to 40, and occasionally more. They are attracted to back gardens in Europe and North America by birdfeeders containing niger (commercially described as nyjer) seed. This small oily seed comes from an annual native to Africa. Special polycarbonate feeders with small oval slits through which the European goldfinches feed are sometimes used. They are experts at using their tweezerlike bills to extract hard-to-get seeds from plants. One European Goldfinch in Armenia ate 30 seeds from a sunflower head in a single hour.

== Relationships with humans ==
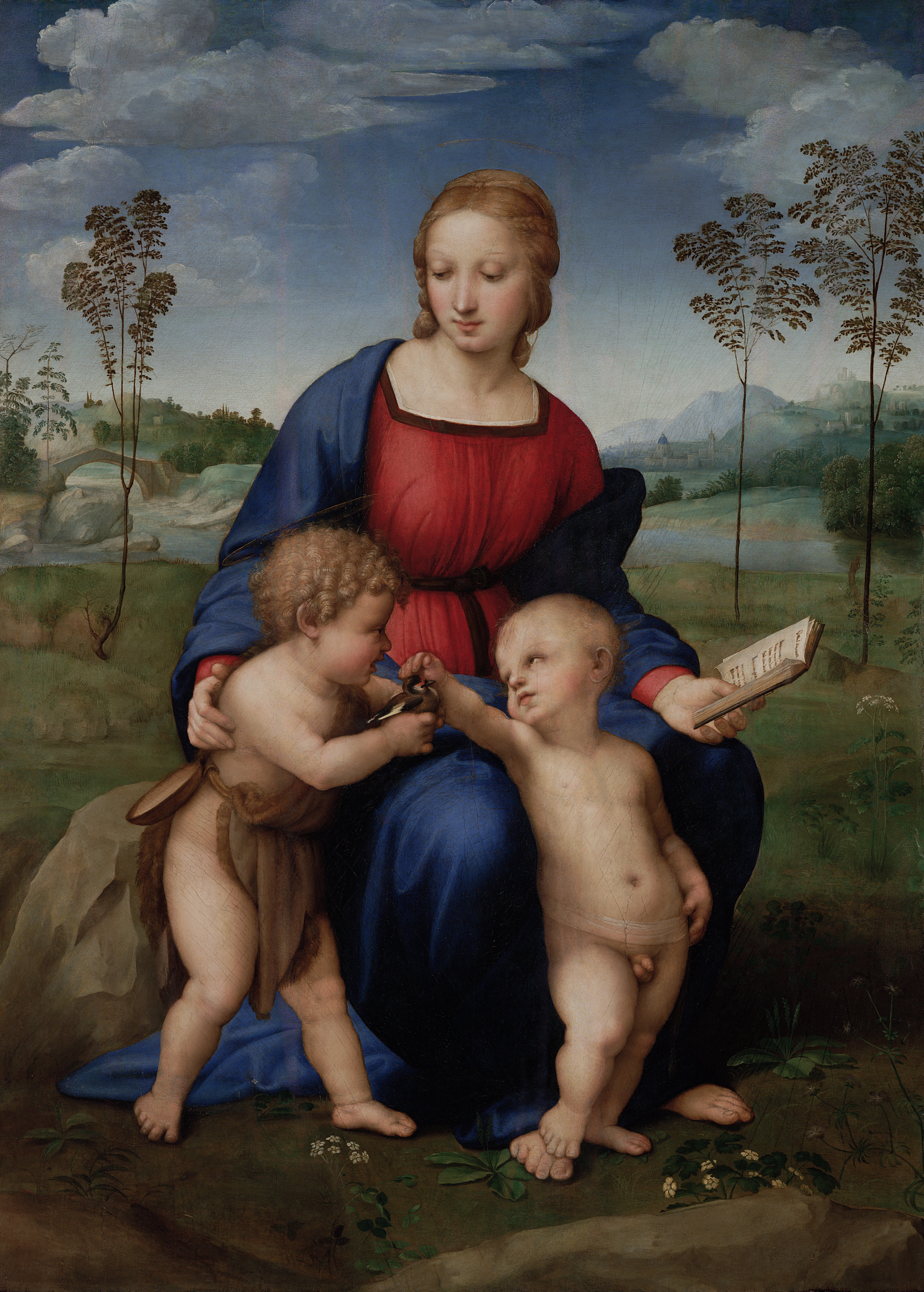
Madonna of the Goldfinch by Raphael, c. 1505–6

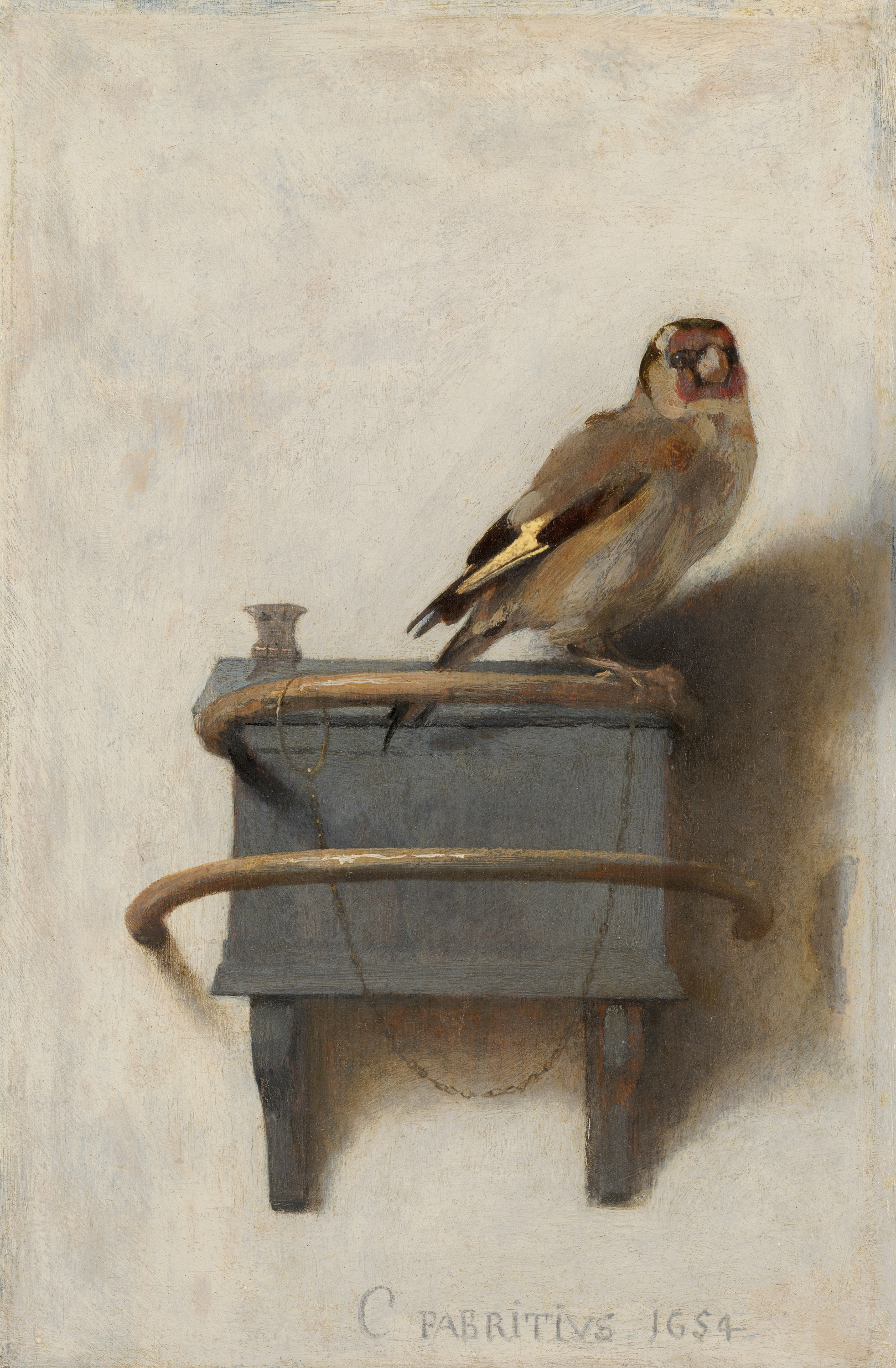
The Goldfinch by Carel Fabritius, 1654

European goldfinches are commonly kept and bred in captivity around the world thanks to their distinctive appearance and pleasant song. However, if they are kept with domestic canaries, they tend to lose their native song and call in favour of their cagemates' songs. This is considered undesirable, as it detracts from the appeal of keeping them. In 19th century Great Britain, many thousands of European goldfinches were trapped each year to be sold as cage birds. One of the earliest campaigns of the Royal Society for the Protection of Birds was directed against this trade. Wildlife conservation attempts to limit bird trapping and the destruction of the open-space habitats of European goldfinches.

Steglitz, a borough of the German city of Berlin, is named after the European goldfinch. The surname Goldspink is based on the Scots word for the European goldfinch.

=== Christian symbolism ===
Because of the thistle seeds it eats, in Christian symbolism the European goldfinch is associated with Christ's Passion and his crown of thorns. The European goldfinch, appearing in pictures of the Madonna and Christ child, represents the foreknowledge Jesus and Mary had of the Crucifixion. Examples include the Madonna del Cardellino or Madonna of the Goldfinch, painted by the Italian Renaissance artist Raphael in about 1505–6, in which John the Baptist offers a European goldfinch to Christ in a warning of his future. In Barocci's Holy Family, a European goldfinch is held in the hand of John the Baptist, who holds it high out of reach of an interested cat. In Cima da Conegliano's Madonna and Child, a European goldfinch flutters in the hand of the Christ child. It is also an emblem of endurance, fruitfulness, and persistence. Because it symbolizes the Passion, the European goldfinch is considered a "saviour" bird and may be pictured with the common housefly (which represents sin and disease). The European goldfinch is also associated with Saint Jerome and appears in some depictions of him.

=== Depictions in art ===
Antonio Vivaldi composed a Concerto in D major for Flute "Il Gardellino" (RV 428, Op. 10 No. 3), where the singing of the European goldfinch is imitated by a flute. An anonymous Italian Neapolitan poem titled Il Cardellino was put to music by Saverio Mercadante and sung by Jose Carreras.

European goldfinches, with their "wanton freak" and "yellow flutterings", are among the many natural "luxuries" that delight the speaker of John Keats' poem 'I stood tip-toe upon a little hill...' (1816).

In the poem The Great Hunger by Patrick Kavanagh, the European goldfinch is one of the rare glimpses of beauty in the life of an elderly Irish farmer:

The goldfinches on the railway paling were worth looking at
A man might imagine then
Himself in Brazil and these birds the birds of paradise

Donna Tartt's novel The Goldfinch won the 2014 Pulitzer Prize for Fiction. A turning point in the plot occurs when the narrator, Theo, sees his mother's favourite painting, Carel Fabritius's The Goldfinch, in the Metropolitan Museum of Art.

== Sources ==
- Cramp, Stanley; Perrins, C.M., eds. (1994). Handbook of birds of Europe the Middle East and North Africa: Birds of the Western Palearctic, Volume 8: Crows to Finches. Oxford: Oxford University Press. ISBN 0-19-854679-3.
- Newton, Ian (1972). Finches. The New Naturalist, Volume 55. London: Collins. ISBN 0-00-213065-3.
