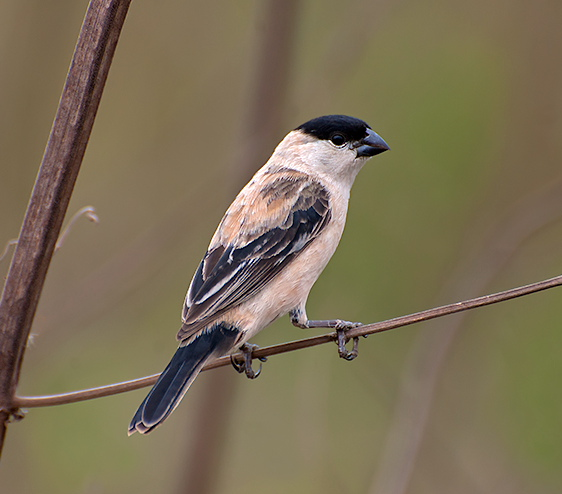
- at Santa Bárbara d'Oeste, São Paulo state, Brazil

Conservation status
- Least Concern (IUCN 3.1)

Scientific classification
- Kingdom: Animalia
- Phylum: Chordata
- Class: Aves
- Order: Passeriformes
- Family: Thraupidae
- Genus: Sporophila
- Species: S. pileata

Binomial name
- Sporophila pileata (Sclater, PL, 1865)

= Pearly-bellied seedeater =

Species of bird

The pearly–bellied seedeater (Sporophila pileata) is a species of bird in the family Thraupidae, the tanagers and allies. It is found in Argentina, Brazil, Paraguay, Uruguay, and possibly Bolivia.

== Taxonomy and systematics ==
The pearly-bellied seedeater has a complicated taxonomic history. It was formally described in 1865 with the binomial Spermophila pileata. By 1938 it had been reclassified as a subspecies of Sporophila bouvreuil, then called the "pinkish seed-eater" and later the "capped seedeater". The genus Sporophila was then in the family Fringillidae. By 1970 the genus had been reassigned to the family Emberizidae. Taxonomic systems began splitting the capped seedeater in 2012, again recognizing pileata as a full species and renaming S. bouvreuil the copper seedeater. Not long after that, based on studies published between 1988 and 2011, Sporophila was moved to the tanager family Thraupidae.

The pearly-bellied seedeater is monotypic.

== Description ==
The pearly-bellied seedeater is about 10 cm (3.9 in) long and weighs 7.6 to 10 g (0.27 to 0.35 oz). It is one of the smallest of its genus. It has a short, thick bill with a rounded culmen. The species is sexually dimorphic. Adult males have a black cap down to the eye. Their face is off-white and their nape grayish pink. Their upperparts are mostly grayish pink with grayish brown uppertail coverts and a blackish tail. Their wings are blackish with very pale cinnamon-brown edges on the coverts and tertials. Their wing's primaries have white bases that show as a white rectangle on the folded wing. Their thighs are black. Females have an olive-brown head and upperparts. Their wings and tail are a slightly darker olive-brown with a small white primary patch on the former. Their throat and underparts are mostly ochre-buff with a whitish belly. Both sexes have a dark brown iris, a blackish bill, and blackish legs. Juveniles resemble adult females.

== Distribution and habitat ==
The pearly-bellied seedeater is found in Brazil south of a line roughly from northwestern Mato Grosso do Sul east to southeastern Goías and then south to the Atlantic in east-central São Paulo state; its southern extent in the country is northern Rio Grande do Sul and Santa Catarina. Its range continues west and south into eastern Paraguay, northeastern Argentina's Misiones and Corrientes provinces, and far northern Uruguay. Though one source includes Bolivia in the species' range others do not and the South American Classification Committee (SACC) has only unconfirmed records there.

The pearly-bellied seedeater inhabits open Cerrado, the ecotone between Cerrado and Atlantic Forest, savanna, and grasslands including the humid chaco. In elevation it ranges from sea level to 1,100 m (3,600 ft) in Brazil and to at least 1,200 m (3,900 ft) elsewhere.

== Behavior ==
=== Movement ===
The pearly-bellied seedeater is a year-round resident in most of its range. The populations in Uruguay, Argentina, and far southern Brazil move north for the March through October austral winter but their exact overwintering area is not known. The species' abundance in any one area varies with the timing of grasses' seeding.

=== Feeding ===
The pearly-bellied seedeater feeds on grass seeds. It typically feeds while clinging to stems but it will feed on the ground. During the breeding season it usually forages in pairs and at other times it forages in groups that include other seed-eating species and can be quite large.

=== Breeding ===
A team of researchers found 83 pearly-bellied seedeater nests in São Paulo state between November and March over a five-year period. The nests were "deep cups built of grass stems, inflorescences, and rootlets, attached with spider web". They were built in herbaceous plants in marshes between about 15 and 73 cm (6 and 29 in) above water or dry ground. The clutch size ranged from one to three eggs that were white, grayish, or greenish with dark spots.

=== Vocalization ===
The pearly-bellied seedeater's vocalizations have not been extensively studied but so far appear to be the same as those of its former "parent" the copper seedeater, which see here.

== Status ==
The IUCN has assessed the pearly-bellied seedeater as being of Least Concern. It has a very large range; its population size is not known and is believed to be decreasing. No immediate threats have been identified, and the species "has been reported as used in trade at a low prevalence". It is considered "frequent to uncommon" in Brazil. "Much of this species’ habitat is being burnt, being converted to the growing of soybean or sunflowers, or being overgrazed, and populations therefore likely to be declining."
