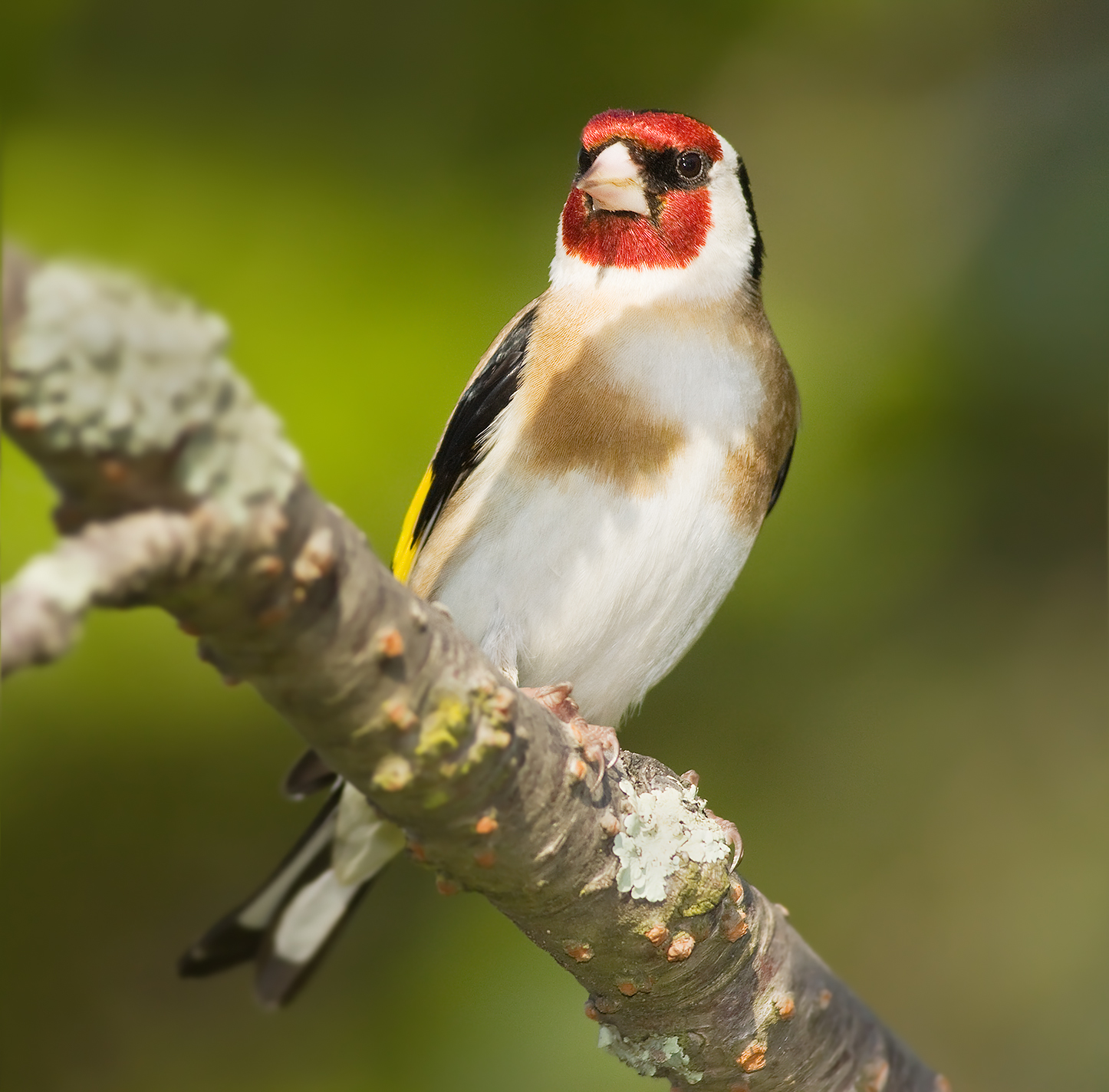
- The European goldfinch belongs to a group of red- or yellow-faced species

Scientific classification
- Kingdom: Animalia
- Phylum: Chordata
- Class: Aves
- Order: Passeriformes
- Family: Fringillidae
- Subfamily: Carduelinae
- Genus: Carduelis; Brisson, 1760

Type species
- Fringilla carduelis Linnaeus, 1758

Species
- 4, see text

= Carduelis =

Genus of birds

The genus Carduelis is a group of birds in the finch family Fringillidae.

The genus Carduelis was introduced by the French zoologist Mathurin Jacques Brisson in 1760 by tautonomy based on Carl Linnaeus's specific epithet for the European goldfinch Fringilla carduelis. The name carduelis is the Latin word for the European goldfinch.

The polyphyletic nature of the genus was confirmed by Dario Zuccon and coworkers in a comprehensive study of the finch family published in 2012. The authors suggested splitting the genus into several monophyletic clades, a proposal that was accepted by the International Ornithologists' Union. The siskins and goldfinches from the Americas formed a distinct clade and were moved to the resurrected genus Spinus, the greenfinches were moved to the genus Chloris, the twite and linnets formed another clade and were moved to the genus Linaria and finally the redpolls were moved to the genus Acanthis.

The phylogenetic relationships among the Carduelis species are shown below, based on the data by the Cornell Lab of Ornithology.

- Carduelis
  - - Grey-crowned goldfinch, C. caniceps
    - European goldfinch, C. carduelis
  - - Citril finch, C. citrinella
    - Corsican finch, C. corsicana

== Species ==
The genus Carduelis is now restricted to four Western Palaearctic species:

Genus Carduelis – Brisson, 1760 – three species
Common name	Scientific name and subspecies	Range	Size and ecology	IUCN status and estimated population
European goldfinch	Carduelis carduelis (Linnaeus, 1758) Ten subspecies: C. c. balcanica Sachtleben, 1919 – southeastern European; C. c. brevirostris Zarudny, 1890 – Crimea, the northern Caucasus; C. c. britannica (Hartert, 1903) – the British Isles; C. c. carduelis (Linnaeus, 1758) – most of the European mainland, Scandinavia; C. c. colchica Koudashev, 1915 – Crimea and the northern Caucasus; C. c. frigoris Wolters, 1953 – western Siberia; C. c. niediecki Reichenow, 1907 – southwest Asia (Rhodes, Karpathos, Cyprus, Egypt to Asia Minor, North Iraq, Southwest Iran, Northeast Africa; C. c. parva Tschusi, 1901 – the Atlantic Macaronesic islands (the Canary Islands, Madeira), Iberia, northwest Africa; C. c. tschusii Arrigoni degli Oddi, 1902 – Corsica, Sardinia, Sicily; C. c. volgensis Buturlin, 1906 – southern Ukraine, southwestern Russia and northwestern Kazakhstan	Europe, North Africa and western Asia (1 & 2 on map below).	Size: Habitat: Diet:	LC
Grey-crowned goldfinch	Carduelis caniceps Vigors, 1831 Four subspecies: C. c. caniceps Vigors, 1831 – southern central Asia (W Himalayas - Kashmir to Nepal and West Tibet); C. c. paropanisi Kollibay, 1910 – Afghanistan to the western Himalaya and Tien Shan Mountains; C. c. subulata (Gloger, 1833) – south-central Siberia to Lake Baikal and Northwest Mongolia; C. c. ultima Koelz, 1949 – southern Iran	Map of range	Size: Habitat: Diet:	LC
Citril finch	Carduelis citrinella (Pallas, 1764)	Europe from Spain to the Alps	Size: Habitat: Diet:	LC
Corsican finch	Carduelis corsicana (Koenig, 1899)	Corsica and on the Italian islands of Sardinia, Elba, Capraia and Gorgona	Size: Habitat: Diet:	LC
