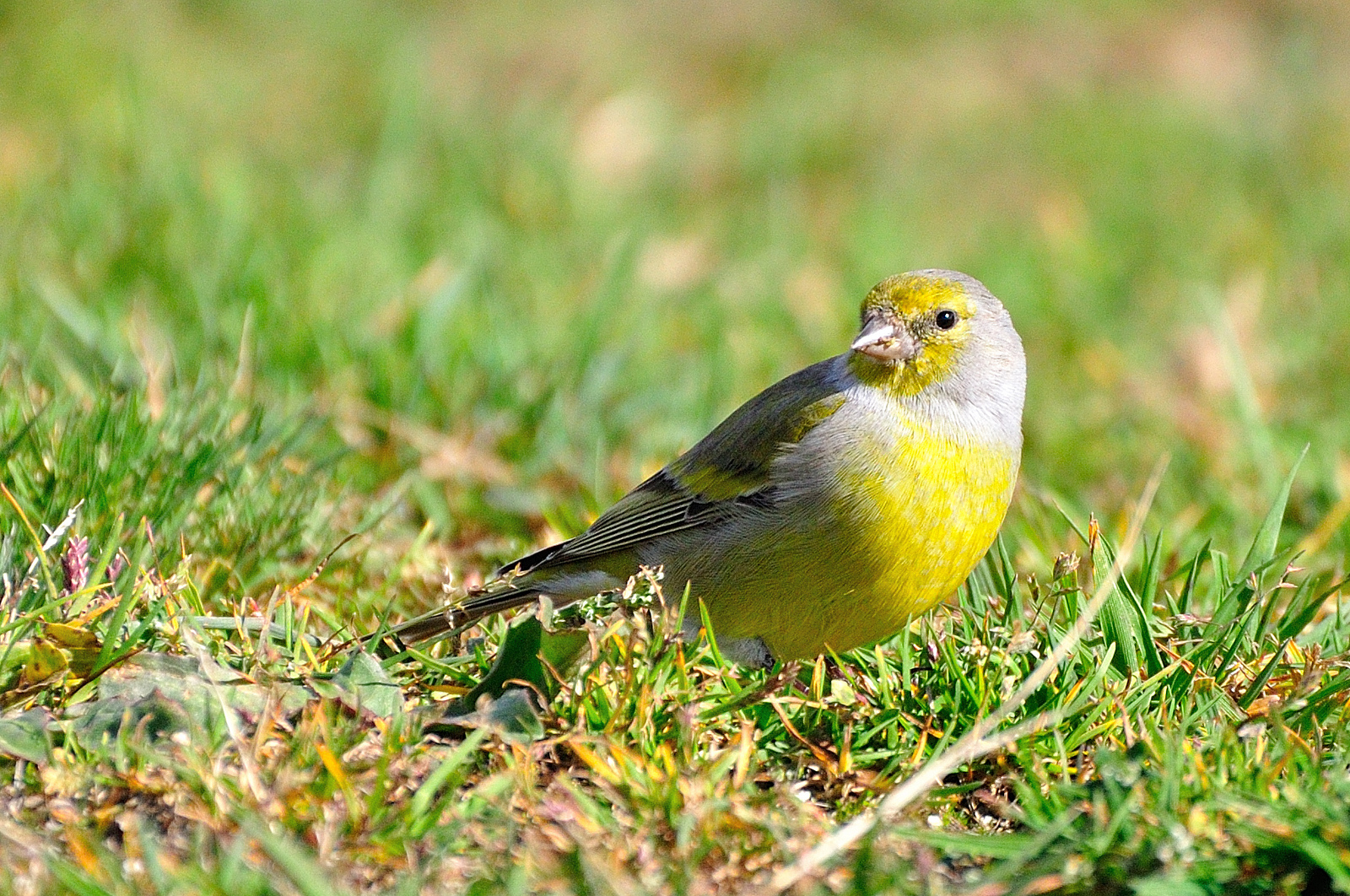

Conservation status
- Least Concern (IUCN 3.1)

Scientific classification
- Kingdom: Animalia
- Phylum: Chordata
- Class: Aves
- Order: Passeriformes
- Family: Fringillidae
- Subfamily: Carduelinae
- Genus: Carduelis
- Species: C. citrinella

Binomial name
- Carduelis citrinella (Pallas, 1764)

Synonyms
- Serinus citrinella (Pallas, 1764); Fringilla citrinella Pallas, 1764

= Citril finch =

Species of bird

The citril finch (Carduelis citrinella), also known as the Alpine citril finch, is a small songbird, a member of the true finch family, Fringillidae.

This bird is a resident breeder in the mountains of southwestern Europe from Spain to the Alps. Its northernmost breeding area is found in the Black Forest of southwestern Germany.

== Taxonomy ==
The citril finch was formally described by the German zoologist Peter Simon Pallas in 1764 under the binomial name Fringilla citrinella. Long considered to be closely related to the European serin and the Cape canary, it was traditionally placed with them in the genus Serinus, until a genetic study in 2007 showed that, despite the plumage differences, it was more closely related to the European goldfinch; a second study in 2012 confirmed this, leading to its formal transfer to the genus Carduelis in 2013.

The Corsican finch (Carduelis corsicana) of Corsica and Sardinia was at one time considered as conspecific with the citril finch, but is now treated as a separate species.

=== Etymology ===
Carduelis is the Latin word for the European goldfinch, and the specific epithet citrinella is the Italian word for a small yellow bird, from a diminutive of the Latin citrinus, citrine or light greenish-yellow.

The phylogenetic relationships among the Carduelis species are shown below, based on the data by the Cornell Lab of Ornithology.

- Carduelis
  - - Grey-crowned goldfinch, C. caniceps
    - European goldfinch, C. carduelis
  - - Citril finch, C. citrinella
    - Corsican finch, C. corsicana

== Description and systematics ==
The citril finch has an overall length of 12 cm (4.7 in) and weighs around 12.5 g (0.44 oz). It is greyish above, with a brown tinge to the back which also has black streaks. The underparts and the double wing bars are yellow. It shares with its relatives a bright face mask which in this species is also yellow.

The sexes are similar, although young females may be duller below, and juvenile birds, unlike in the European Serinus species, are brown, lacking any yellow or green in the plumage.

The song is a silvery twittering resembling that of the European goldfinch (C. carduelis) and that of the European serin (Serinus serinus). The main call is a tee-ee, quite similar to the Eurasian siskin (Spinus spinus).

== Ecology ==
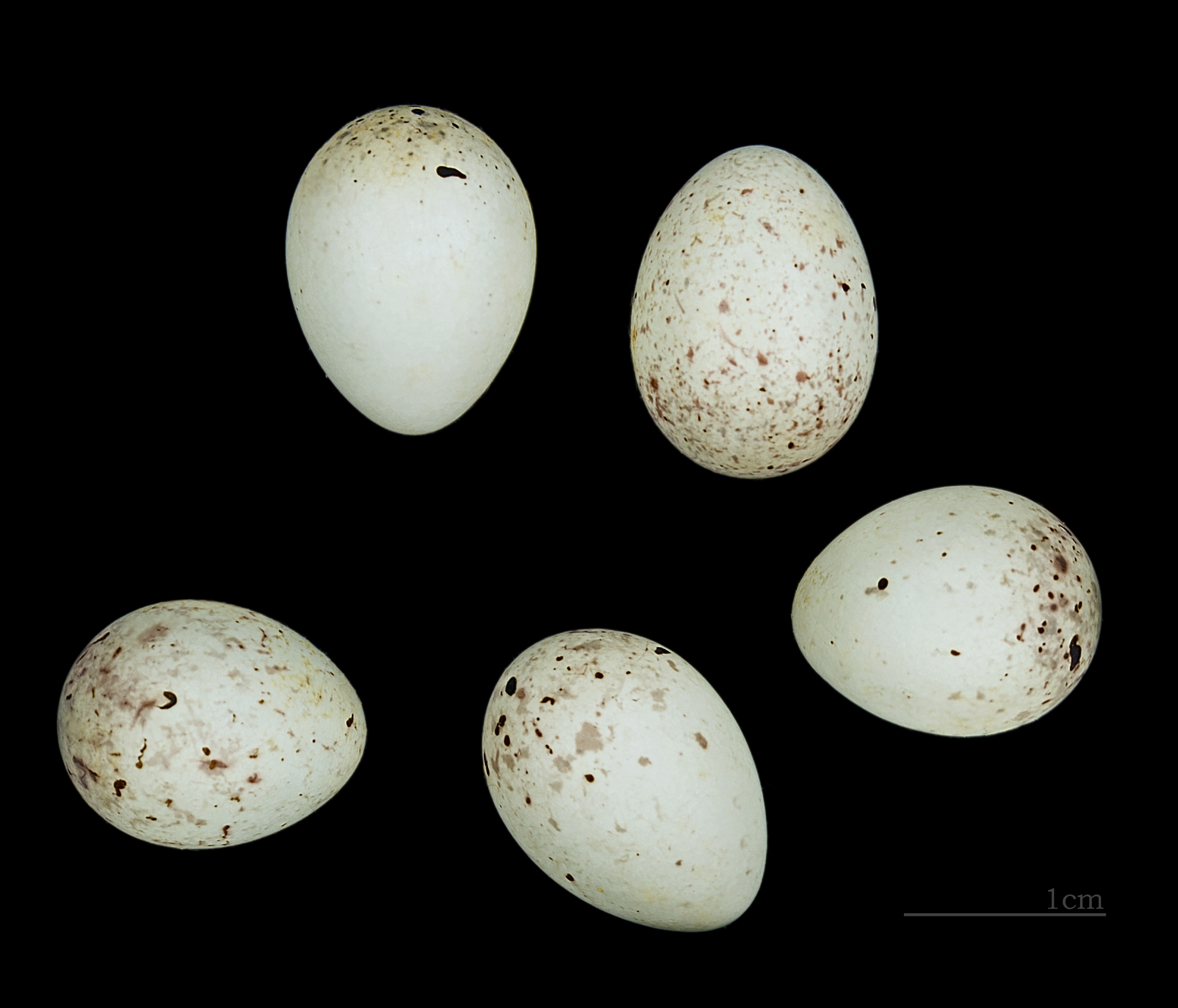
Carduelis citrinella MHNT

The citril finch (Carduelis citrinella) differs from the Corsican finch (C. corsicana) in habitat selection. While the mainland citril finch is rather restricted to subalpine coniferous forests and Alpine meadows, the insular Corsican finch may be found in different habitats from sea level to the highest mountain slopes. The citril finch nests mainly in conifers such as pines (Pinus) and spruces (Picea) while the Corsican finch uses also lower bushes such as tree Heath (Erica arborea), juniper (Juniperus) and bramble (Rubus).

Ranging more widely than its Corsican relative, the citril finch is currently classified as a Species of Least Concern by the IUCN. However, it has only a narrow ecological and climatic tolerance, and is now in severe decline due to global warming and agricultural intensification.

== Sources ==
- Clement, Peter; Harris, Alan & Davis, John (1993): Finches and Sparrows: an identification guide. Christopher Helm, London. ISBN 978-0-691-03424-9
- Cramp, S.; Perrins, C.M., eds. (1994). "Serinus citrinella Citril Finch". The Birds of the Western Palearctic. Vol. 8. Oxford: Oxford University Press. pp. 536–548. ISBN 0-19-854679-3.
- Förschler, Marc Imanuel & Kalko, Elisabeth K.V. (2006a). "Breeding ecology and nest site selection in allopatric mainland Citril Finches Carduelis [citrinella] citrinella and insular Corsican Finches Carduelis [citrinella] corsicanus" (PDF). Journal of Ornithology. 147 (4): 553–564. Bibcode:2006JOrni.147..553F. doi:10.1007/s10336-006-0079-z. S2CID 13188864.
- Förschler, Marc Imanuel & Kalko, Elisabeth K.V. (2006b). "Age-specific reproductive performance in Citril Finches Carduelis [citrinella]". Ardea. 94 (2): 275–279.
- Pasquet, E. & Thibault, J.-C. (1997): Genetic differences among mainland and insular forms of the Citril Finch Serinus citrinella. Ibis 139(4): 679–684. doi:10.1111/j.1474-919X.1997.tb04691.x (HTML abstract)
- Sangster, George (2000): Genetic distance as a test of species boundaries in the Citril Finch Serinus citrinella: a critique and taxonomic reinterpretation. Ibis 142(3): 487–490. doi:10.1111/j.1474-919X.2000.tb04447.x
- Sangster, George; Knox, Alan G.; Helbig, Andreas J. & Parkin, David T. (2002): Taxonomic recommendations for European birds. Ibis 144(1): 153–159. doi:10.1046/j.0019-1019.2001.00026.x
