= List of birds of Corsica =

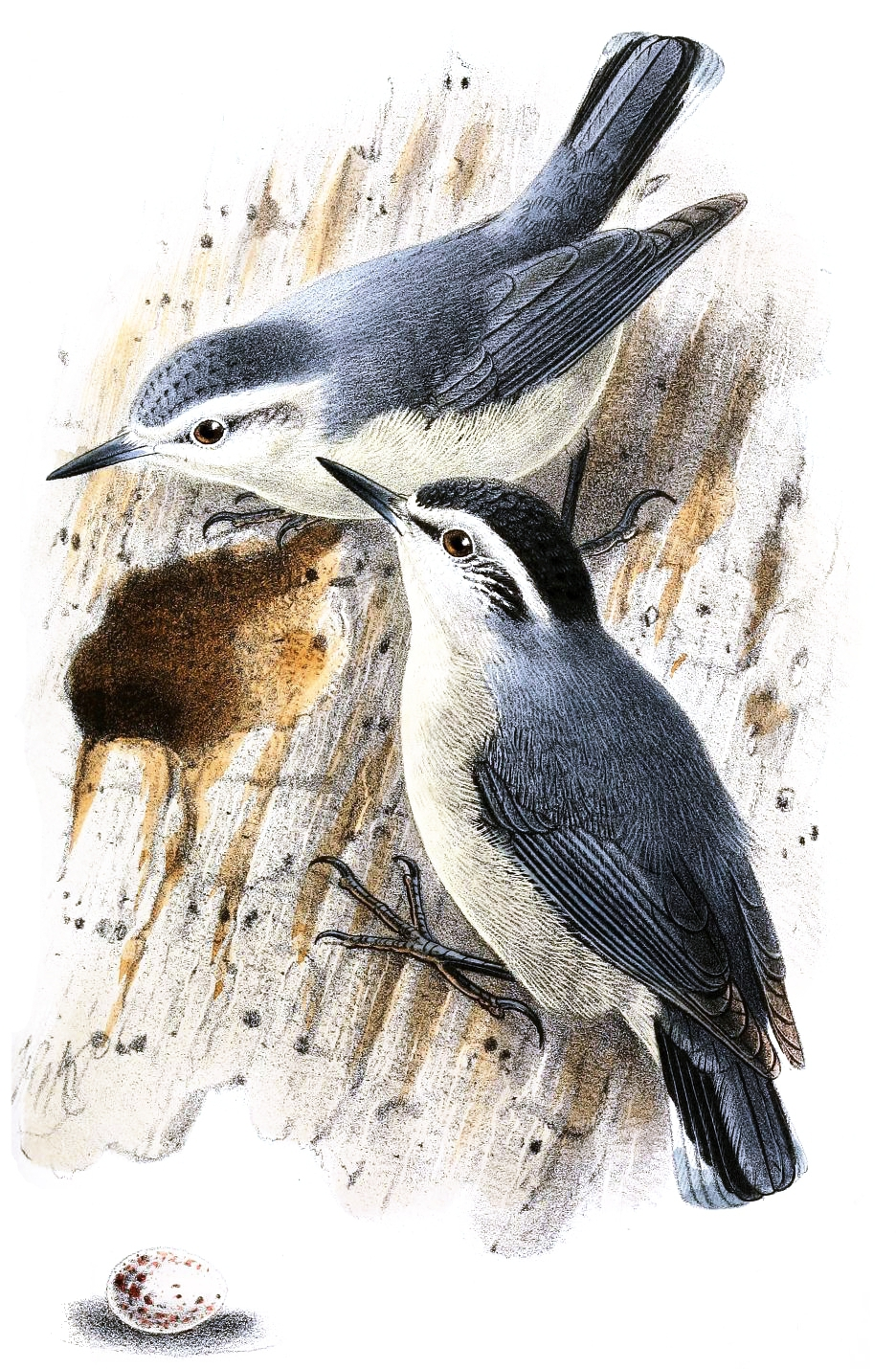
Engraving of Corsican nuthatches from John Whitehead's list of Corsican birds published in 1885

This list of birds of Corsica includes the 367 bird species that have been recorded on Corsica.

Corsica is a French island in the Mediterranean Sea west of the Italian Peninsula, southeast of the French mainland, and north of the Italian island of Sardinia. Mountains make up two-thirds of the island, forming a single chain. The island has an area of 8,722 km^{2} (3,368 sq mi) and measures 183 km (114 mi) in length (north to south) and 83 km (52 mi) east to west.

The status of each species is based on the annotated list by Jean-Claude Thibault and Gilles Bonaccorsi published in 1999 with supplemental additions from Avibase. The family accounts at the beginning of each heading reflect this taxonomy, as do the species counts found in each family account. Accidental species are included in the total species count for Corsica. As with its parent List of birds of Metropolitan France, this list's taxonomic treatment (designation and sequence of orders, families and species) and nomenclature (English and scientific names) are those of the IOC World Bird List, Version 14.2 (2024).

== Ducks, geese, and waterfowl ==
Order: Anseriformes Family: Anatidae

Anatidae includes the ducks and most duck-like waterfowl, such as geese and swans. These birds are adapted to an aquatic existence with webbed feet, flattened bills, and feathers that are excellent at shedding water due to an oily coating.

- Greylag goose - Anser anser - (French: oie cendrée) passage migrant and winter visitor
- Greater white-fronted goose - Anser albifrons - (French: oie rieuse)
- Mute swan - Cygnus olor - (French: cygne tuberculé) accidental visitor
- Black swan - Cygnus atratus - (French: cygne noir) introduced species
- Tundra swan - Cygnus columbianus (French: cygne siffleur) accidental visitor
- Common shelduck - Tadorna tadorna - (French: tadorne de Belon) passage migrant and winter visitor
- Ruddy shelduck - Tadorna ferruginea - (French: tadorne casarca) accidental visitor
- Garganey - Spatula querquedula - (French: sarcelle d'été) passage migrant and occasional breeder
- Blue-winged teal - Spatula discors - (French: sarcelle à ailes bleues) accidental visitor
- Northern shoveler - Spatula clypeata - (French: canard souchet) passage migrant, winter visitor and occasional breeder
- Gadwall - Mareca strepera - (French: canard chipeau) passage migrant and winter visitor
- Eurasian wigeon - Mareca penelope - (French: canard siffleur) passage migrant and winter visitor
- Mallard - Anas platyrhynchos - (French: canard colvert) resident breeder
- Northern pintail - Anas acuta - (French: canard pilet) passage migrant and winter visitor
- Eurasian teal - Anas crecca - (French: sarcelle d'hiver) passage migrant and winter visitor
- Marbled duck - Marmaronetta angustirostris - (French: sarcelle marbrée) accidental visitor
- Red-crested pochard - Netta rufina - (French: nette rousse) resident breeder and passage migrant
- Common pochard - Aythya ferina - (French: fuligule milouin) winter visitor and passage migrant
- Ferruginous duck - Aythya nyroca - (French: fuligule nyroca) passage migrant and occasional breeder
- Tufted duck - Aythya fuligula - (French: fuligule morillon) winter visitor and passage migrant
- Greater scaup - Aythya marila - (French: fuligule milouinan) accidental visitor
- Common eider - Somateria mollissima - (French: eider à duvet) accidental visitor
- Velvet scoter - Melanitta fusca - (French: macreuse brune) accidental visitor
- Common scoter - Melanitta nigra - (French: macreuse noire) accidental visitor
- Long-tailed duck - Clangula hyemalis - (French: harelde kakawi) accidental visitor
- Common goldeneye - Bucephala clangula - (French: garrot à oeil d'or) accidental visitor
- Smew - Mergellus albellus - (French: harle piette) accidental visitor
- Goosander - Mergus merganser - (French: harle bièvre) accidental visitor
- Red-breasted merganser - Mergus serrator - (French: harle huppé) winter visitor and passage migrant
- Ruddy duck - Oxyura jamaicensis - (French: érismature rousse) introduced species
- White-headed duck - Oxyura leucocephala - (French: érismature à tête blanche) former breeder, extirpated

== Pheasants, grouse, and allies ==
Order: Galliformes Family: Phasianidae

These are terrestrial species of gamebirds, feeding and nesting on the ground. They are variable in size but generally plump, with broad and relatively short wings.

- Common pheasant - Phasianus colchicus - (French: faisan de Colchide) introduced breeder
- Common quail - Coturnix coturnix - (French: caille des blés) breeding visitor and passage migrant
- Red-legged partridge - Alectoris rufa - (French: perdrix rouge) introduced breeder

== Nightjars and allies ==
Order: Caprimulgiformes Family: Caprimulgidae

Nightjars are medium-sized nocturnal birds that usually nest on the ground. They have long wings, short legs and very short bills. Most have small feet, of little use for walking, and long pointed wings. Their soft plumage is camouflaged to resemble bark or leaves.

- European nightjar - Caprimulgus europaeus - (French: engoulevent d'Europe) passage migrant

== Swifts ==
Order: Caprimulgiformes Family: Apodidae

Swifts are small birds which spend the majority of their lives flying. These birds have very short legs and never settle voluntarily on the ground, perching instead only on vertical surfaces. Many swifts have long swept-back wings which resemble a crescent or boomerang.

- Alpine swift - Apus melba - (French: martinet à ventre blanc) breeding visitor and passage migrant
- Common swift - Apus apus - (French: martinet noir) breeding visitor and passage migrant
- Pallid swift - Apus pallidus - (French: martinet pâle) breeding visitor and passage migrant
- Little swift - Apus affinis - (French: martinet des maisons) accidental visitor

== Bustards ==
Order: Otidiformes Family: Otididae

Bustards are large terrestrial birds mainly associated with dry open country and steppes in the Old World. They are omnivorous and nest on the ground. They walk steadily on strong legs and big toes, pecking for food as they go. They have long broad wings with "fingered" wingtips and striking patterns in flight. Many have interesting mating displays.

- Little bustard - Tetrax tetrax - (French: outarde canepetière) accidental visitor

== Cuckoos ==
Order: Cuculiformes Family: Cuculidae

The family Cuculidae includes cuckoos, roadrunners and anis. These birds are of variable size with slender bodies, long tails and strong legs. The Old World cuckoos are brood parasites.

- Great spotted cuckoo - Clamator glandarius - (French: coucou geai) passage migrant
- Common cuckoo - Cuculus canorus - (French: coucou gris) passage migrant and breeding visitor

== Pigeons and doves ==
Order: Columbiformes Family: Columbidae

Pigeons and doves are stout-bodied birds with short necks and short slender bills with a fleshy cere.

- Rock dove - Columba livia - (French: pigeon biset) resident breeder
- Stock dove - Columba oenas - (French: pigeon colombin) passage migrant and winter visitor
- Common wood pigeon - Columba palumbus - (French: pigeon ramier) passage migrant, winter visitor and resident breeder
- European turtle dove - Streptopelia turtur - (French: tourterelle des bois) passage migrant and breeding visitor
- Eurasian collared dove - Streptopelia decaocto - (French: tourterelle turque) resident breeder

== Rails, moorhens, and coots ==
Order: Gruiformes Family: Rallidae

Rallidae is a large family of small to medium-sized birds which includes the rails, crakes, coots, and moorhens. Typically they inhabit dense vegetation in damp environments near lakes, swamps, or rivers. Many are shy and secretive birds, but some are bold and conspicuous. Most species have strong legs and long toes which are well adapted to soft uneven surfaces. They tend to have short, rounded wings and appear to be to be weak fliers, though many are capable of long-distance migration.

- Water rail - Rallus aquaticus - (French: râle d'eau) resident breeder, passage migrant and winter visitor
- Corn crake - Crex crex - (French: râle des genêts) accidental visitor
- Spotted crake - Porzana porzana - (French: marouette ponctuée) passage migrant
- Common moorhen - Gallinula chloropus - (French: poule d'eau) resident breeder, passage migrant and winter visitor
- Eurasian coot - Fulica atra - (French: foulque macroule) winter visitor, resident breeder and passage migrant
- Western swamphen - Porphyrio porphyrio - (French: talève sultane) accidental visitor
- Baillon's crake - Zapornia pusilla - (French: marouette de Baillon) accidental visitor
- Little crake - Zapornia parva - (French: marouette poussin) passage migrant

== Cranes ==
Order: Gruiformes Family: Gruidae

Cranes are large, long-legged and long-necked birds. Unlike the similar-looking but unrelated herons, cranes fly with necks outstretched, not pulled back. Most have elaborate and noisy courting displays or "dances".

- Common crane - Grus grus - (French: grue cendrée) passage migrant and winter visitor

== Grebes ==
Order: Podicipediformes Family: Podicipedidae

Grebes are small to medium-large freshwater diving birds. They have lobed toes and are excellent swimmers and divers. However, they have their feet placed far back on the body, making them quite ungainly on land.

- Little grebe - Tachybaptus ruficollis - (French: grèbe castagneux) resident breeder and winter visitor
- Red-necked grebe - Podiceps grisegena - (French: grèbe jougris) passage migrant and winter visitor
- Great crested grebe - Podiceps cristatus - (French: grèbe huppé) resident breeder, passage migrant and winter visitor
- Slavonian grebe - Podiceps auritus - (French: grèbe esclavon) accidental visitor
- Black-necked grebe - Podiceps nigricollis - (French: grèbe à cou noir) passage migrant, winter visitor and occasional breeder

== Flamingos ==
Order: Phoenicopteriformes Family: Phoenicopteridae

Flamingos are gregarious warm temperate to tropical wetland birds, usually 1 to 1.5 metres (3 ft 3 in to 4 ft 11 in) high, found in both the Western and Eastern Hemispheres. Flamingos filter-feed on shrimps and algae. Their oddly shaped beaks are specially adapted to separate mud and silt from the food they consume and, uniquely, are used upside-down.

- Greater flamingo - Phoenicopterus roseus - (French: flamant rose) passage migrant and winter visitor

== Stone-curlews ==
Order: Charadriiformes Family: Burhinidae

The stone-curlews, also called thick-knees, are a group of waders found worldwide within the tropical zone, with some species also breeding in temperate Europe and Australia. They are medium to large waders with strong black or yellow-black bills, large yellow eyes, and cryptic plumage. Despite being classed as waders, most species have a preference for arid or semi-arid habitats.

- Eurasian stone-curlew - Burhinus oedicnemus - (French: œdicnème criard) passage migrant and winter visitor

== Oystercatchers ==
Order: Charadriiformes Family: Haematopodidae

The oystercatchers are large and noisy plover-like birds, with strong bills used for smashing or prising open molluscs.

- Eurasian oystercatcher - Haematopus ostralegus - (French: huîtrier pie) passage migrant

== Stilts and avocets ==
Order: Charadriiformes Family: Recurvirostridae

Recurvirostridae is a family of large wading birds, which includes the avocets and stilts. The avocets have long legs and long up-curved bills. The stilts have extremely long legs and long, thin, straight bills.

- Black-winged stilt - Himantopus himantopus - (French: échasse blanche) passage migrant and occasional breeder
- Pied avocet - Recurvirostra avosetta - (French: avocette élégante) passage migrant and winter visitor

== Plovers and lapwings ==
Order: Charadriiformes Family: Charadriidae

The family Charadriidae includes the plovers, dotterel, and lapwings. They are small to medium-sized birds with compact bodies, short thick necks, and long, usually pointed, wings. They are found in open country worldwide, mostly in habitats near water.

- Grey plover - Pluvialis squatarola - (French: pluvier argenté) passage migrant
- European golden plover - Pluvialis apricaria - (French: pluvier doré) passage migrant and winter visitor
- Eurasian dotterel - Charadrius morinellus - (French: pluvier guignard) accidental visitor
- Common ringed plover - Charadrius hiaticula - (French: pluvier grand-gravelot) passage migrant
- Little ringed plover - Charadrius dubius - (French: pluvier petit-gravelot) breeding visitor and passage migrant
- Northern lapwing - Vanellus vanellus - (French: vanneau huppé) passage migrant and winter visitor
- Kentish plover - Charadrius alexandrinus - (French: pluvier à collier interrompu) passage migrant, winter visitor and occasional breeder

== Sandpipers and allies ==
Order: Charadriiformes Family: Scolopacidae

Scolopacidae is a large diverse family of small to medium-sized waders including the sandpipers, curlews, godwits, shanks, woodcock, snipe, dowitchers, and phalaropes. The majority of these species eat small invertebrates picked out of the mud or soil. Variation in length of legs and bills enables multiple species to feed in the same habitat, particularly on the coast, without direct competition for food.

- Eurasian whimbrel - Numenius phaeopus - (French: courlis corlieu) passage migrant
- Eurasian curlew - Numenius arquata - (French: courlis cendré) passage migrant and winter visitor
- Bar-tailed godwit - Limosa lapponica - (French: barge rousse) passage migrant
- Black-tailed godwit - Limosa limosa - (French: barge à queue noire) passage migrant
- Jack snipe - Lymnocryptes minimus - (French: bécassine sourde) passage migrant and winter visitor
- Eurasian woodcock - Scolopax rusticola - (French: bécasse des bois) passage migrant, winter visitor and occasional breeder
- Great snipe - Gallinago media - (French: bécassine double) passage migrant
- Common snipe - Gallinago gallinago - (French: bécassine des marais) passage migrant and winter visitor
- Wilson's phalarope - Phalaropus tricolor - (French: phalarope de Wilson) accidental visitor
- Terek sandpiper - Xenus cinereus - (French: chevalier bargette) accidental visitor
- Common sandpiper - Actitis hypoleucos - (French: chevalier guignette) passage migrant, winter visitor and occasional breeder
- Green sandpiper - Tringa ochropus - (French: chevalier cul-blanc) passage migrant
- Marsh sandpiper - Tringa stagnatilis - (French: chevalier stagnatile) passage migrant
- Wood sandpiper - Tringa glareola - (French: chevalier sylvain) passage migrant
- Common redshank - Tringa totanus - (French: chevalier gambette) passage migrant
- Spotted redshank - Tringa erythropus - (French: chevalier arlequin) passage migrant
- Common greenshank - Tringa nebularia - (French: chevalier aboyeur) passage migrant
- Ruddy turnstone - Arenaria interpres - (French: tournepierre à collier) passage migrant
- Red knot - Calidris canutus - (French: bécasseau maubèche) passage migrant
- Ruff - Calidris pugnax - (French: combattant varié) passage migrant
- Broad-billed sandpiper - Calidris falcinellus - (French: bécasseau falcinelle) accidental visitor
- Curlew sandpiper - Calidris ferruginea - (French: bécasseau cocorli) passage migrant
- Temminck's stint - Calidris temminckii - (French: bécasseau de Temminck) passage migrant
- Sanderling - Calidris alba - (French: bécasseau sanderling) passage migrant
- Dunlin - Calidris alpina - (French: bécasseau variable) passage migrant
- Little stint - Calidris minuta - (French: bécasseau minute) passage migrant
- Least sandpiper - Calidris minutilla - (French: bécasseau minuscule) accidental visitor

== Pratincoles and coursers ==
Order: Charadriiformes Family: Glareolidae

Glareolidae is a family of wading birds comprising the pratincoles, which have short legs, long pointed wings, and long forked tails, and the coursers, which have long legs, short wings, and pointed bills which curve downwards.

- Cream-coloured courser - Cursorius cursor - (French: courvite isabelle) accidental visitor
- Collared pratincole - Glareola pratincola - (French: glaréole à collier) passage migrant

== Gulls and terns ==
Order: Charadriiformes Family: Laridae

Laridae is a family of medium to large seabirds and includes gulls and terns. Gulls are typically grey and white, often with black markings on the head and wingtips. They have stout, longish, bills and webbed feet. Terns are a group of generally small to medium seabirds typically with grey and white plumage, often with black cap on the head, but more extensive black in some species. Most terns hunt fish by diving but some pick insects off the surface of fresh water. Gulls and terns are generally long-lived birds, with several species known to live in excess of 30 years.

- Little tern - Sternula albifrons - (French: sterne naine) passage migrant
- Gull-billed tern - Gelochelidon nilotica - (French: sterne hansel) passage migrant
- Caspian tern - Hydroprogne caspia - (French: sterne caspienne) passage migrant and former breeder
- Whiskered tern - Chlidonias hybrida - (French: guifette moustac) passage migrant
- Black tern - Chlidonias niger - (French: guifette noire) passage migrant
- White-winged tern - Chlidonias leucopterus - (French: guifette leucoptère) passage migrant
- Arctic tern - Sterna paradisaea - (French: sterne arctique)
- Common tern - Sterna hirundo - (French: sterne pierregarin) passage migrant and occasional breeder
- Sandwich tern - Thalasseus sandvicensis - (French: sterne caugek) passage migrant and winter visitor
- Lesser crested tern - Thalasseus bengalensis - (French: sterne voyageuse) accidental visitor
- Little gull - Hydrocoloeus minutus - (French: mouette pygmée) passage migrant and winter visitor
- Black-legged kittiwake - Rissa tridactyla - (French: mouette tridactyle) passage migrant and winter visitor
- Sabine's gull - Xema sabini - (French: mouette de Sabine) accidental visitor
- Slender-billed gull - Chroicocephalus genei - (French: goéland railleur) passage migrant
- Black-headed gull - Chroicocephalus ridibundus - (French: mouette rieuse) winter visitor and passage migrant
- Pallas's gull - Ichthyaetus ichthyaetus - (French: goéland ichthyaète) accidental visitor
- Audouin's gull - Ichthyaetus audouinii - (French: goéland d'Audouin) resident breeder and passage migrant
- Mediterranean gull - Ichthyaetus melanocephalus - (French: mouette mélanocéphale) passage migrant and winter visitor
- Common gull - Larus canus - (French: goéland cendré) passage migrant and winter visitor
- Caspian gull - Larus cachinnans - (French: goéland pontique)
- European herring gull - Larus argentatus - (French: goéland argenté)
- Yellow-legged gull - Larus michahellis - (French: goéland leucophée) resident breeder
- Lesser black-backed gull - Larus fuscus - (French: goéland brun) passage migrant and winter visitor

== Skuas ==
Order: Charadriiformes Family: Stercorariidae

The family Stercorariidae are, in general, medium to large sea birds, typically with grey or brown plumage, often with white markings on the wings. They nest on the ground in temperate and arctic regions and are long-distance migrants.

- Great skua - Stercorarius skua - (French: grand Labbe) passage migrant
- Pomarine skua - Stercorarius pomarinus - (French: labbe pomarin) accidental visitor
- Arctic skua - Stercorarius parasiticus - (French: labbe parasite) accidental visitor
- Long-tailed skua - Stercorarius longicaudus - (French: labbe à longue queue) accidental visitor

== Auks, guillemot, and puffins ==
Order: Charadriiformes Family: Alcidae

A family of seabirds which are superficially similar to penguins with their black-and-white colours, their upright posture and some of their habits but which are able to fly.

- Little auk - Alle alle - (French: mergule nain) accidental visitor
- Razorbill - Alca torda - (French: petit pingouin) passage migrant
- Atlantic puffin - Fratercula arctica - (French: macareux moine) passage migrant and winter visitor

== Divers or loons ==
Order: Gaviiformes Family: Gaviidae

Divers are a group of aquatic birds found in northern parts of North America and Eurasia. They are around the size of a cormorant, which they somewhat resemble in shape when swimming, but to which they are completely unrelated. In particular, their legs are set very far back which assists swimming underwater but makes walking on land extremely difficult.

- Red-throated diver - Gavia stellata - (French: plongeon catmarin) accidental visitor
- Black-throated diver - Gavia arctica - (French: plongeon arctique) winter visitor

== Albatrosses ==
Order: Procellariiformes Family: Diomedeidae

The albatrosses are among the largest flying birds, with long, narrow wings for gliding. The majority are found in the Southern Hemisphere with only vagrants occurring in the North Atlantic.

- Black-browed albatross - Thalassarche melanophris - (French: albatros à sourcils noirs) accidental visitor

== Northern storm petrels ==
Order: Procellariiformes Family: Hydrobatidae

The family Hydrobatidae is the northern storm petrels, small pelagic petrels with a fluttering flight which often follow ships.

- European storm petrel - Hydrobates pelagicus - (French: océanite tempête) breeding visitor

== Shearwaters and petrels ==
Order: Procellariiformes Family: Procellariidae

The procellariids are the main group of medium-sized "true petrels", characterised by united nostrils with medium septum and a long outer functional primary.

- Scopoli's shearwater - Calonectis diomedea - (French: puffin cendré) breeding visitor and passage migrant
- Manx shearwater - Puffinus puffinus - (French: puffin des Anglais)
- Yelkouan shearwater - Puffinus yelkouan - (French: puffin yelkouan) winter visitor, passage migrant and occasional breeder
- Balearic shearwater - Puffinus mauretanicus - (French: puffin des Baléares)
- Barolo shearwater - Puffinus baroli - accidental visitor - (French: puffin de Macaronésie)
- Bulwer's petrel - Bulweria bulwerii - (French: pétrel de Bulwer) accidental visitor

== Storks ==
Order: Ciconiiformes Family: Ciconiidae

Storks are large, long-legged, long-necked wetland birds with long, stout bills. Storks are mute, but bill-clattering is an important mode of communication at the nest. Their nests can be large and may be reused for many years. Many species are migratory.

- Black stork - Ciconia nigra - (French: cigogne noire) passage migrant
- White stork - Ciconia ciconia - (French: cigogne blanche) passage migrant and winter visitor

== Boobies and gannets ==
Order: Suliformes Family: Sulidae

The sulids comprise the gannets and boobies. Both groups are medium to large coastal seabirds that plunge-dive for fish.

- Northern gannet - Morus bassanus - (French: fou de Bassan) winter visitor and passage migrant

== Cormorants and shags ==
Order: Suliformes Family: Phalacrocoracidae

Phalacrocoracidae is a family of medium-to-large fish-eating seabirds that includes cormorants and shags. Plumage colouration varies, with the majority having mainly dark plumage.

- Pygmy cormorant - Microcarbo pygmaeus - (French: cormoran pygmée) accidental visitor
- Great cormorant - Phalacrocorax carbo - (French: grand cormoran) winter visitor and passage migrant
- European shag - Gulosus aristotelis - (French: cormoran huppé) resident breeder

== Ibises and spoonbills ==
Order: Pelecaniformes Family: Threskiornithidae

Threskiornithidae is a family of large terrestrial and wading birds which includes the ibises and spoonbills. They have long, broad wings with 11 primary and about 20 secondary feathers. They are strong fliers and, despite their size and weight, very capable soarers.

- Northern bald ibis - Geronticus eremita - (French: ibis chauve) introduced species
- Glossy ibis - Plegadis falcinellus - (French: ibis falcinelle) passage migrant
- Eurasian spoonbill - Platalea leucorodia - (French: spatule blanche) passage migrant

== Herons, egrets, and bitterns ==
Order: Pelecaniformes Family: Ardeidae

The family Ardeidae contains bitterns, herons and egrets. Herons and egrets are medium to large wading birds with long necks and legs. Bitterns tend to be shorter necked and more wary. Members of Ardeidae fly with their necks retracted, unlike other long-necked birds such as storks, ibises and spoonbills.

- Great bittern - Botaurus stellata - (French: butor étoilé) passage migrant and winter visitor
- Little bittern - Ixobrychus minutus - (French: blongios nain) breeding visitor and passage migrant
- Black-crowned night heron - Nycticorax nycticorax - (French: bihoreau gris) passage migrant
- Little egret - Egretta garzetta - (French: aigrette garzette) passage migrant, winter visitor and occasional breeder
- Western reef heron - Egretta gularis - (French: aigrette à gorge blanche) accidental visitor
- Squacco heron - Ardeola ralloides - (French: héron crabier) passage migrant
- Western cattle egret - Bubulcus ibis - (French: héron garde-boeufs) winter visitor, passage migrant and occasional breeder
- Great egret - Ardea alba - (French: grande aigrette) winter visitor
- Grey heron - Ardea cinerea - (French: héron cendré) winter visitor
- Purple heron - Ardea purpurea - (French: héron pourpré) breeding visitor

== Pelicans ==
Order: Pelecaniformes Family: Pelecanidae

The Pelecanidae are a family of large water birds. They have a long beak and a large throat pouch used for catching prey.

- Great white pelican - Pelecanus onocrotalus - (French: pélican blanc) accidental visitor

== Osprey ==
Order: Accipitriformes Family: Pandionidae

The family Pandionidae contains only one species, the osprey. The osprey is a medium-large raptor which is a specialist fish-eater with a worldwide distribution.

- Osprey - Pandion haliaetus - (French: balbuzard pêcheur) resident breeder and winter visitor

== Hawks, eagles, and kites ==
Order: Accipitriformes Family: Accipitridae

Accipitridae is a family of birds of prey, which includes hawks, eagles, kites, harriers and Old World vultures. They have powerful hooked beaks for tearing flesh from their prey, strong legs, powerful talons and keen eyesight.

- Bearded vulture - Gypaetus barbatus - (French: gypaète barbu) resident breeder
- European honey buzzard - Pernis apivorus - (French: bondrée apivore) passage migrant
- Griffon vulture - Gyps fulvus - (French: vautour fauve) accidental visitor
- Eurasian black vulture - Aegypius monachus - (French: vautour moine)
- Short-toed snake eagle - Circaetus gallicus - (French: circaète Jean-le-Blanc) passage migrant
- Lesser spotted eagle - Clanga pomarina - (French: aigle pomarin) accidental visitor
- Booted eagle - Hieraaetus pennatus - (French: aigle botté) accidental visitor
- Eastern imperial eagle - Aquila heliaca - (French: aigle impérial) accidental visitor
- Golden eagle - Aquila chrysaetos - (French: aigle royal) resident breeder
- Bonelli's eagle - Aquila fasciata - (French: aigle de Bonelli) passage migrant
- Eurasian sparrowhawk - Accipiter nisus - (French: épervier d'Europe) resident breeder
- Eurasian goshawk - Accipiter gentilis - (French: autour des palombes) resident breeder
- Western marsh harrier - Circus aeruginosus - (French: busard des roseaux) passage migrant and resident breeder
- Hen harrier - Circus cyaneus - (French: busard Saint-Martin) passage migrant and winter visitor
- Pallid harrier - Circus macrourus - (French: busard pâle) accidental visitor
- Montagu's harrier - Circus pygargus - (French: busard cendré) passage migrant and occasional breeder
- Red kite - Milvus milvus - (French: milan royal) resident breeder and passage migrant
- Black kite - Milvus migrans - (French: milan noir) passage migrant and rare breeder
- White-tailed eagle - Haliaeetus albicilla - (French: pygargue à queue blanche) former breeder
- Long-legged buzzard - Buteo rufinus - (French: buse féroce) accidental visitor
- Common buzzard - Buteo buteo - (French: buse variable) resident breeder and passage migrant

== Barn owls ==
Order: Strigiformes Family: Tytonidae

Barn-owls are medium to large owls with large heads and characteristic heart-shaped faces. They have long strong legs with powerful talons.

- Western barn owl - Tyto alba - (French: chouette effraie) resident breeder

== Owls ==
Order: Strigiformes Family: Strigidae

Typical owls are small to large solitary nocturnal birds of prey. They have large forward-facing eyes and ears, a hawk-like beak and a conspicuous circle of feathers around each eye called a facial disc.

- Little owl - Athene noctua - (French: chevêche d'Athéna) occasional breeder?
- Eurasian pygmy owl - Glaucidium passerinum - (French: chevêchette d'Europe)
- Eurasian scops owl - Otus scops - (French: petit-duc scops) resident breeder and passage migrant
- Long-eared owl - Asio otus - (French: hibou moyen-duc) passage migrant, winter visitor and occasional breeder
- Short-eared owl - Asio flammeus - (French: hibou des marais) passage migrant and winter visitor
- Eurasian eagle-owl - Bubo bubo - (French: hibou grand-duc) accidental visitor

== Hoopoes ==
Order: Bucerotiformes Family: Upupidae

Hoopoes have black and white wings and orangey-pink body plumage, with a large erectile crest on their head.

- Eurasian hoopoe - Upupa epops - (French: huppe fasciée) breeding visitor, passage migrant and winter visitor

== Rollers ==
Order: Coraciiformes Family: Coraciidae

Rollers resemble crows in size and build, but are more closely related to the kingfishers and bee-eaters. They share the colourful appearance of those groups with blues and browns predominating. The two inner front toes are connected, but the outer toe is not. There are 13 species worldwide; one species occurs in Corsica.

- European roller - Coracias garrulus - (French: rollier d'Europe) passage migrant and possibly occasional breeder

== Kingfishers ==
Order: Coraciiformes Family: Alcedinidae

Kingfishers are medium-sized birds with large heads, long, pointed bills, short legs and stubby tails.

- Common kingfisher - Alcedo atthis - (French: martin-pêcheur d'Europe) passage migrant, winter visitor and resident breeder

== Bee-eaters ==
Order: Coraciiformes Family: Meropidae

The bee-eaters are a group of birds in the family Meropidae. Most species are found in Africa but others occur in southern Europe, Madagascar, Australia and New Guinea. They are characterised by richly coloured plumage, slender bodies and usually elongated central tail feathers. All are colourful and have long downturned bills and pointed wings, which give them a swallow-like appearance when seen from afar.

- Blue-cheeked bee-eater - Merops persicus - (French: guêpier de Perse) accidental visitor
- European bee-eater - Merops apiaster - (French: guêpier d'Europe) breeding visitor and passage migrant

== Woodpeckers ==
Order: Piciformes Family: Picidae

Woodpeckers are small to medium-sized birds with chisel-like beaks, short legs, stiff tails, and long tongues used for capturing insects. Some species have feet with two toes pointing forward and two backward, while several species have only three toes. Many woodpeckers have the habit of tapping noisily on tree trunks with their beaks.

- Eurasian wryneck - Jynx torquilla - (French: torcol fourmilier) resident breeder and passage migrant
- Eurasian three-toed woodpecker - Picoides tridactylus - (French: pic tridactyle)
- Middle spotted woodpecker - Dendrocoptes medius - (French: pic mar)
- Lesser spotted woodpecker - Dryobates minor - (French: pic épeichette) accidental visitor
- Great spotted woodpecker - Dendrocopos major - (French: pic épeiche) resident breeder
- White-backed woodpecker - Dendrocopos leucotos - (French: pic à dos blanc)
- Black woodpecker - Dryocopus martius - (French: pic noir) accidental visitor
- European green woodpecker - Picus viridis - (French: pic vert) accidental visitor

== Falcons and caracaras ==
Order: Falconiformes Family: Falconidae

Falconidae is a family of diurnal birds of prey. They differ from hawks, eagles and kites in that they kill with their beaks instead of their talons.

- Lesser kestrel - Falco naumanni - (French: faucon crécerellette) passage migrant and occasional breeder
- Common kestrel - Falco tinnunculus - (French: faucon crécerelle) resident breeder and passage migrant
- Red-footed falcon - Falco vespertinus - (French: faucon kobez) passage migrant
- Eleonora's falcon - Falco eleonorae - (French: faucon d'Eléonore) passage migrant
- Merlin - Falco columbarius - (French: faucon émerillon) passage migrant
- Eurasian hobby - Falco subbuteo - (French: faucon hobereau) breeding visitor and passage migrant
- Lanner falcon - Falco biarmicus - (French: faucon lanier) accidental visitor
- Saker falcon - Falco cherrug - (French: faucon sacre) accidental visitor
- Peregrine falcon - Falco peregrinus - (French: faucon pèlerin) resident breeder

== Old World orioles ==
Order: Passeriformes Family: Oriolidae

The Old World orioles are colourful passerine birds. They are not related to the New World orioles.

- Eurasian golden oriole - Oriolus oriolus - (French: loriot d'Europe) passage migrant and breeding visitor

== Shrikes ==
Order: Passeriformes Family: Laniidae

Shrikes are passerine birds known for their habit of catching other birds and small animals and impaling the uneaten portions of their bodies on thorns. A typical shrike's beak is hooked, like a bird of prey.

- Great grey shrike - Lanius excubitor - (French: pie-grièche grise) accidental visitor
- Lesser grey shrike - Lanius minor - (French: pie-grièche à poitrine rose) passage migrant
- Woodchat shrike - Lanius senator - (French: pie-grièche à tête rousse) breeding visitor and passage migrant
- Isabelline shrike - Lanius isabellinus - (French: pie-grièche isabelle) accidental visitor
- Red-backed shrike - Lanius collurio - (French: pie-grièche écorcheur) breeding visitor and passage migrant

== Crows, jays, and magpies ==
Order: Passeriformes Family: Corvidae

The family Corvidae includes crows, ravens, jays, choughs, magpies, and nutcrackers. Corvids are larger than the average size for species in the order Passeriformes and some show high levels of intelligence and exceptional spatial memory.

- Eurasian jay - Garrulus glandarius - (French: geai des chênes) resident breeder
- Eurasian magpie - Pica pica - (French: pie bavarde) occasional breeder and passage migrant
- Eurasian nutcracker - Nucifraga caryocatactes - (French: cassenoix moucheté) accidental visitor
- Red-billed chough - Pyrrhocorax pyrrhocorax - (French: crave à bec rouge) accidental visitor
- Alpine chough - Pyrrhocorax graculus - (French: chocard à bec jaune) resident breeder
- Western jackdaw - Corvus monedula - (French: choucas des tours) passage migrant and occasional breeder
- Rook - Corvus frugilegus - (French: corbeau freux) accidental visitor but formerly winter visitor
- Carrion crow - Corvus corone - (French: corneille noire) accidental visitor
- Hooded crow - Corvus cornix - (French: corneille mantelée) resident breeder and perhaps passage migrant
- Common raven - Corvus corax - (French: grand corbeau) resident breeder and perhaps passage migrant

== Waxwings ==
Order: Passeriformes Family: Bombycillidae

The waxwings are a group of birds with soft silky plumage and unique red tips to some of the wing feathers. These tips look like sealing wax and give the group its name. These are arboreal birds of northern forests. They live on insects in summer and berries in winter.

- Bohemian waxwing - Bombycilla garrulus - (French: jaseur boréal) accidental visitor

== Tits ==
Order: Passeriformes Family: Paridae

The tits are mainly small stocky woodland species with short but strong bills. Some have crests. They are adaptable birds, with a mixed diet including seeds and insects.

- Coal tit - Periparus ater - (French: mésange noire) resident breeder and perhaps passage migrant
- Crested tit - Lophophanes cristatus - (French: mésange huppée)
- Marsh tit - Poecile palustris - (French: mésange nonnette)
- Eurasian blue tit - Cyanistes caeruleus - (French: mésange bleue) resident breeder
- Great tit - Parus major - (French: mésange charbonnière) resident breeder and perhaps passage migrant

== Penduline tits ==
Order: Passeriformes Family: Remizidae

The penduline tits are a group of small insectivorous birds related to the true tits, but with complex pendulous nests.

- Eurasian penduline tit - Remiz pendulinus - (French: rémiz penduline) passage migrant and winter visitor

== Bearded reedling ==
Order: Passeriformes Family: Panuridae

This species, the only one in its family, is found in reed beds throughout temperate Europe and Asia.

- Bearded reedling - Panurus biarmicus - (French: panure à moustaches) accidental visitor

== Larks ==
Order: Passeriformes Family: Alaudidae

Larks are small terrestrial birds with often extravagant songs and display flights. Most larks are dull in appearance. Their food is insects and seeds.

- Wood lark - Lullula arborea - (French: alouette lulu) resident breeder
- Eurasian skylark - Alauda arvensis - (French: alouette des champs) passage migrant, winter visitor and resident breeder
- Crested lark - Galerida cristata - (French: cochevis huppé) accidental visitor
- Greater short-toed lark - Calandrella brachydactyla - (French: alouette calandrelle) breeding visitor and passage migrant
- Calandra lark - Melanocorypha calandra - (French: alouette calandre) passage migrant

== Swallows ==
Order: Passeriformes Family: Hirundinidae

The family Hirundinidae is adapted to aerial feeding on flying insects. They have a slender streamlined body, long pointed wings, and a short bill with a wide gape. The feet are adapted to perching rather than walking, and the front toes are partially joined at the base.

- Sand martin - Riparia riparia - (French: hirondelle de rivage) passage migrant
- Eurasian crag martin - Ptyonoprogne rupestris - (French: hirondelle de rochers) resident breeder
- Barn swallow - Hirundo rustica - (French: hirondelle rustique) passage migrant and breeding visitor
- Western house-martin - Delichon urbicum - (French: hirondelle de fenêtre) passage migrant and breeding visitor
- European red-rumped swallow - Hirundo rufigula - (French: hirondelle rousseline) passage migrant and occasional breeder

== Bush warblers and allies ==
Order: Passeriformes Family: Cettiidae

The members of this family are found across warmer areas of Europe, Africa, Asia, and Polynesia. They are insectivores.

- Cetti's warbler - Cettia cetti - (French: bouscarle de Cetti) resident breeder, passage migrant and winter visitor

== Long-tailed tits ==
Order: Passeriformes Family: Aegithalidae

Long-tailed tits are a group of small passerine birds with medium to long tails. They make woven bag nests in trees. Most eat a mixed diet which includes insects, spiders and small seeds.

- Long-tailed tit - Aegithalos longicaudus - (French: mésange à longue queue) resident breeder

== Leaf warblers ==
Order: Passeriformes Family: Phylloscopidae

Leaf warblers are a family of small insectivorous birds found mostly in Eurasia and ranging into Wallacea and Africa. The species are of various sizes, often green-plumaged above and yellow or white below, or more subdued with greyish-green to greyish-brown colours.

- Wood warbler - Phylloscopus sibilatrix - (French: pouillot siffleur) passage migrant
- Western Bonelli's warbler - Phylloscopus bonelli - (French: pouillot de Bonelli) passage migrant and occasional breeder
- Yellow-browed warbler - Phylloscopus inornatus - (French: pouillot à grands sourcils) accidental visitor
- Willow warbler - Phylloscopus trochilus - (French: pouillot fitis) passage migrant
- Common chiffchaff - Phylloscopus collybita - (French: pouillot véloce) passage migrant, winter visitor and occasional breeder
- Greenish warbler - Phylloscopus trochiloides - (French: pouillot verdâtre) accidental visitor

== Reed warblers and allies ==
Order: Passeriformes Family: Acrocephalidae

The members of this family are medium size to large warblers. Most are rather plain olivaceous brown above and yellow to pale buff below. They are usually found in open woodland, reedbeds, or tall grass. The family occurs mostly in southern to western Eurasia and surroundings, but it also ranges far into the Pacific, and several species in Africa.

- Great reed warbler - Acrocephalus arundinaceus - (French: rousserolle turdoïde) breeding visitor and passage migrant
- Moustached warbler - Acrocephalus melanopogon - (French: lusciniole à moustaches) passage migrant, winter visitor and occasional breeder
- Aquatic warbler - Acrocephalus paludicola - (French: phragmite aquatique) passage migrant
- Sedge warbler - Acrocephalus schoenobaenus - (French: phragmite des joncs) passage migrant
- Common reed warbler - Acrocephalus scirpaceus - (French: rousserolle effarvatte) breeding visitor and passage migrant
- Marsh warbler - Acrocephalus palustris - (French: rousserolle verderolle) accidental visitor
- Eastern olivaceous warbler - Iduna pallida - (French: hypolaïs pâle) accidental visitor
- Western olivaceous warbler - Iduna opaca - (French: hypolaïs obscure)
- Melodious warbler - Hippolais polyglotta - (French: hypolaïs polyglotte) passage migrant and breeding visitor
- Icterine warbler - Hippolais icterina - (French: hypolaïs ictérine) passage migrant

== Grassbirds and allies ==
Order: Passeriformes Family: Locustellidae

Locustellidae are a family of small insectivorous songbirds found mainly in Eurasia, Africa, and the Australian region. They are smallish birds with tails that are usually long and pointed, and tend to be drab brownish or buffy all over.

- River warbler - Locustella fluviatilis - (French: locustelle fluviatile) accidental visitor
- Savi's warbler - Locustella luscinioides - (French: locustelle luscinioide) passage migrant
- Common grasshopper warbler - Locustella naevia - (French: locustelle tachetée) passage migrant

== Cisticolas and allies ==
Order: Passeriformes Family: Cisticolidae

The Cisticolidae are a family of warblers found in warmer southern regions of the Old World. They are generally very small birds of drab brown or grey appearance, found in open country such as grassland or scrub.

- Zitting cisticola - Cisticola juncidis - (French: cisticole des joncs) resident breeder and passage migrant

== Sylviid warblers, parrotbills, and allies ==
Order: Passeriformes Family: Sylviidae

The family Sylviidae is a group of small insectivorous birds. They mainly occur in Europe, Asia and, to a lesser extent, Africa; the highest diversity is in the Mediterranean region. Most are generally grey-brown, but often with black or grey head patterns, and a white throat; some have a reddish breast and/or rufous wings. Many have distinctive songs.

- Eurasian blackcap - Sylvia atricapilla - (French: fauvette à tête noire) resident breeder, passage migrant and winter visitor
- Garden warbler - Sylvia borin - (French: fauvette des jardins) passage migrant
- Barred warbler - Curruca nisoria - (French: fauvette épervière) accidental visitor
- Lesser whitethroat - Curruca curruca - (French: fauvette babillarde) accidental visitor
- Western Orphean warbler - Curruca hortensis - (French: fauvette orphée) occasional breeder and possibly passage migrant
- Rüppell's warbler - Curruca hortensis - (French: fauvette de Rüppell) accidental visitor
- Sardinian warbler - Curruca melanocephala - (French: fauvette mélanocéphale) resident breeder
- Moltoni's warbler Curruca subalpina - (French: fauvette de Moltoni) breeding visitor and passage migrant
- Eastern subalpine warbler - Curruca cantillans - (French: fauvette passerinette) accidental visitor
- Common whitethroat - Curruca communis - (French: fauvette grisette) passage migrant and occasional breeder
- Spectacled warbler - Curruca conspicillata - (French: fauvette à lunettes) passage migrant and breeding visitor
- Marmora's warbler Curruca sarda - (French: fauvette sarde) resident breeder
- Dartford warbler - Curruca undata - (French: fauvette pitchou) resident breeder

== Kinglets ==
Order: Passeriformes Family: Regulidae

The crests and kinglets are a small family of birds which resemble some warblers. They are very small insectivorous birds in the single genus Regulus. The adults have coloured crowns, giving rise to their name.

- Goldcrest - Regulus regulus - (French: roitelet huppé) resident breeder
- Common firecrest - Regulus ignicapillus - (French: roitelet à triple bandeau) resident breeder

== Wrens ==
Order: Passeriformes Family: Troglodytidae

The wrens are mainly small and inconspicuous except for their loud songs. They have short wings and thin down-turned bills, and often hold their tails upright. All are insectivorous. The family is almost entirely found in the New World, with just one species widespread in the Old World, including Corsica.

- Eurasian wren - Troglodytes troglodytes - (French: troglodyte mignon) resident breeder and possibly a passage migrant

== Nuthatches ==
Order: Passeriformes Family: Sittidae

Nuthatches are small woodland birds. They have the unusual ability to climb down trees head first, unlike other birds which can only go upwards. Nuthatches have big heads, short tails and powerful bills and feet. The Corsican nuthatch is France's sole endemic species.

- Corsican nuthatch - Sitta whiteheadi - (French: sittelle corse) resident breeder

== Wallcreeper ==
Order: Passeriformes Family: Tichodromidae

The wallcreeper is a small bird of mountain crags related to the nuthatch family, which has stunning crimson, grey, and black plumage. It is the only species in its family.

- Wallcreeper - Tichodroma muraria - (French: tichodrome échelette) winter visitor and resident breeder

== Treecreepers ==
Order: Passeriformes Family: Certhiidae

Treecreepers are small woodland birds, brown above and white below. They have thin pointed down-curved bills, which they use to extricate insects from bark. They have stiff tail feathers, like woodpeckers, which they use to support themselves on vertical trees.

- Eurasian treecreeper - Certhia familiaris - (French: grimpereau des bois) resident breeder
- Short-toed treecreeper - Certhia brachydactyla - (French: grimpereau des jardins) accidental visitor

== Starlings ==
Order: Passeriformes Family: Sturnidae

Starlings are small to medium-sized passerine birds. Their flight is strong and direct and they are very gregarious. Their preferred habitat is fairly open country. They eat insects and fruit. Their plumage is variable; many are dark with a strong to very strong metallic sheen, others are brightly patterned in pink, yellow, or other colours.

- Rosy starling - Pastor roseus - (French: étourneau roselin) accidental visitor
- European starling - Sturnus vulgaris - (French: étourneau sansonnet) winter visitor, passage migrant and occasional breeder
- Spotless starling - Sturnus unicolor - (French: étourneau unicolore) resident breeder

== Thrushes and allies ==
Order: Passeriformes Family: Turdidae

The thrushes are a group of passerine birds that occur mainly in the Old World. They are plump, soft-plumaged, small-to-medium-sized insectivores or sometimes omnivores, often feeding on the ground. Many have attractive songs.

- White's thrush - Zoothera aurea - (French: grive dorée) accidental visitor
- Song thrush - Turdus philomelos - (French: grive musicienne) passage migrant and winter visitor
- Mistle thrush - Turdus viscivorus - (French: grive draine) passage migrant and winter visitor
- Redwing - Turdus iliacus - (French: grive mauvis) passage migrant and winter visitor
- Common blackbird - Turdus merula - (French: merle noir) resident breeder, passage migrant and winter visitor
- Fieldfare - Turdus pilaris - (French: grive litorne) passage migrant and winter visitor
- Ring ouzel - Turdus torquatus - (French: merle à plastron) passage migrant and possibly a winter visitor
- Dusky thrush - Turdus eunomus - (French: grive à ailes rousses) accidental visitor
- Naumann's thrush - Turdus naumanni - (French: grive de Naumann) accidental visitor

== Old World flycatchers ==
Order: Passeriformes Family: Muscicapidae

Old World flycatchers are a large group of birds which are mainly small arboreal insectivores. The appearance of these birds is highly varied, but they mostly have weak songs and harsh calls.

- Spotted flycatcher - Muscicapa striata - (French: gobemouche gris) passage migrant
- Mediterranean flycatcher - Muscicapa tyrrhenica - (French: gobemouche tyrrhénien) breeding visitor
- European robin - Erithacus rubecula - (French: rougegorge familier) resident breeder, passage migrant and winter visitor
- Thrush nightingale - Luscinia luscinia - (French: rossignol progné) accidental visitor
- Common nightingale - Luscinia megarhynchos - (French: rossignol philomèle) breeding visitor and passage migrant
- Bluethroat - Luscinia svecica - (French: gorgebleue à miroir) passage migrant
- Red-breasted flycatcher - Ficedula parva - (French: gobemouche nain) accidental visitor
- Semicollared flycatcher - Ficedula semitorquata - (French: gobemouche à demi-collier) accidental visitor
- European pied flycatcher Ficedula hypoleuca - (French: gobemouche noir) passage migrant
- Collared flycatcher - Ficedula albicollis - (French: gobemouche à collier) passage migrant
- Black redstart - Phoenicurus ochruros - (French: rougequeue noir) passage migrant, winter visitor and occasional breeder
- Common redstart - Phoenicurus phoenicurus - (French: rougequeue à front blanc) passage migrant
- Common rock thrush - Monticola saxatilis - (French: monticole merle-de-roche) breeding visitor and passage migrant
- Blue rock thrush - Monticola solitarius - (French: monticole merle-bleu) resident breeder
- Whinchat - Saxicola rubetra - (French: tarier des prés) passage migrant and occasional breeder
- European stonechat - Saxicola rubicola - (French: tarier pâtre) passage migrant, winter visitor and resident breeder
- Northern wheatear - Oenanthe oenanthe - (French: traquet motteux) passage migrant and breeding visitor
- Isabelline wheatear - Oenanthe isabellina - (French: traquet isabelle) accidental visitor
- Desert wheatear - Oenanthe deserti - (French: traquet du désert) accidental visitor
- Western black-eared wheatear - Oenanthe hispanica - (French: traquet oreillard) passage migrant

== Dippers ==
Order: Passeriformes Family: Cinclidae

Dippers are a group of perching birds whose habitat includes aquatic environments in the Americas, Europe and Asia. They are named for their bobbing or dipping movements.

- White-throated dipper - Cinclus cinclus - (French: cincle plongeur) resident breeder

== Old World sparrows ==
Order: Passeriformes Family: Passeridae

Sparrows are small passerine birds. In general, sparrows tend to be small, plump, brown or grey birds with short tails and short powerful beaks. Sparrows are seed eaters, but they also consume small insects.

- Rock sparrow - Petronia petronia - (French: moineau soulcie) resident breeder and passage migrant
- White-winged snowfinch - Montifringilla nivalis - (French: niverolle alpine) resident breeder
- Eurasian tree sparrow - Passer montanus - (French: moineau friquet) resident breeder
- Spanish sparrow - Passer hispaniolensis - (French: moineau espagnol) resident breeder
- Italian sparrow - Passer italiae - (French: moineau cisalpin) resident breeder and passage migrant
- House sparrow - Passer domesticus - (French: moineau domestique) accidental visitor and occasional breeder

== Accentors and dunnocks ==
Order: Passeriformes Family: Prunellidae

The accentors and dunnocks are the only bird family which is endemic to the Palearctic. They are small, fairly drab species superficially similar to sparrows, but with a slender bill.

- Alpine accentor - Prunella collaris - (French: accenteur alpin) resident breeder and possibly a winter visitor
- Dunnock - Prunella modularis - (French: accenteur mouchet) winter visitor and passage migrant

== Wagtails and pipits ==
Order: Passeriformes Family: Motacillidae

Motacillidae is a family of small passerine birds with medium to long tails. They include the wagtails, longclaws and pipits. They are slender, ground feeding insectivores of open country.

- Western yellow wagtail - Motacilla flava - (French: bergeronnette printanière) passage migrant and occasional breeder
- Citrine wagtail - Motacilla citreola - (French: bergeronnette citrine) accidental visitor
- Grey wagtail - Motacilla cinerea - (French: bergeronnette des ruisseaux) resident breeder and winter visitor
- White wagtail - Motacilla alba - (French: bergeronnette grise) passage migrant, winter visitor and occasional breeder
- Richard's pipit - Anthus richardi - (French: pipit de Richard) accidental visitor
- Tawny pipit - Anthus campestris - (French: pipit rousseline) breeding visitor and passage migrant
- Meadow pipit - Anthus pratensis - (French: pipit farlouse) passage migrant and winter visitor
- Tree pipit - Anthus trivialis - (French: pipit des arbres) passage migrant
- Red-throated pipit - Anthus cervinus - (French: pipit à gorge rousse) passage migrant
- Water pipit - Anthus spinoletta - (French: pipit spioncelle) passage migrant, winter visitor and possibly breeding visitor
- European rock pipit - Anthus petrosus - (French: pipit maritime)

== Finches and allies ==
Order: Passeriformes Family: Fringillidae

Finches are seed-eating passerine birds, that are small to moderately large and have a strong beak, usually conical and in some species very large. All have twelve tail feathers and nine primaries. These birds have a bouncing flight with alternating bouts of flapping and gliding on closed wings, and most sing well.

- Common chaffinch - Fringilla coelebs - (French: pinson des arbres) resident breeder, passage migrant and winter visitor
- Brambling - Fringilla montifringilla - (French: pinson du Nord) passage migrant and winter visitor
- Hawfinch - Coccothraustes coccothraustes - (French: gros-bec casse-noyaux) passage migrant, winter visitor and residential breeder
- Eurasian bullfinch - Pyrrhula pyrrhula - (French: bouvreuil pivoine) accidental visitor
- Trumpeter finch - Rhodopechys githaginea - (French: roselin githagine) accidental visitor
- Common rosefinch - Carpodacus erythrinus - (French: roselin cramoisi)
- European greenfinch - Chloris chloris - (French: verdier d'Europe) resident breeder
- Common linnet - Linaria cannabina - (French: linotte mélodieuse) resident breeder, passage migrant and winter visitor
- Common redpoll - Acanthis flammea - (French: sizerin flammé)
- Red crossbill - Loxia curvirostra - (French: bec-croisé des sapins) resident breeder and passage migrant
- European goldfinch - Carduelis carduelis - (French: chardonneret élégant) resident breeder and perhaps passage migrant
- Citril finch - Carduelis citrinella - (French: venturon montagnard)
- Corsican finch - Carduelis corsicana - (French: venturon corse) resident breeder
- European serin - Serinus serinus - (French: serin cini) resident breeder and passage migrant
- Eurasian siskin - Spinus spinus - (French: tarin des aulnes) passage migrant, winter visitor and occasional breeder

== Longspurs and snow buntings ==
Order: Passeriformes Family: Calcariidae

The Calcariidae are a group of passerine birds which had been traditionally grouped with the buntings, but differ in a number of respects and are usually found in open grassy areas.

- Lapland longspur - Calcarius lapponicus - (French: bruant lapon)
- Snow bunting - Plectrophenax nivalis - (French: plectrophane des neiges) accidental visitor

== Old World buntings ==
Order: Passeriformes Family: Emberizidae

The emberizids are a large family of passerine birds. They are seed-eating birds with distinctively shaped bills. Many emberizid species have distinctive head patterns.

- Corn bunting - Emberiza calandra - (French: bruant proyer) passage migrant, winter visitor and resident breeder
- Yellowhammer - Emberiza citrinella - (French: bruant jaune) passage migrant
- Rock bunting - Emberiza cia - (French: bruant fou) accidental visitor
- Ortolan bunting - Emberiza hortulana - (French: bruant ortolan) passage migrant
- Cirl bunting Emberiza cirlus - (French: bruant zizi) resident breeder
- Little bunting - Emberiza pusilla - (French: bruant nain) accidental visitor
- Black-headed bunting - Emberiza melanocephala - (French: bruant mélanocéphale) accidental visitor
- Red-headed bunting - Emberiza bruniceps - (French: bruant à tête rousse) accidental visitor
- Common reed bunting - Emberiza schoeniclus - (French: bruant des roseaux) passage migrant and winter visitor

== See also ==
- List of birds of Metropolitan France
- List of birds
- Lists of birds by region
