= Western Palearctic black-and-white flycatchers =

Group of birds

The term Western Palearctic black-and-white flycatchers is used to refer to a group of similar-looking birds in the genus Ficedula:

- Atlas pied flycatcher F. speculigera which breeds in Northwest Africa
- Collared flycatcher F. albicollis which breeds in Eastern Europe
- European pied flycatcher F. hypoleuca which breeds in Western Europe
- Semi-collared flycatcher F. semitorquata of Southeast Europe and Southwest Asia

European pied and collared flycatchers hybridise to a limited extent where their ranges meet; the hybrids have reduced fitness and usually do not survive their first winter (Parkin 2003). Female hybrids are usually sterile (Gelter et al. 1992; see also Haldane's Rule).

All species leave their breeding grounds to winter in Sub-Saharan Africa.

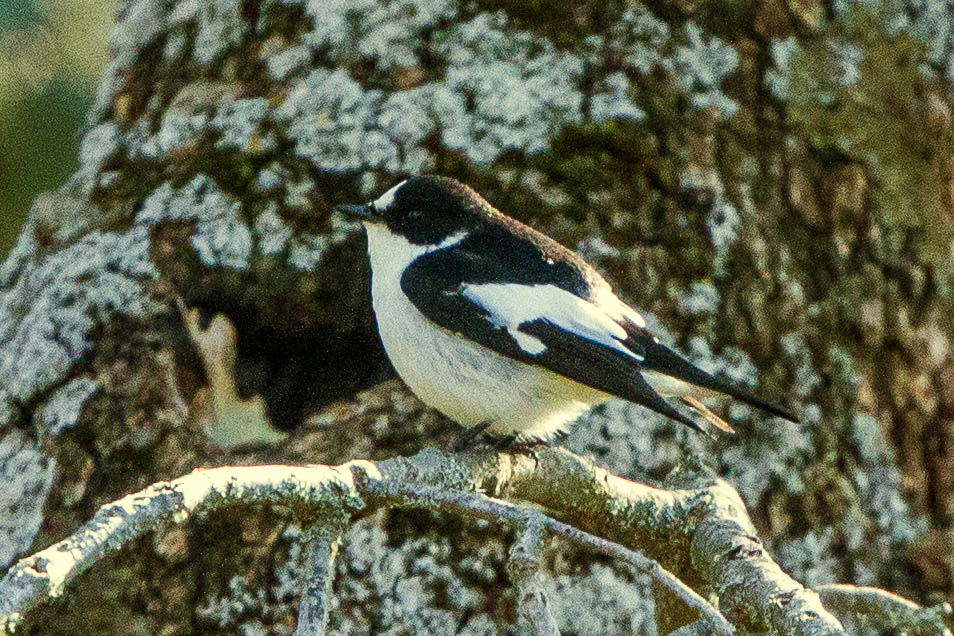
Atlas Flycatcher (Ficedula speculigera)

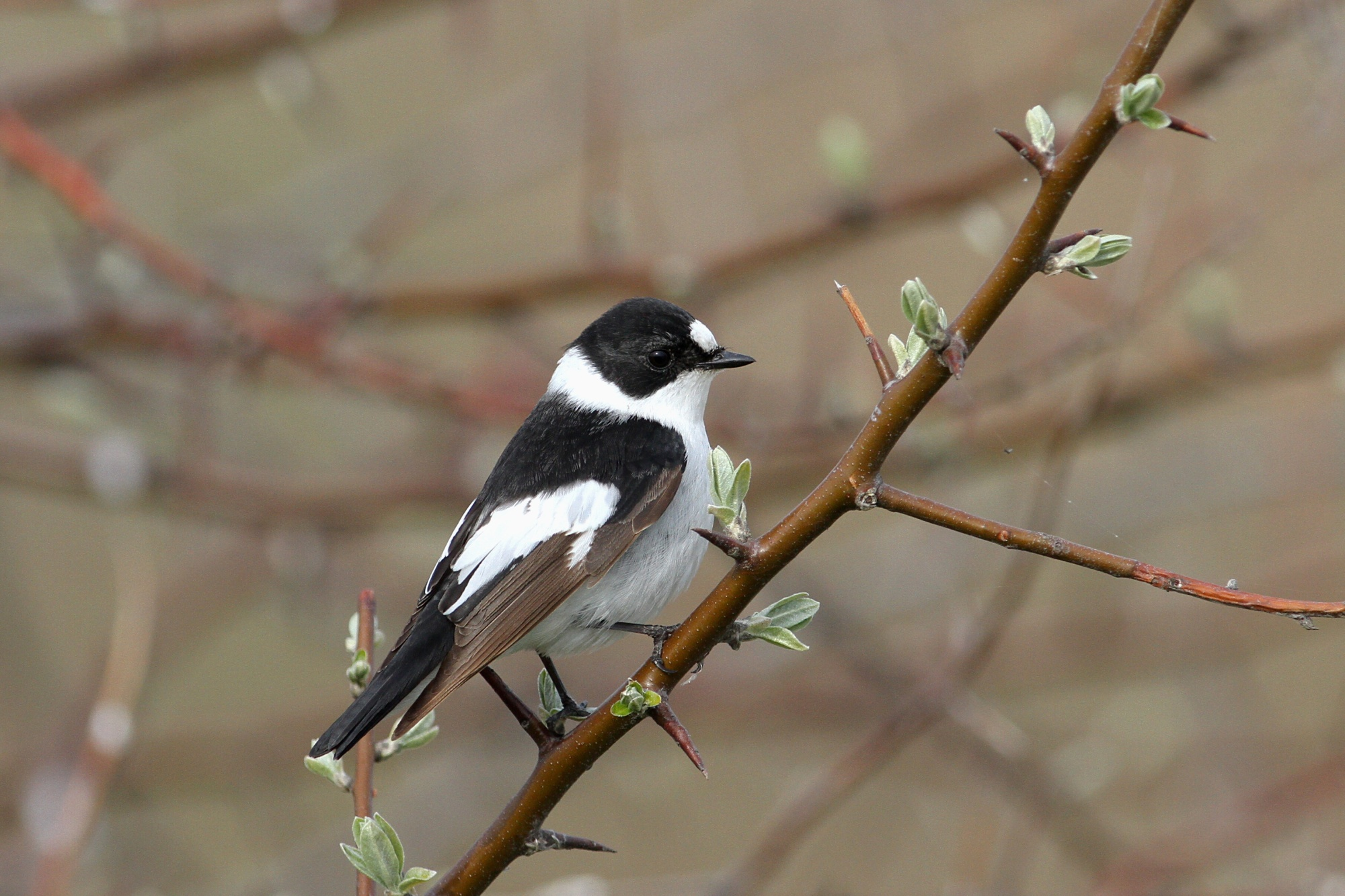
Collared flycatcher (Ficedula albicollis)

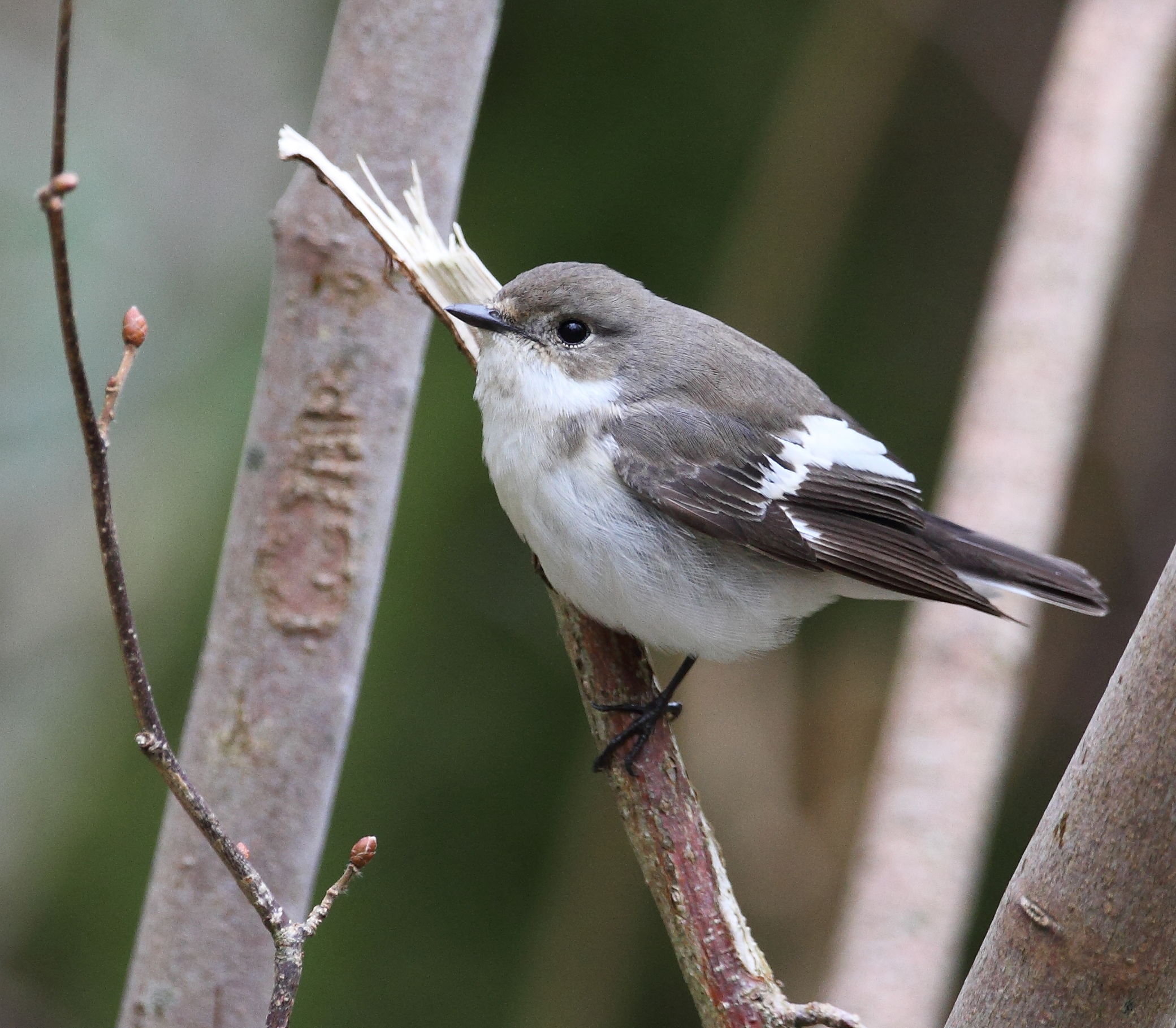
European pied flycatcher (Ficedula hypoleuca)

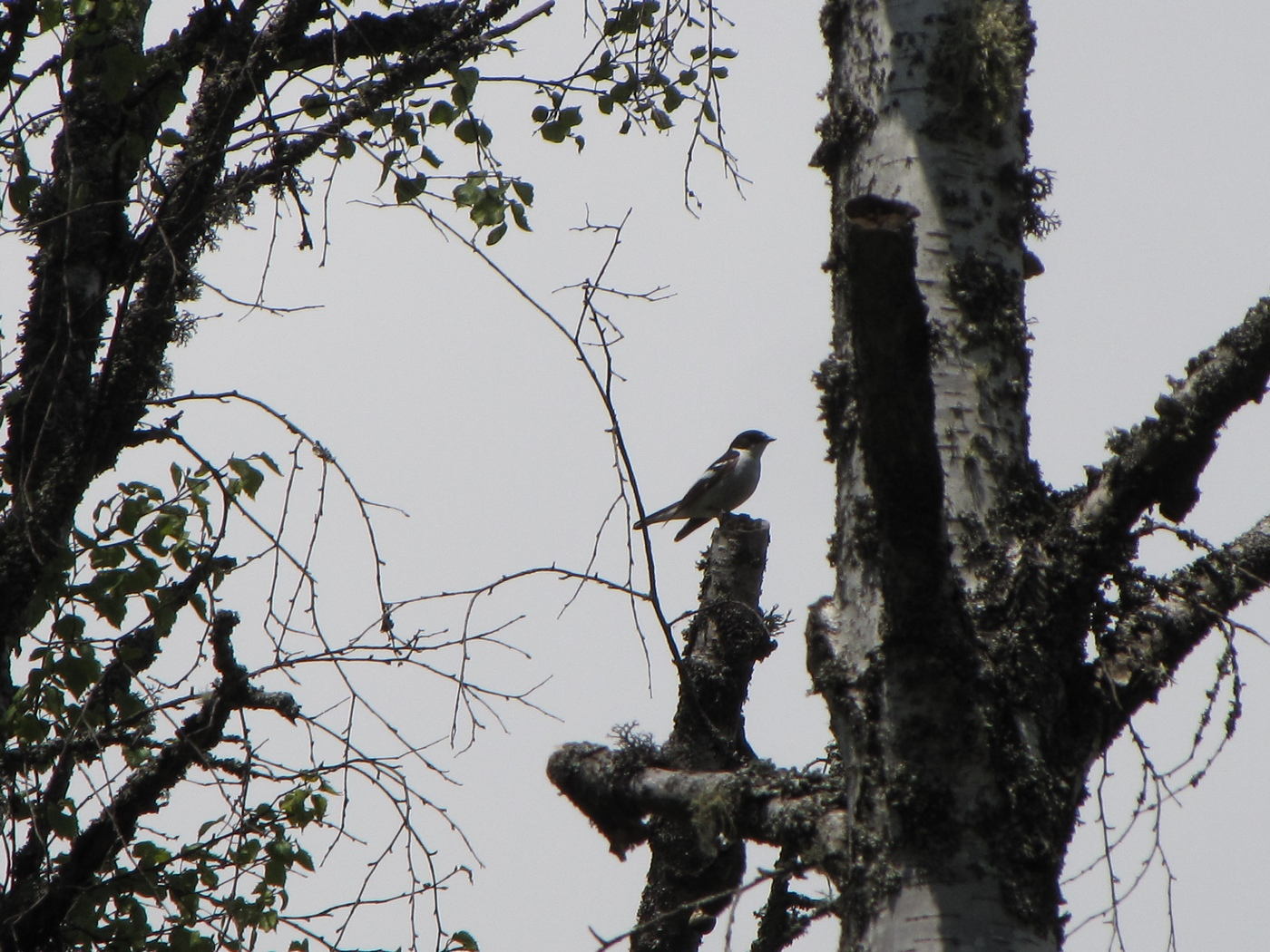
Semi-collared flycatcher (Ficedula semitorquata)
