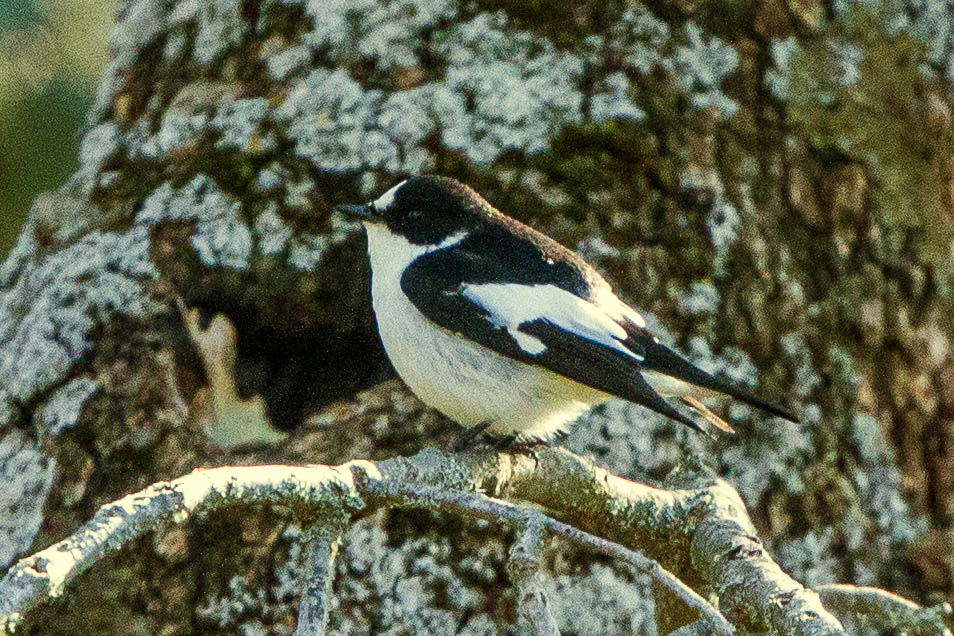

Scientific classification
- Kingdom: Animalia
- Phylum: Chordata
- Class: Aves
- Order: Passeriformes
- Family: Muscicapidae
- Genus: Ficedula
- Species: F. speculigera

Binomial name
- Ficedula speculigera (Bonaparte, 1850)

Synonyms
- Muscicapa speculifera Bonaparte, 1850; Ficedula hypoleuca speculigera (Bonaparte, 1850)

= Atlas pied flycatcher =

Species of bird

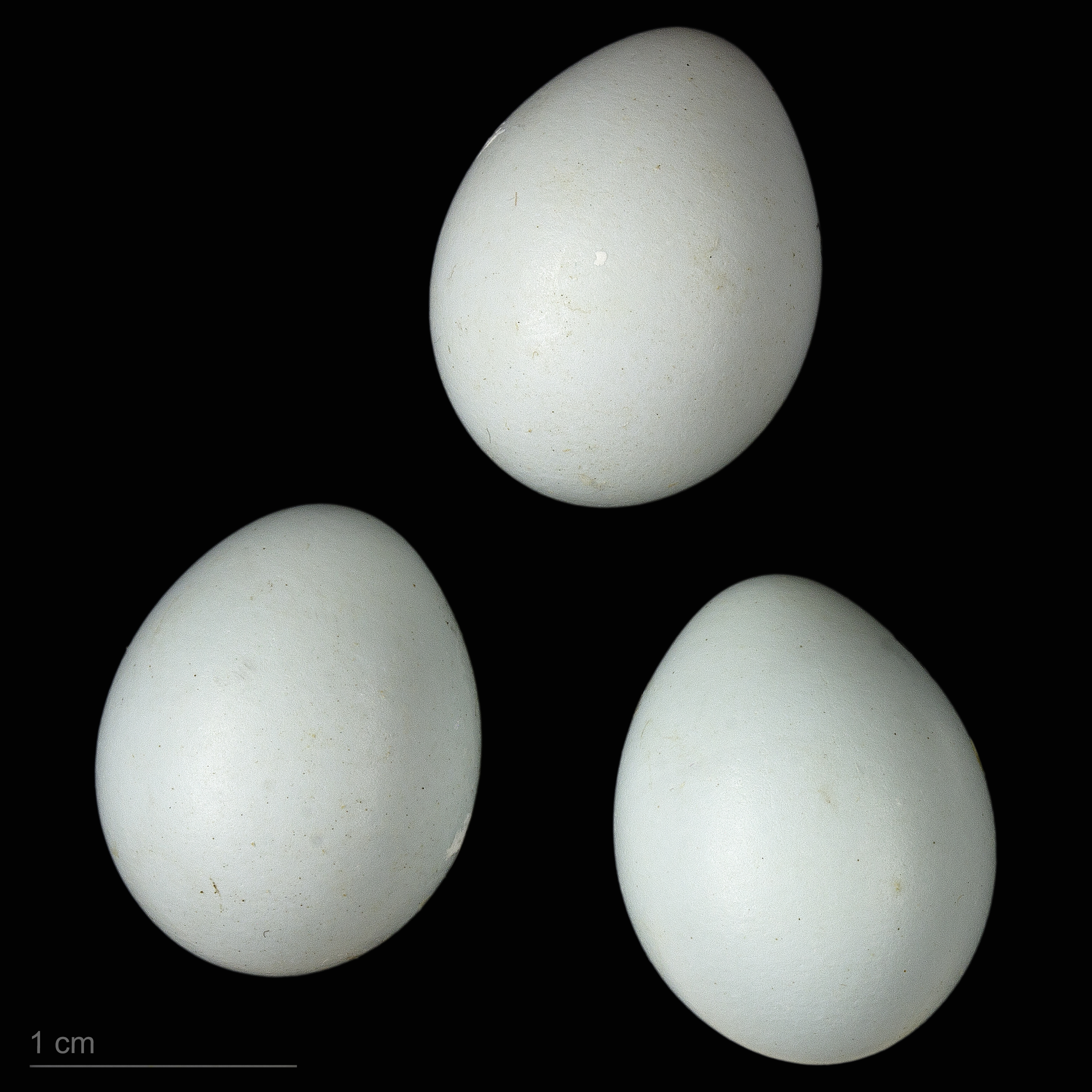
Ficedula speculigera - MHNT

The Atlas pied flycatcher or Atlas flycatcher (Ficedula speculigera) is a bird in an Old World flycatcher family, one of the four species of Western Palearctic black-and-white flycatchers; it is endemic as a breeding species to North-west Africa.

It was formerly regarded as a race of European pied flycatcher, but Sætre et al. (2001) recommended that it is regarded as a species in its own right. The bird has large white patches on its wing and forehead. Identification is also covered in Etherington and Small (2003) and van den Berg et al. (2006).
