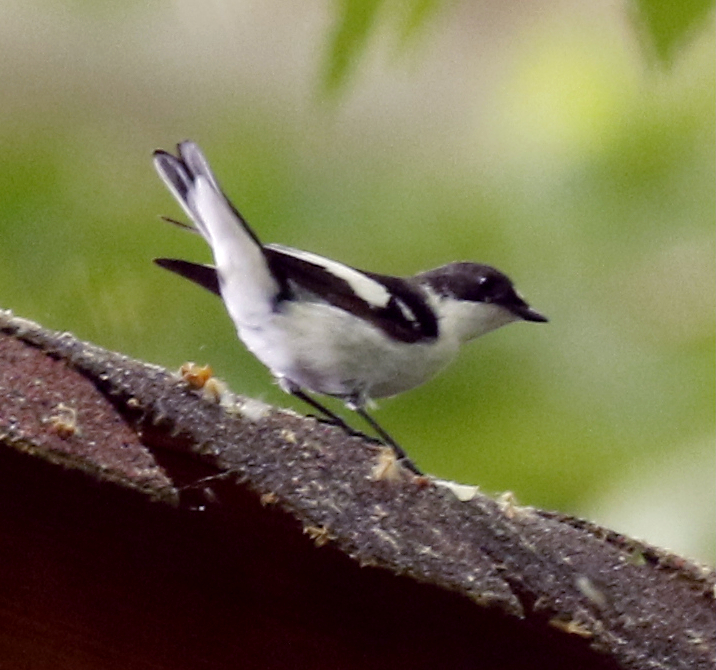

Conservation status
- Least Concern (IUCN 3.1)

Scientific classification
- Kingdom: Animalia
- Phylum: Chordata
- Class: Aves
- Order: Passeriformes
- Family: Muscicapidae
- Genus: Ficedula
- Species: F. semitorquata

Binomial name
- Ficedula semitorquata (Homeyer, 1885)

= Semicollared flycatcher =

Species of bird

The semicollared flycatcher (Ficedula semitorquata) is a small passerine bird in the Old World flycatcher family, one of the four species of Western Palearctic black-and-white flycatchers. It breeds in montane forests of the southeastern corner of Europe (Balkan Peninsula) to Northwest Iran. It is migratory, wintering in Central and Eastern Africa. It is a rare vagrant in western Europe. Tracking studies using geolocators have revealed that weather conditions during spring migration can have a large impact on the timing of semicollared flycatcher migration and survival of adult birds.

This is a 12–13.5 cm long bird, intermediate in appearance between collared flycatcher and European pied flycatcher. It has often been classed as a subspecies of collared flycatcher.

The breeding male is mainly black above and white below, with a white half-collar (usually extending further back than in European pied), large white wing patch, a white bar on median coverts (absent in European Pied and collared), extensively white tail sides and a large white forehead patch. It often has a pale grey rump. The bill is black and has the broad but pointed shape typical of aerial insectivores. It mainly takes insects in flight, rarely hunting caterpillars amongst the tree foliage like pied flycatcher.

Non-breeding male, females and juvenile semi-collared flycatchers have the black replaced by a pale brown, and may be very difficult to distinguish from other Ficedula flycatchers, particularly the collared flycatcher. A distinction is that semicollared in these plumages often show narrower white edges to tertials. A white bar on median coverts is also typical of female-type plumages, though first winters of European pied and collared flycatchers may also show this feature.

Semicollared flycatchers are birds of belts of deciduous woodlands, especially oak and hornbeam, in mountainous areas. They build an open nest in a native tree-holes and old nests of woodpeckers, also the species can occupy nest-boxes. The clutch size is 4-7 eggs. The song is again intermediate between collared and pied flycatchers, with slow strained whistles, but some rhythmic elements.

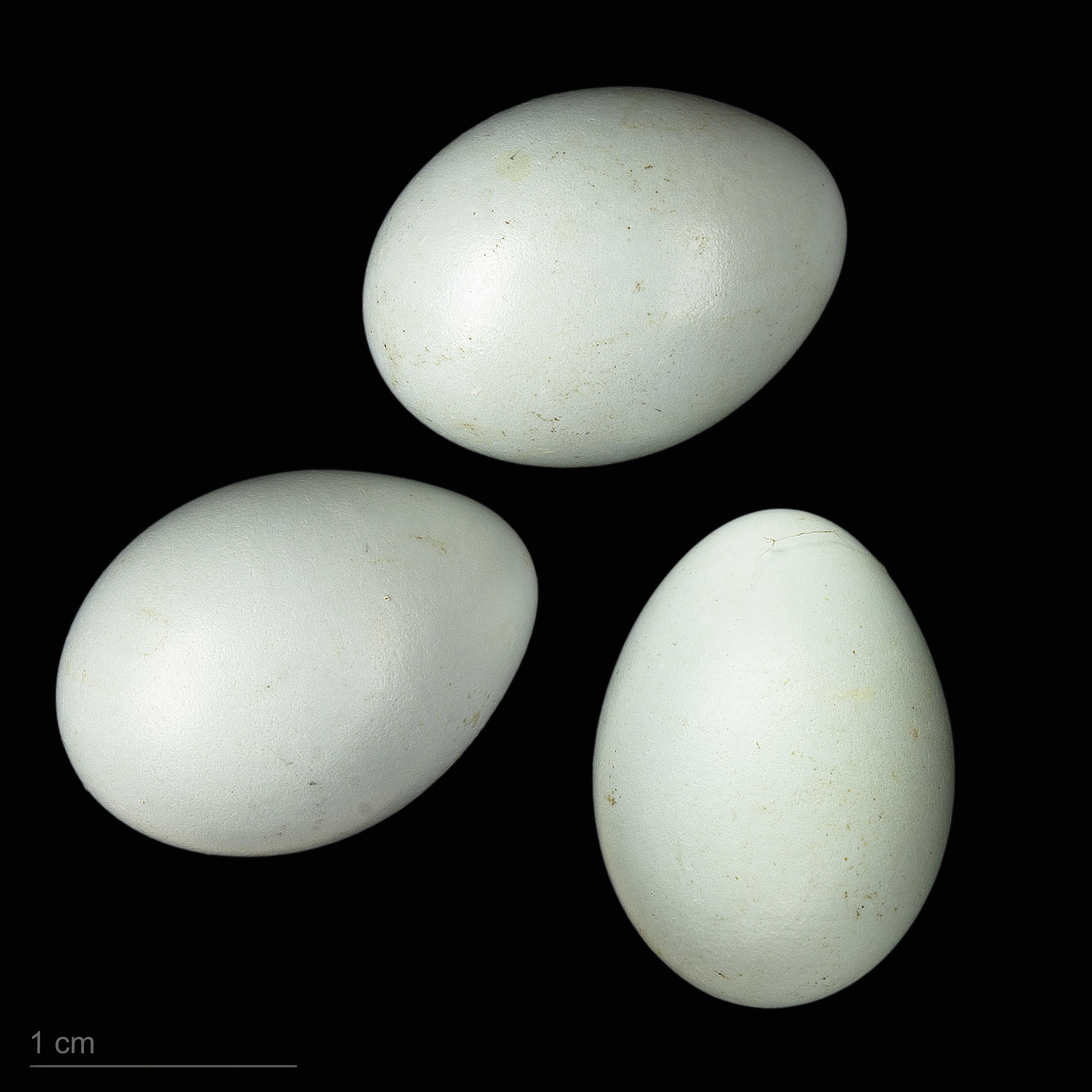
Ficedula semitorquata - MHNT
