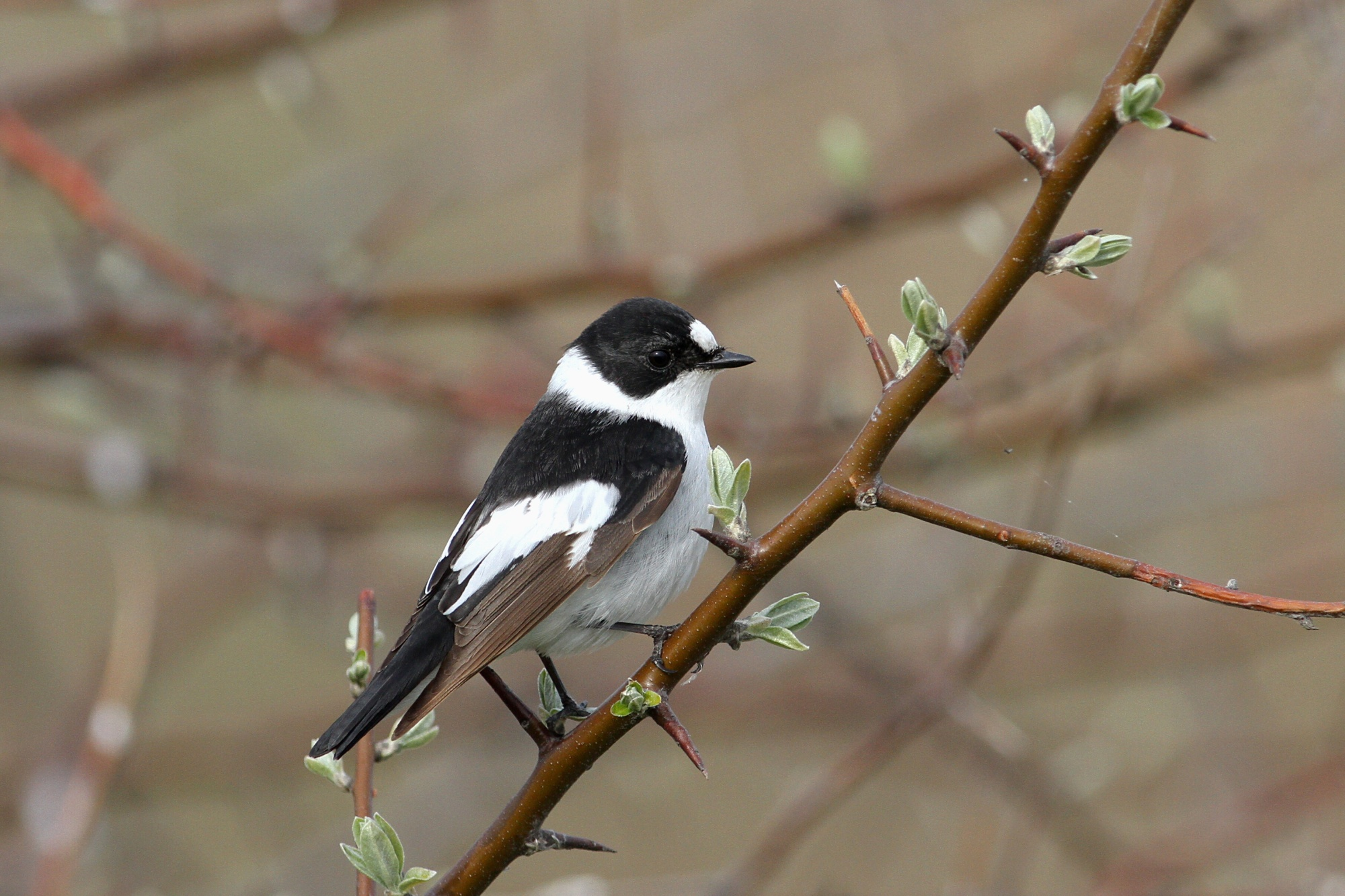
- Adult male

Conservation status
- Least Concern (IUCN 3.1)

Scientific classification
- Kingdom: Animalia
- Phylum: Chordata
- Class: Aves
- Order: Passeriformes
- Family: Muscicapidae
- Genus: Ficedula
- Species: F. albicollis

Binomial name
- Ficedula albicollis (Temminck, 1815)
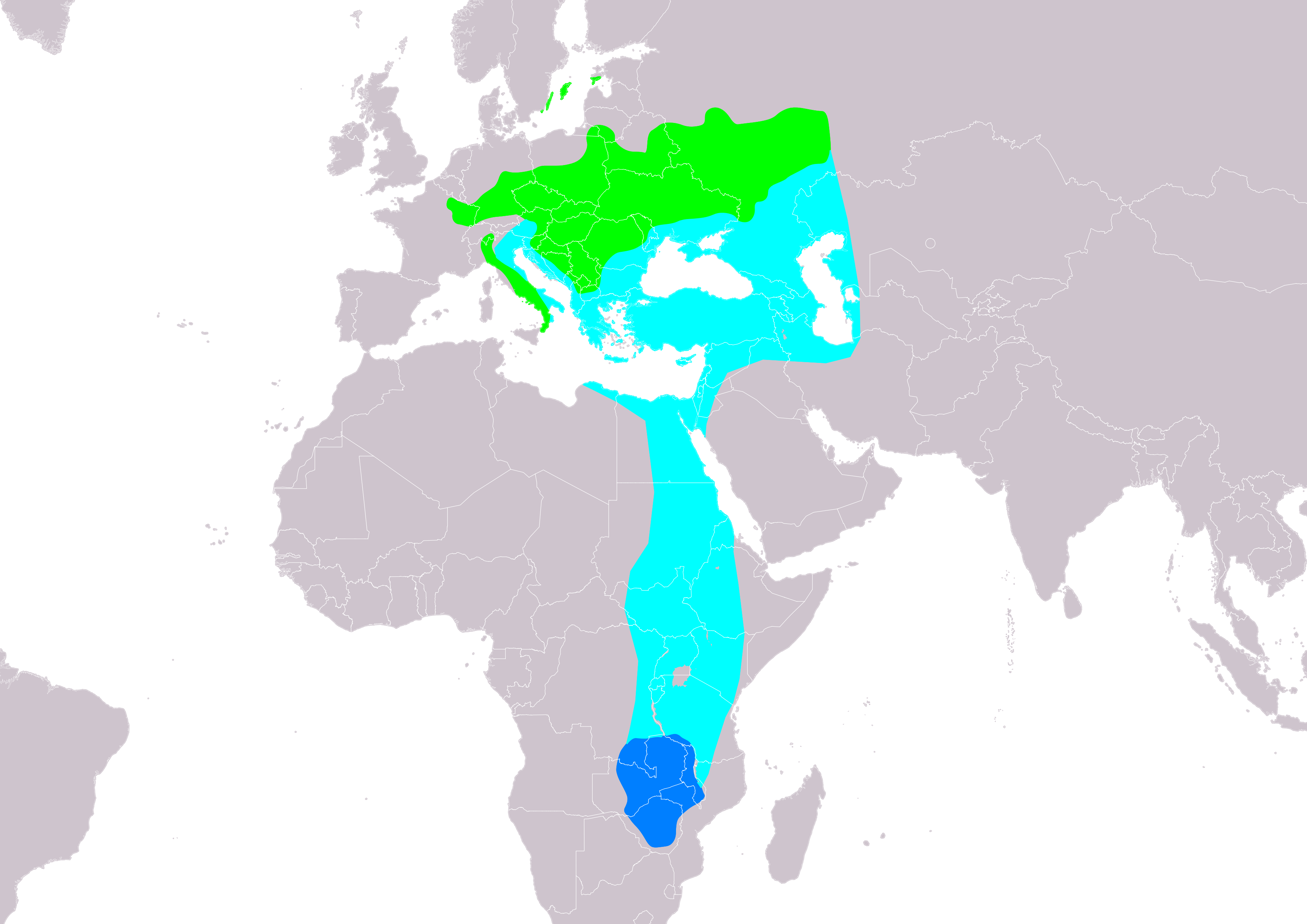
- Range of F. albicollis Breeding Passage Non-breeding

Audio
- The song of a male recorded in Slovakia

= Collared flycatcher =

Species of bird

The collared flycatcher (Ficedula albicollis) is a small passerine bird in the Old World flycatcher family, one of the four species of Western Palearctic black-and-white flycatchers. It breeds in southeast Europe (isolated populations are present in the islands of Gotland and Öland in the Baltic Sea, Sweden) and Eastern France to the Balkan Peninsula and Ukraine and is migratory, wintering in Sub-Saharan Africa. It is a rare vagrant in western Europe.

This is a 12–13.5 cm long bird. The breeding male is mainly black above and white below, with a white collar, large white wing patch, black tail (although some males have white tail sides) and a large white forehead patch. It has a pale rump. The bill is black and has the broad but pointed shape typical of aerial insectivores. As well as taking insects in flight, this species hunts caterpillars amongst the oak foliage, and will take berries.

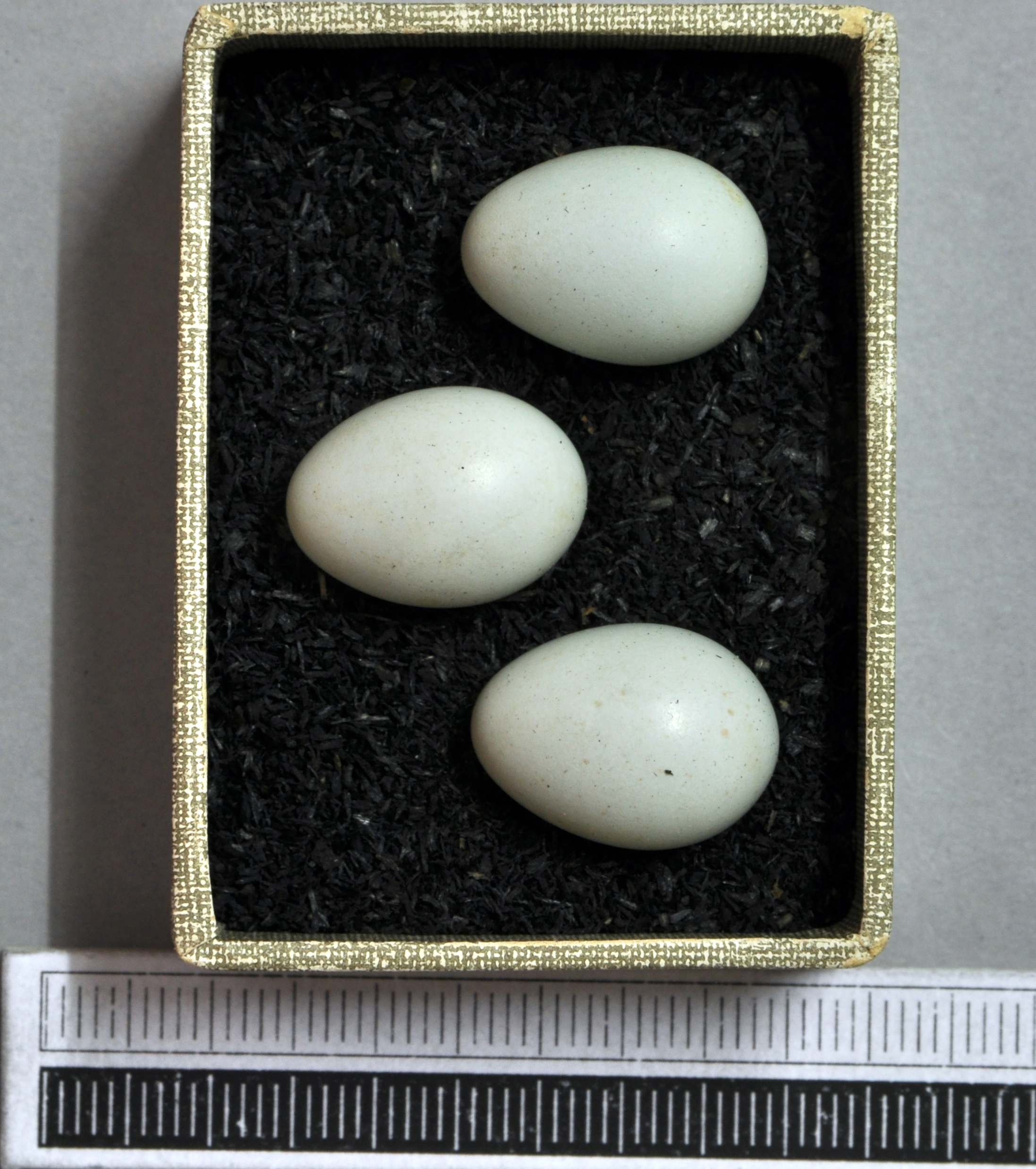
Eggs, Collection Museum Wiesbaden

Non-breeding males, females and juveniles have the black replaced by a pale brown, and may be very difficult to distinguish from other Ficedula flycatchers, particularly the European pied flycatcher (F. hypoleuca) and the semicollared flycatcher (F. semitorquata), with which this species hybridizes to a limited extent.

F. albicollis vis-a-vis F. hypoleuca are speciating from each other by reinforcement, as evidenced by differences between colouration in sympatry versus allopatry. This is evidence for speciation by reinforcement.

They are birds of deciduous woodlands, parks and gardens, with a preference for old trees with cavities in which it nests. They build an open nest in a tree hole, or man-made nest-boxes. Normally 5-7 eggs are laid. The song is slow strained whistles, quite unlike the pied flycatcher. Pied flycatchers can mimic the song of the collared flycatcher in sympatric populations.

The genus name is from Latin and refers to a small fig-eating bird (ficus, "fig") supposed to change into the blackcap in winter. The specific albicollis is from Latin albus, white, and collum, "neck".

The collared flycatcher is used as a model species in both ecology and genetics and it was one of the first birds that had its full genome sequenced. Repeated spectrometric data taken from male collared flycatchers has revealed that plumage reflectance should be measured during courtship, the primary period of sexual signalling, with spectral traits declining over the breeding season.

In a natural population of F. albicollis inbreeding appeared to be rare, but when it did occur it had severe negative consequences for fitness characteristics such as hatching success rate.

== Range expansion and hybridisation with F. hypoleuca on Öland, Sweden ==
In the 1960s, collared flycatchers expanded their breeding range northward, colonizing the Swedish island of Öland in the Baltic Sea. This expansion, a response to climate change, brought them into sympatry with the European pied flycatcher. The breeding population dynamics and hybridization between these two species have been monitored on the island since 2002, giving scientists the rare opportunity to study life-history traits, hybridization, climate adaptation, and speciation.

On Öland, the socially dominant collared flycatcher, which rely heavily on high-quality habitat, have displaced most European pied flycatcher to poorer breeding habitats. Although hybridization occurs in approximately 4% of the population, there is a strong selection against hybrids. The resulting F1 hybrids of both sexes have lower fitness and are sterile: females experience hatching failure, while males suffer from impaired sperm morphology.
