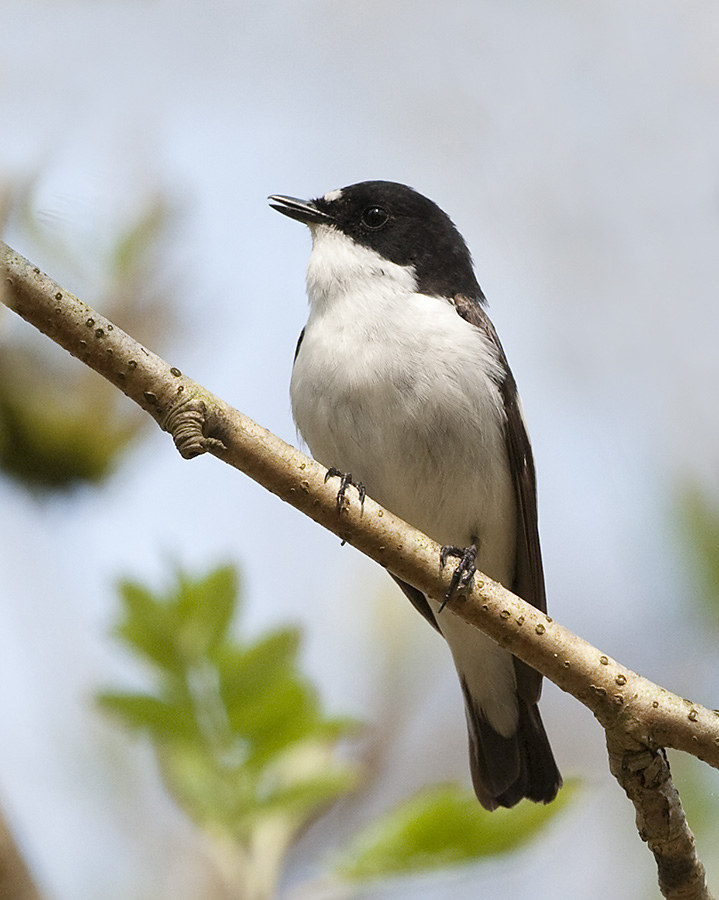
- Adult male in Scotland The song of a male European pied flycatcher, recorded at Yarner Wood, Devon, England

Conservation status
- Least Concern (IUCN 3.1)

Scientific classification
- Kingdom: Animalia
- Phylum: Chordata
- Class: Aves
- Order: Passeriformes
- Family: Muscicapidae
- Genus: Ficedula
- Species: F. hypoleuca

Binomial name
- Ficedula hypoleuca (Pallas, 1764)
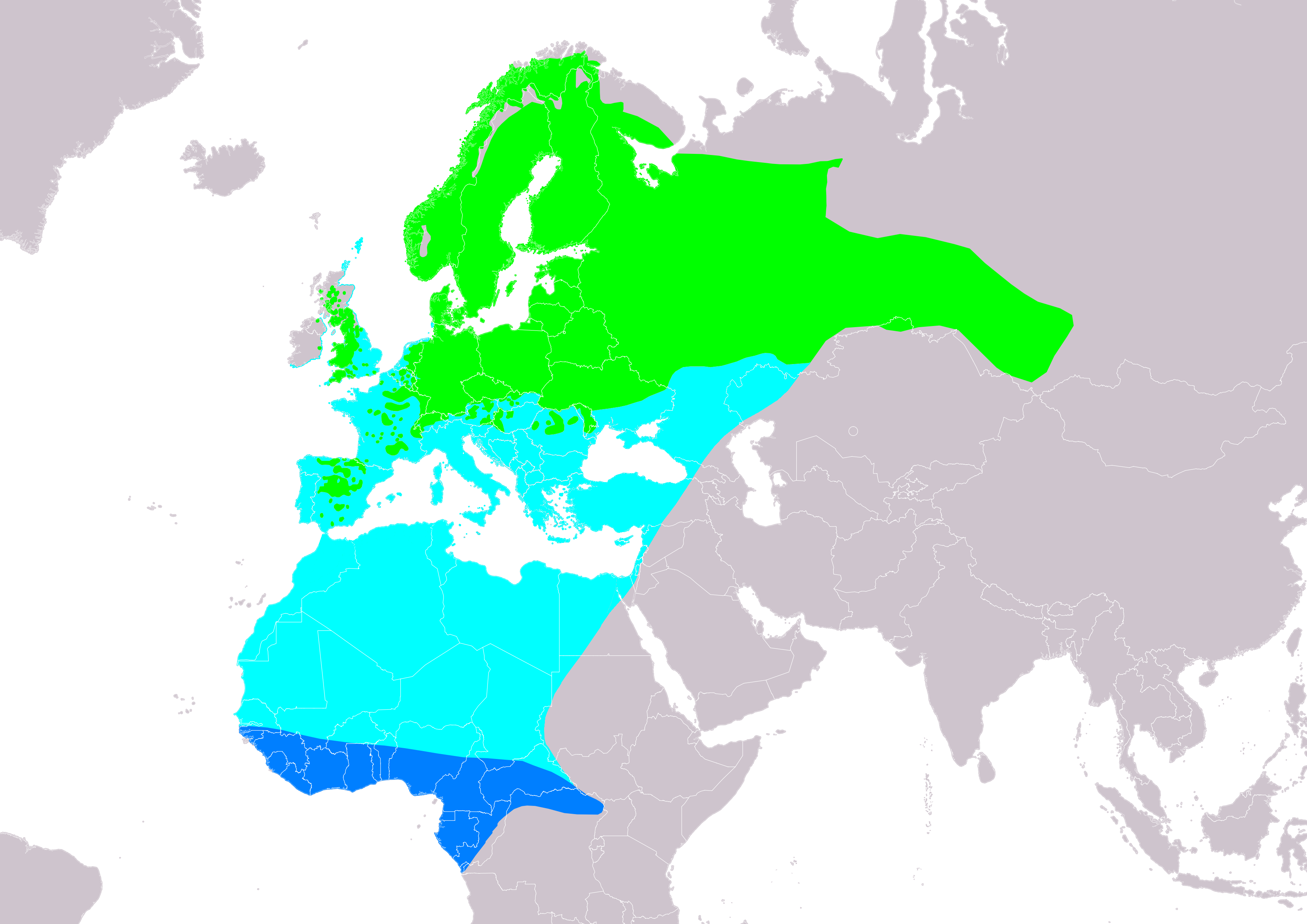
- Range of F. hypoleuca Breeding Passage Non-breeding

Synonyms
- Muscicapa luctuosa Temm.

= European pied flycatcher =

Species of bird

European pied flycatchers, 2010 in Texel, Netherlands

The European pied flycatcher (Ficedula hypoleuca) is a small passerine bird in the Old World flycatcher family. One of the four species of Western Palearctic black-and-white flycatchers, it hybridises to a limited extent with the collared flycatcher. It breeds in most of Europe and across the Western Palearctic. It is migratory, wintering mainly in tropical Africa. It usually builds its nests in holes on oak trees. This species practices polygyny, usually bigamy, with the male travelling large distances to acquire a second mate. The male will mate with the secondary female and then return to the primary female in order to help with aspects of child rearing, such as feeding.

The European pied flycatcher is mainly insectivorous, although its diet also includes other arthropods. This species commonly feeds on caterpillars, flies, spiders, ants, bees and similar prey.

The European pied flycatcher has a very large range and population size and so it is of least concern according to the International Union for Conservation of Nature (IUCN).

== Taxonomy ==
The European pied flycatcher is an Old World flycatcher, part of a family of insectivorous songbirds which typically feed by darting after insects. The Latin word ficedula means "small fig-eating bird". The term hypoleuca comes from two Greek roots, hupo, "below", and leukos, "white".

The species was described in Linnaeus's Fauna Svecica (1746), a work that was not binomial and that is therefore unavailable nomenclaturally. Later, in the tenth edition of his Systema Naturae and the next edition of Fauna Svecica (1761), Linnaeus confused this flycatcher with the Eurasian blackcap and the whinchat. To this point, the European pied flycatcher still lacked a proper valid binominal name. The species was finally named as Motacilla hypoleuca by the German naturalist Peter Simon Pallas in 1764. However, he described this species anonymously in the appendix of a sales catalogue of the collection of Adriaan Vroeg, popularly known simply as the "Adumbratiunculae" among ornithologists. The authorship of the Adumbratiunculae would later be attributed to Pallas. Given the initial anonymity of the publication and the inferred authorship by external evidence, the International Code of Zoological Nomenclature advocates that Pallas's name should appear enclosed in square brackets in the species' name. Thus, the correct form of the scientific name of the European pied flycatcher is Ficedula hypoleuca ([Pallas], 1764).

Ficedula hypoleuca currently has three accepted subspecies; the nominate F. h. hypoleuca ([Pallas], 1764), F. h. iberiae (Witherby, 1928), and F. h. tomensis (Johansen, 1916). The subspecies F. h. muscipeta (Bechstein, 1792) is currently considered synonymous with F. h. hypoleuca, but could represent an actual distinct subspecies. The name F. h. atricapilla (Linnaeus, 1766) is a junior subjective synonym of F. h. hypoleuca; and the name F. h. sibirica Khakhlov, 1915 is invalid, the correct form being F. h. tomensis (Johansen, 1916). The very similar Atlas pied flycatcher (Ficedula speculigera), of the mountains of north west Africa, was formerly classed as subspecies of the European pied flycatcher.

== Description ==
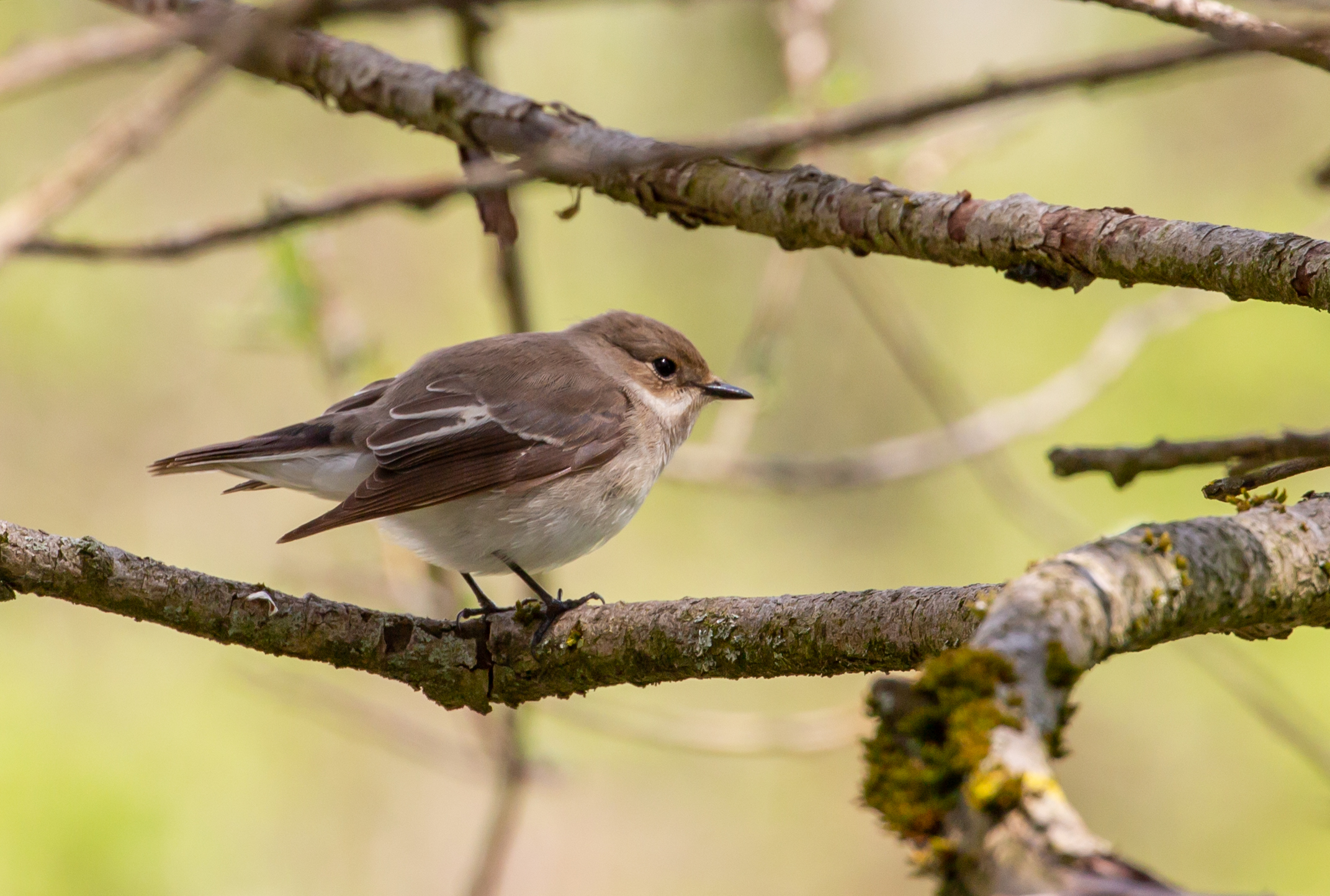
Adult female in Slovenia.

This is a 12–13.5 centimetres (4.7–5.3 in) long bird. The breeding male is mainly black above and white below, with a large white wing patch, white tail sides and a small forehead patch. The Iberian subspecies F. h. iberiae (known as Iberian pied flycatcher) has a larger forehead patch and a pale rump. Non-breeding males, females and juveniles have the black replaced by a pale brown, and may be very difficult to distinguish from other Ficedula flycatchers, particularly the collared flycatcher, with which this species hybridises to a limited extent.

The bill is black, and has the broad but pointed shape typical of aerial insectivores. As well as taking insects in flight, this species hunts caterpillars amongst the oak foliage, and will take berries. It is therefore a much earlier spring migrant than the more aerial spotted flycatcher, and its loud rhythmic and melodious song is characteristic of oak woods in spring. The contact and alarm call is a short whistle 'whit, whit, whit'.

European pied flycatcher song, Moscow oblast, Russia

They are birds of deciduous woodlands, parks and gardens, with a preference for oak trees. They build an open nest in a tree hole, and will readily adapt to an open-fronted nest box. 4–10 eggs are laid.

== Distribution and habitat ==
The European pied flycatcher has a very large range and population size, and is thus deemed to be of least concern by the IUCN. This species occupies areas of many different countries in Europe and northern Africa, also being present in the west Asian portion of Russia. More specifically, the nominate subspecies F. h. hypoleuca inhabits the UK, central Europe and Scandinavia, F. h. iberiae inhabits in the Iberian Peninsula, and F. h. tomensis in eastern Europe and Russia. The species is noted as a vagrant species in places in other countries in Africa and South Asia, such as Sudan and Afghanistan. This flycatcher typically spends winter in tropical Africa.

The European pied flycatcher is a terrestrial bird, typically inhabiting open forests, woodlands, and towns. In 2005, the European population was listed to hold 3–7 million pairs.

== Mating systems ==
The European pied flycatcher predominately practices a mixed mating system of monogamy and polygyny. Their mating system has also been described as successive polygyny. Within the latter system, the males leave their home territory once their primary mates lays their first eggs. Males then create a second territory, presumably in order to attract a secondary female to breed. Even when they succeed at acquiring a second mate, the males typically return to the first female to exclusively provide for her and her offspring. Males will sometimes care for both mates if the nests of the primary and secondary female are close together. The male may also care for both mates once the offspring of the primary female have fledged. The male bird usually does not exceed two mates, practicing bigamy. Only two cases of trigyny have been observed.

=== Sex difference in mating behaviour ===
The male mating behaviour has two key characteristics: desertion of the primary female and polyterritoriality. The males travel large distances, an average of 200–3,500 metres (660–11,480 ft), to find his second mate. After breeding with the secondary female, the males return to their first mate. The males of this species are polyterritorial; the males will acquire multiple nest sites to attract a female. Upon breeding with this first female, the male will procure more nesting sites, typically some distance from the site of the primary female, in order to attract a second female for mating. The males that have better success at polygyny are typically larger, older and more experienced at arriving earlier to the mating sites.

Polygyny threshold model graph

The female behaviour has also been studied in depth, especially due to the fact that some females accept polygyny while others are able to maintain monogamous relationships. The first female in a polygynous relationship does not suffer much in comparison to females in monogamous situations. These primary females gain greater reproductive success because they are able to secure full-time help from the male once he returns from his search for a second mate. The second female, however, often suffers from polygyny. These females have 60% less offspring than females that are in a monogamous relationship. These findings are consistent with the polygyny threshold model, which is depicted at the right. Additionally, the secondary female lays a smaller clutch which she is more likely to be able to rear on her own.

Another behaviour that is relatively frequent in European pied flycatchers is the practice of extra-pair copulations (EPC). Thus, the male practising EPC will have a group of offspring raised successfully without any parental investment on his part. The female may benefit from EPC if the second male is judged to have superior genes to the original male. Another benefit that EPC adds is that there is an increase in genetic variability. However, females are not typically very welcoming of EPC. A female that is being pursued for an EPC will either passively allow the male to copulate with her, or will resist it and risk injury due to the male's aggression.

=== Breeding dispersal ===
In an experiment conducted from 1948 to 1964 in the Forest of Dean in Gloucestershire, two hundred and fifty nest boxes were carefully recorded for their locations and then analyzed for their inhabitance. The median breeding dispersal (the distance between successive nests) of the European pied flycatcher ranges from about 52–133 metres (171–436 ft), with the average distance between nest sites being about 45 metres (148 ft). This distance typically depended on the breeding density in each year. The study found little evidence to suggest a difference in breeding dispersal between years or between monogamous and polygynous males. As a result, the data for the separate categories could be combined. The breeding dispersal over longer distances could result in both mate fidelity as well as mate change, the latter of which occurs either while the previous mate is still alive, or following the death of the mate. The breeding dispersal distances of birds that survive more than three breeding seasons were studied, and the results showed that the site fidelity increased with more successive breeding attempts. The same long-term study also found that older European pied flycatchers, both male and female, were more likely to move shorter distances between breeding seasons than younger birds were. When mates were observed to re-establish their pair bond, they tended to occupy certain areas that were near the nest site established in the previous breeding season. In addition, female birds were less likely to return to a former breeding site following the death of, or divorce from, their former partner. When a pair divorces, the females have been observed to move greater distances away than the males. As a result, females that keep the same mates from year to year end up moving shorter distances for each mating period than those that divorce. Divorce has little influence on the likelihood of males moving away from their original nest site. The study found that males that keep the same mate do not move significantly smaller distances than males that divorce.

=== Evolution of polygyny ===
Since most bird species exhibit monogamous mating behaviour, the polygynous behaviour of the European pied flycatcher has sparked much research. There are three main hypotheses that seek to explain why females settle polygynously when it lowers their overall fitness and reproductive success compared to a monogamous relationship.

==== "Sexy son" hypothesis ====
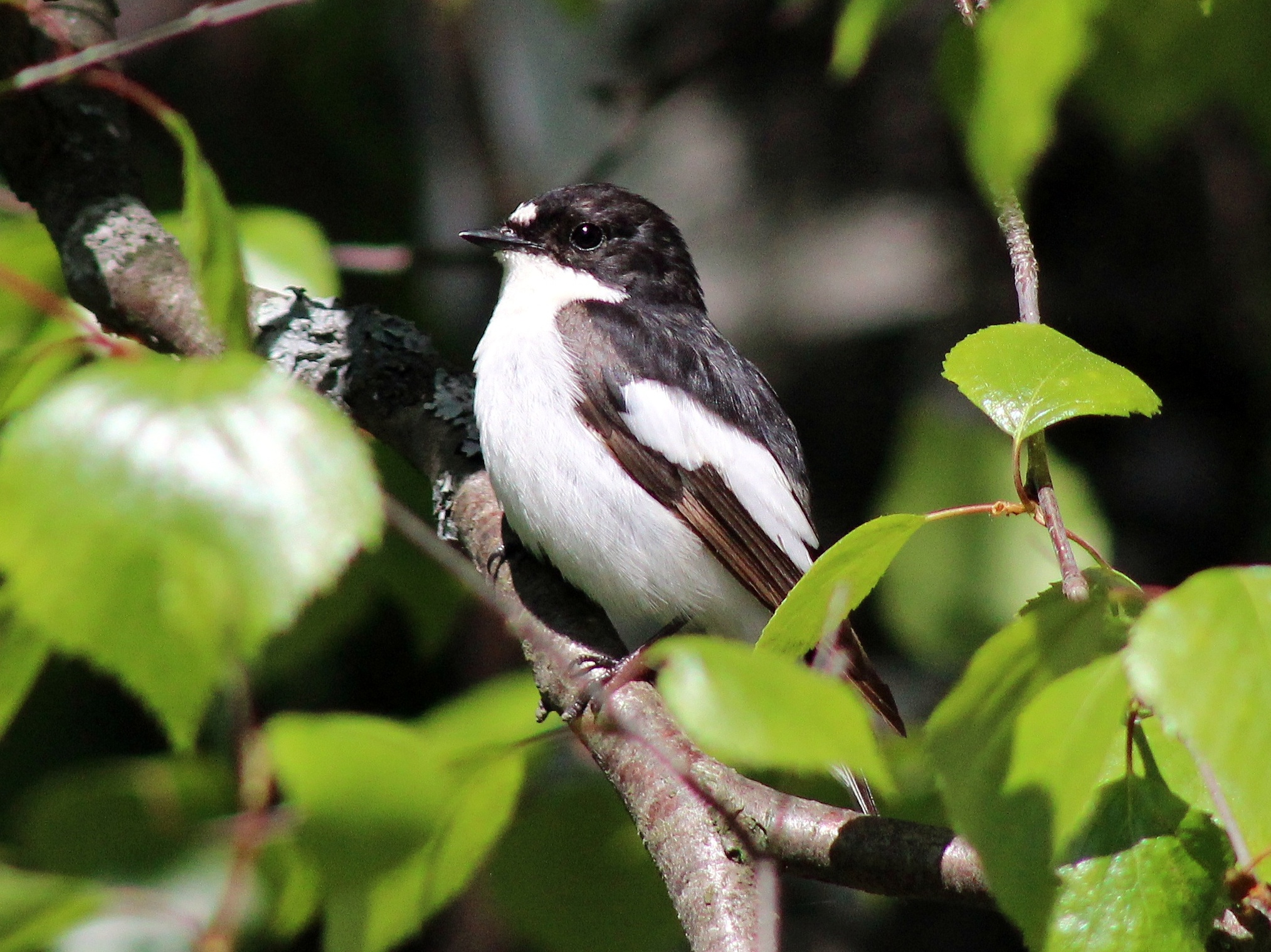
Adult male in Finland

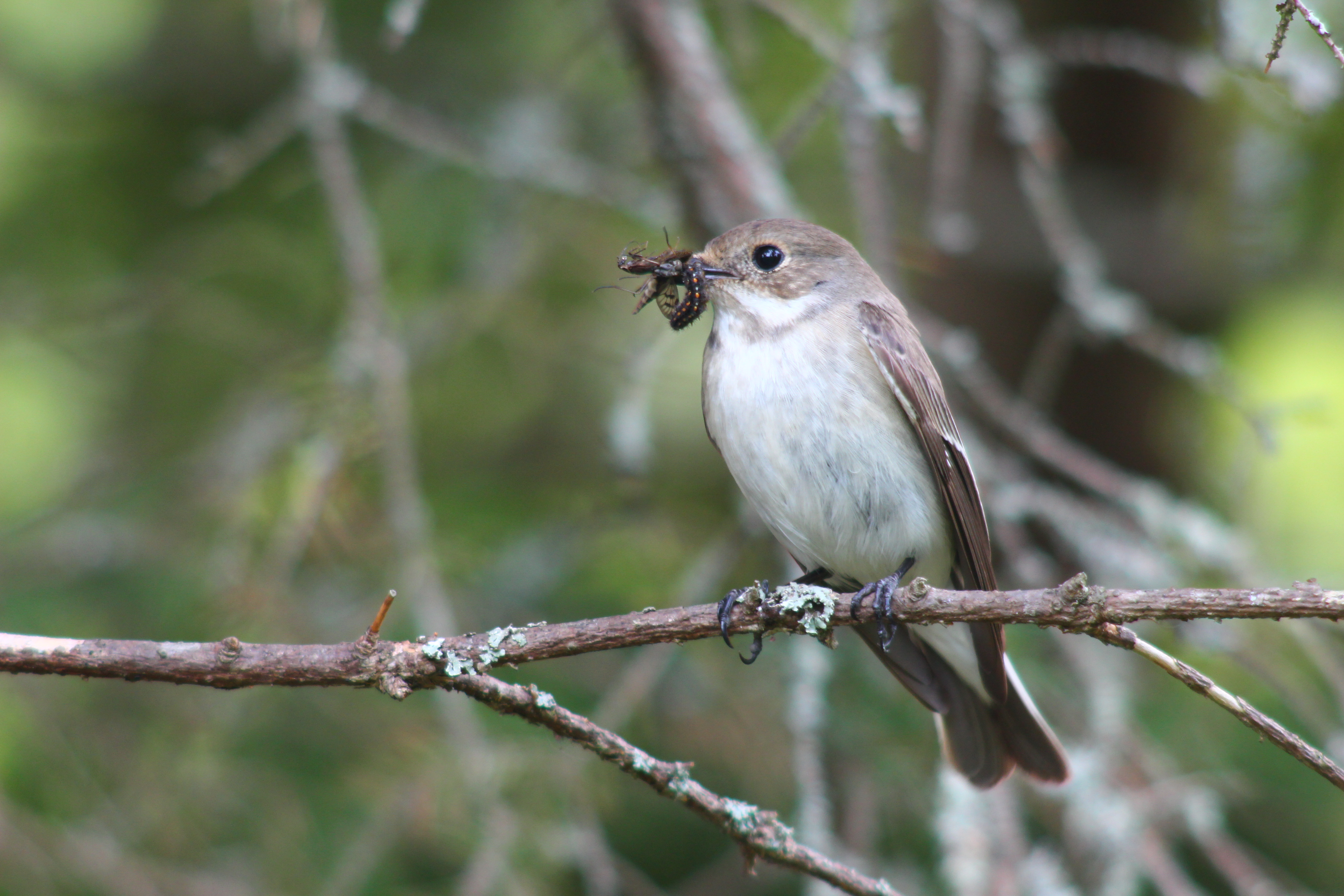
Adult female in Finland

The first hypothesis is the "sexy son" hypothesis which asserts that although females experience an initial reproductive loss with their first generation, the reproductive success of the second generation compensates for the initial loss. The second generation of males is thought to be privileged because it will inherit the increased mating ability, or attractiveness, from their fathers and thus will have high success in procuring mates upon maturation. Since these "sexy sons" are projected to have heightened reproductive success, the secondary female's reproductive success in turn improves. Some researchers, however, have refuted this theory, stating that offspring born to secondary females suffered from poor nutrition, which resulted in shorter tarsi and lower weights than the progeny of primary and monogamous females. These phenotypic traits contribute to lesser success in mate acquisition, rejecting the "sexy son" hypothesis.

==== Deception hypothesis ====
The second hypothesis claims that deception from the male flycatcher explains a female's choice to mate with an already-mated male despite the relative decrease in reproductive success. The deception arises from the polyterritoriality of the males, meaning that the males are able to deceive the females through the use of separate territories. This hypothesis attempts to describe why males have developed polyterritorial behaviour. The typical long distances between nest sites suggest that males acquire multiple nest sites to facilitate the deception of the secondary female. A study showed that females leave the male upon discovering that he is already mated, as long as she discovers this fact before laying season. However, another experiment with European pied flycatchers in Norway produced results that refute the deception hypothesis. The secondary female birds in their study raised larger clutches than primary females. The study also showed that deception is not an evolutionarily stable strategy for males, because secondary females would notice the frequent visits to the primary females and then elect to choose another mate. According to the deception hypothesis, already-mated males display polyterritorial behaviour that increases their chances of acquiring another mate. Unmated males were shown to display mating behaviour, consisting mostly of singing, at their nest site. On the other hand, already-mated males would need to disrupt their singing at their secondary territories in order to return to their primary nest. This can occur both before and after the time of their second mating. As a result, it decreases the chance that females would be deceived, leading to an evolutionarily unstable strategy.

==== Female aggression hypothesis ====
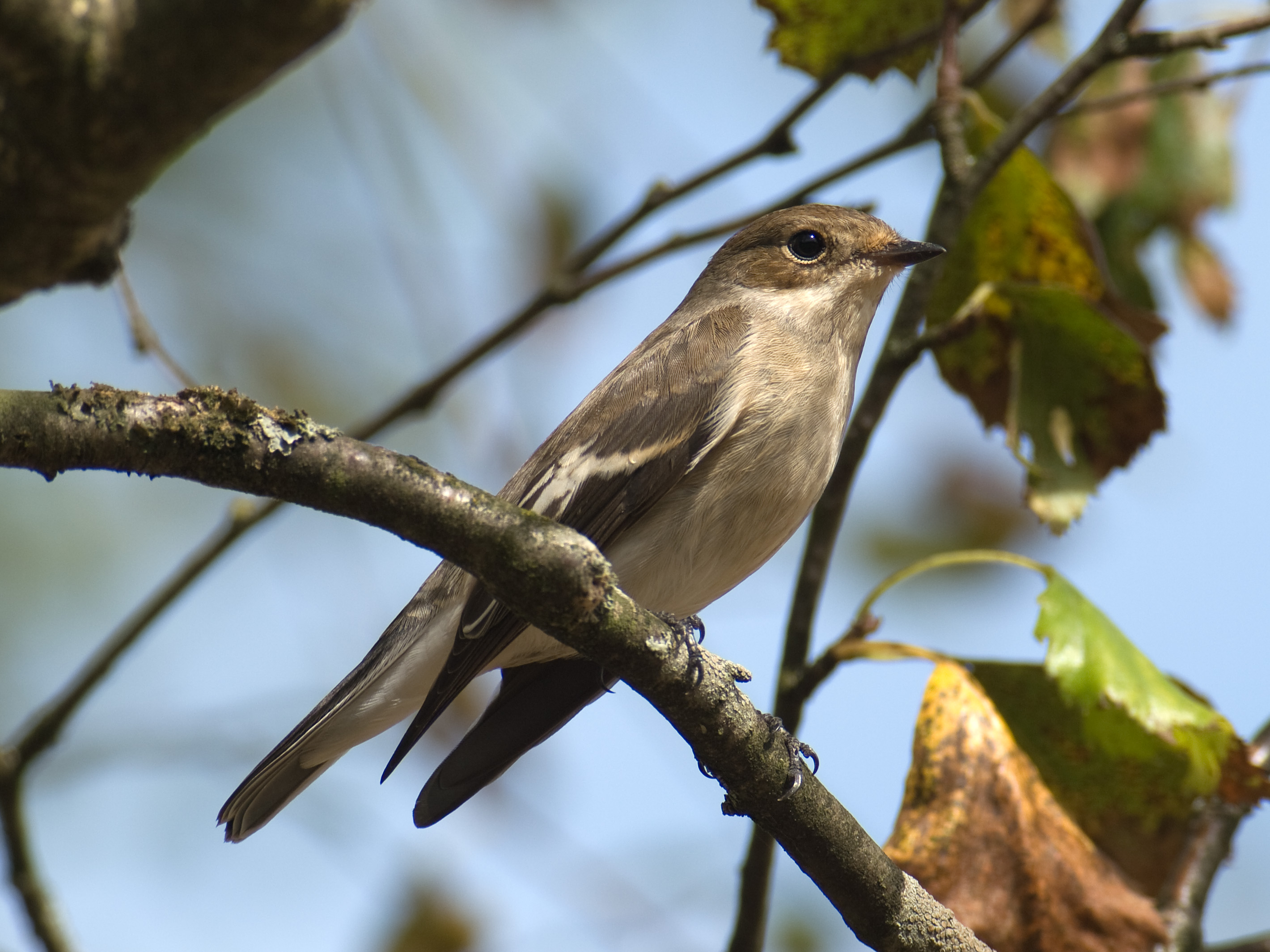
Adult female at the Kochelsee, Schlehdorf, Germany

The third hypothesis asserts that females settle for polygyny because it is hard to find unmated males. This theory assumes that there is aggression between females to find mates and asserts that polyterritoriality actually helps to alleviate this aggression, allowing the second female a place to settle and breed peacefully. Although the deception hypothesis suggests that males are more successful at farther secondary territories because they can hide their marital status, the female-female aggression suggests that males occupy distant secondary territories to reduce aggression between the primary and secondary females. Primary females display aggression and prevent other females from settling near the initial nest to ensure that they acquire the male parental care. Primary females were seen in experiments to visit the second territory and behave aggressively towards the secondary female. The number of such visits decreased with increasing distance between the nests. It is also important for the primary female to be able to detect an intruding female as soon as possible, because the longer the intruder has been present in a territory, the more difficult it will be to evict the female. Female flycatchers are known to have the capacity to identify the songs of their own mates and check if they establish a second territory. The primary male was also shown to spend less time in the second territories during incubation periods than before they acquired a secondary mate, especially with greater distances between the two territories.

=== Speciation by reinforcement ===
F. hypoleuca (pied flycatcher) and F. albicollis (collared flycatcher) are speciating from each other, providing evidence for speciation by reinforcement (selection against hybrid). The two species diverged less than two million years ago, which is considered recent on the time scale of evolution. Still, hybrids of the two species already suffer from low fertility and metabolic dysfunction. It was also believed that sexual selection causes reinforcement and pied flycatcher evolved different colouration in sympatry versus allopatry to prevent hybridisation, though some evidence suggests heterospecific competition instead of reinforcement as the underlying mechanism. Mating choice tests of the species find that females of both species choose conspecific males in sympatry, but heterospecific males in allopatry (see conspecific song preference). The patterns could suggest mimicry, driven by interspecific competition; however, song divergence has been detected that shows a similar pattern to the mating preferences.

== Parental care ==
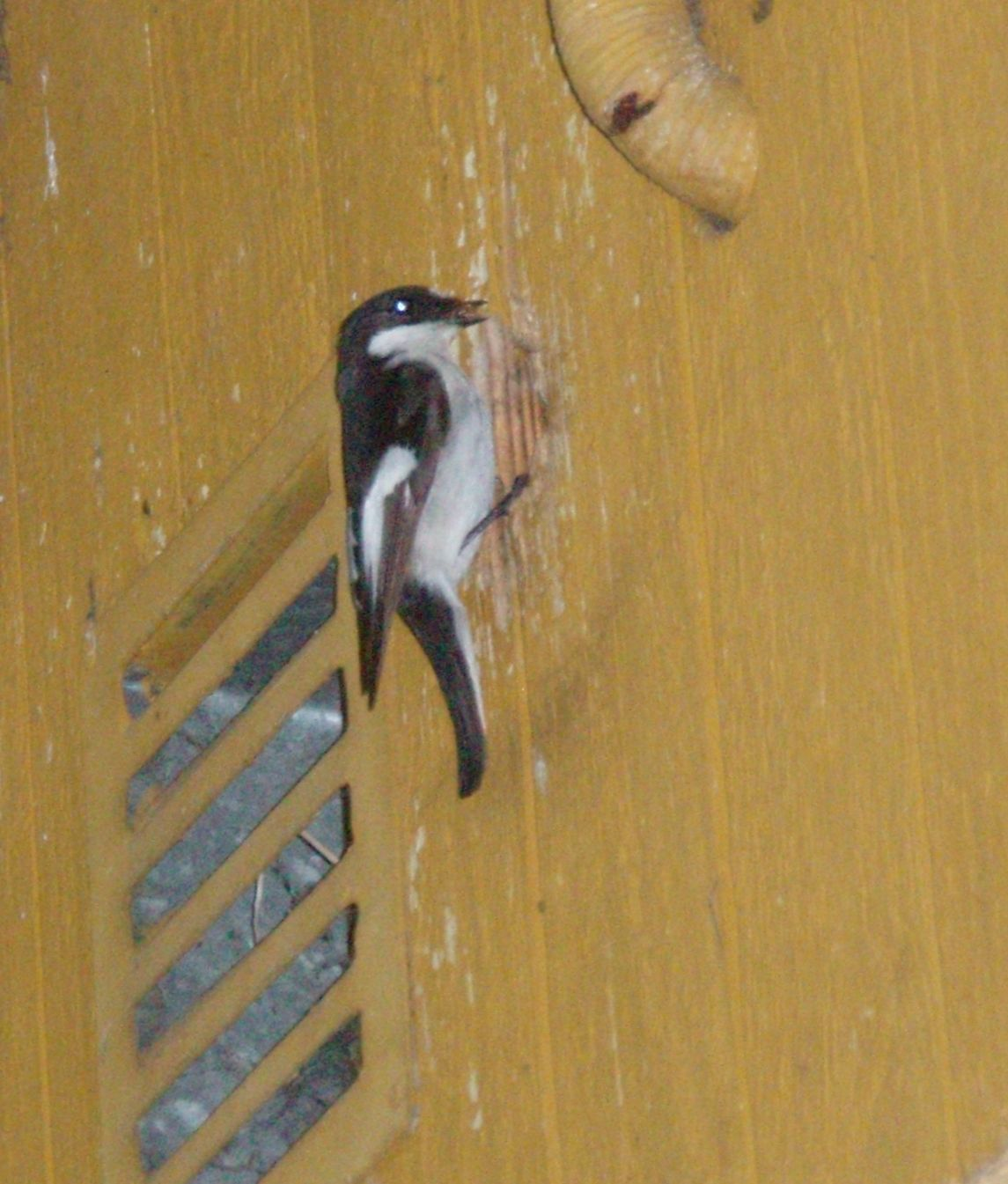
Male flycatcher returning to nest

Studies were also done to examine the amount of contribution the male European pied flycatcher provided in parental care as well as why some females choose to mate with mated males. When older and younger monogamous males were compared, there was no difference in feeding rate between each nest. When females were studied, scientists found that monogamous and primary females benefited significantly more from the male in terms of parental care than polygynous females did. The latter group could only partially compensate for the absence of a male, leading to secondary females and widows raising fewer offspring than the monogamous pairs did. In the study, differences in mates and the qualities of the territories were slight and therefore not considered, since they lead to no advantages for females to choose between the territories belonging to monogamous or already-mated males. The results of the study suggest that the males can control multiple territories and are thus able to deceive females into accepting polygyny, while the females do not have enough time to discover the marital status of the males.

In terms of male parental care to clutches, the rate of male incubation feeding was directly related to the physical condition of the males, and negatively correlated with the ambient temperature. Polygynously mated females also received far less feeds than monogamously mated females, despite having no difference in the food delivery rates by the male. The reduction in delivery rate to the polygynously mated females led to a negative effect on their incubation efficiency, because the females needed to spend more time away from the nest acquiring food. This also prolonged the incubation period when compared to monogamous females. The male feeding behaviour is related to the reproductive value as represented by the nests, as well as to the costs and benefits of incubation feeding.

== Feeding ==
The main diet of the European pied flycatcher is insects. In fact, their name comes from their habit of catching flying insects, but they also catch insects or arthropods from tree trunks, branches, or from the ground. Studies have found that the majority of food catches were made from the ground. It was also found that airborne prey were captured more during the early part of the season (May to June) than in the later part (August to September); the converse trend appeared in prey taken from trees. There are also many overlaps in the foraging techniques with the collared flycatcher, the spotted flycatcher, and the common redstart.

Courtship feeding, or incubation feeding, occurs when the male feeds the female in the pairing, egglaying stages, and incubation. An interpretation of this behaviour is that it strengthens the pair bond between mates.

=== Diet ===
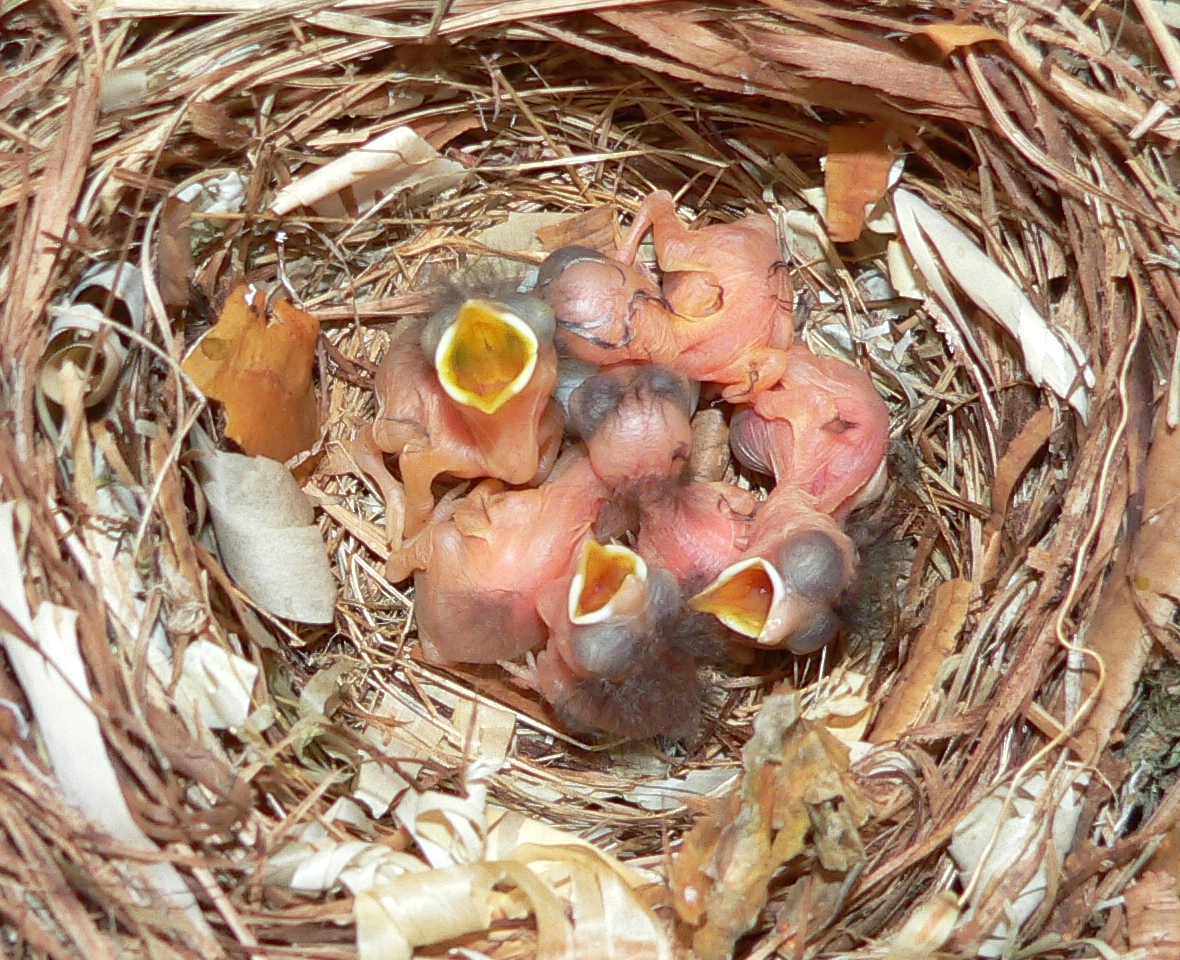
Pied flycatcher chicks

The diet of the European pied flycatcher is composed nearly entirely of insects. One study analyzed the stomach contents of birds during the breeding season and found that ants, bees, wasps and beetles made up the main diet. Ants made up approximately 25% of the diet. Food given to nestlings include spiders, butterflies, moths, flies, mosquitoes, ants, bees, wasps, and beetles. For Lepidoptera and Hymenoptera, larvae appear to be consumed more than adult insects; the opposite is true for other insect orders. There is also variation between the proportions of larvae and adult insects between different habitats. Nestlings were also found to consume more spiders, butterfly, and moth larvae, while adult flycatchers consume more ants.

== Status ==
It has on average decreased in population by 25% within the last 25 years. It has ceased to breed in several parts of its former range within Britain. It is a very rare and irregular breeder in Ireland, with only one or two pairs recorded as breeding in most years. Records of its location can be found on that National Biodiversity Network. In the Netherlands it has declined by 90% due to nestling peaks mistiming.

=== Lifecycle ===
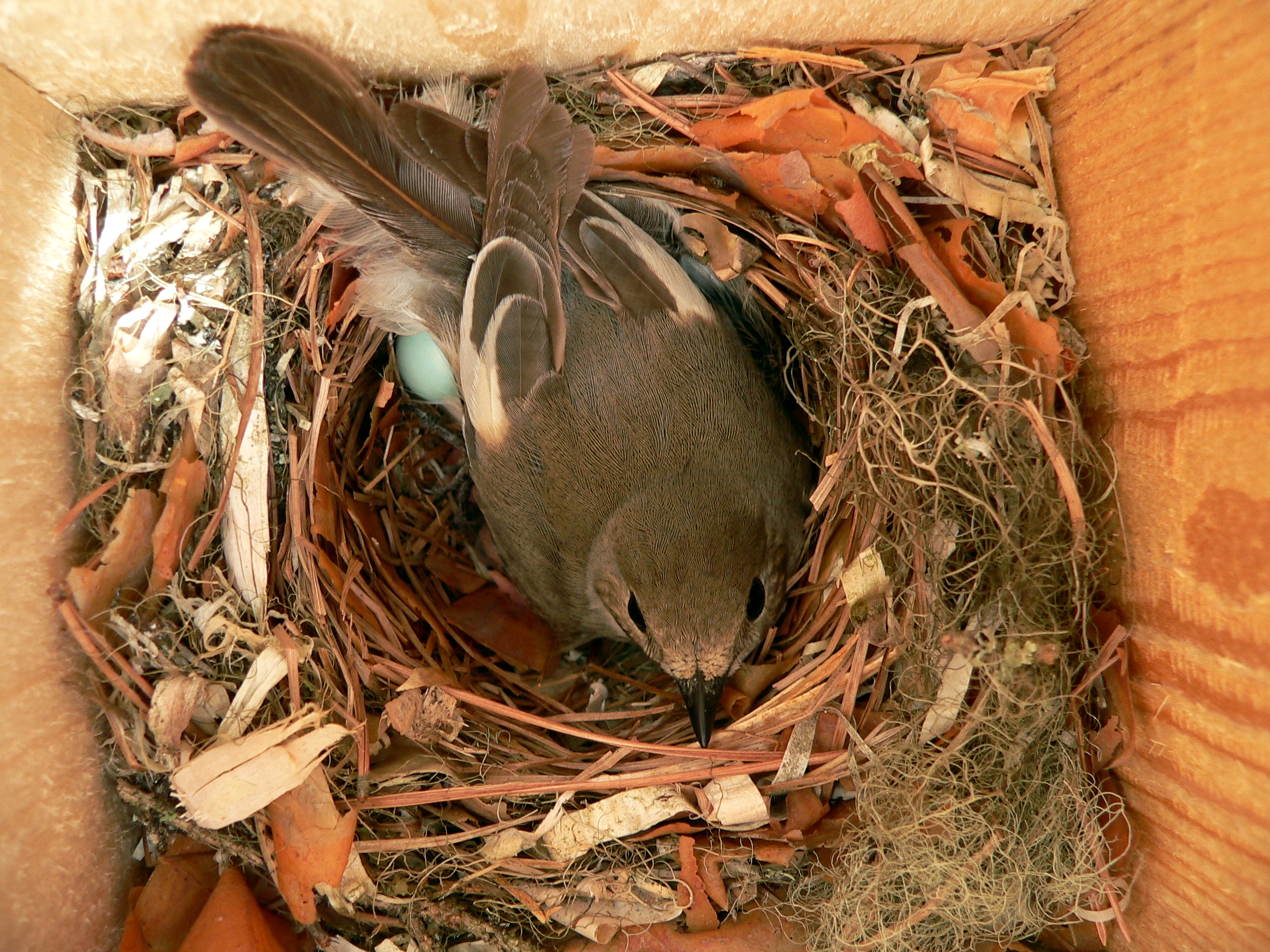
Female in a nestbox in Finland

- mid-September to mid-April: lives in sub Saharan Africa
- mid April to end of May: migrates and arrives in countries such as the United Kingdom
- June to August: breeding season, one brood only
- August to mid September: flies back to sub Saharan Africa

=== Management and conservation ===
They breed in upland broadleaf woodland. This means that in Britain they are limited due to geography to the North and West. They prefer mature oak woodland, but also breed in mature upland ash and birch woods.

They require very high horizontal visibility - a low abundance of shrub and understorey, but with high proportion of moss and grass. Grazing needs to be managed to maintain this open character, but also allow the occasional replacement trees.

They will sometimes use mature open conifer woodland where natural tree holes occur. Generally they prefer trees that have tree holes, i.e. dead trees, or dead limbs on healthy trees. They also like lichens that grow on trees.

==== Grant funding for conservation ====
The Forestry Commission offers grants under a scheme called England's Woodland Improvement Grant (EWIG); as does Natural England's Environmental Stewardship Scheme.
