= List of birds of Metropolitan France =

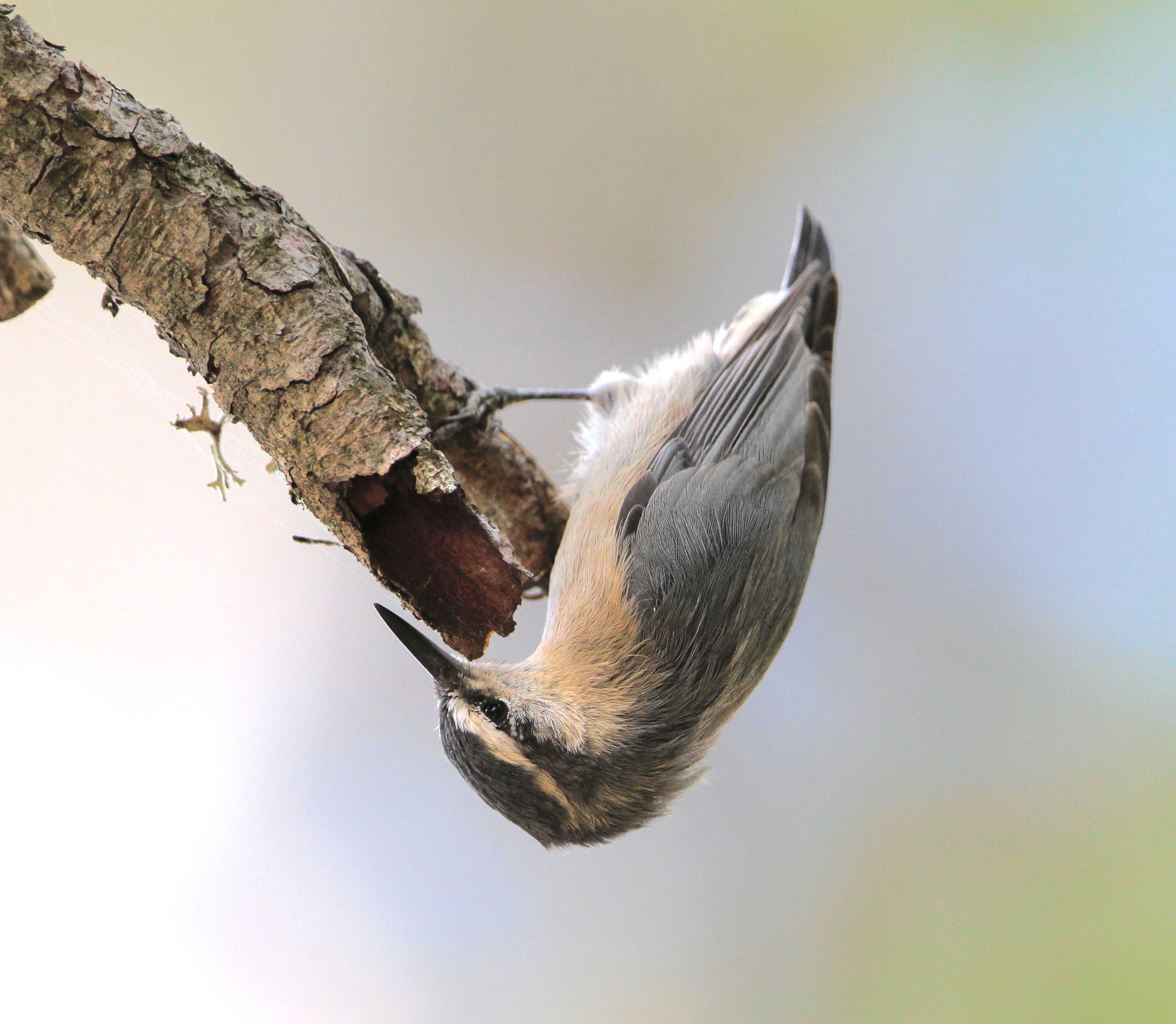
Corsican nuthatch, France's only endemic species

This list of birds species recorded in Metropolitan France. The avifauna of France includes a total of 671 species according to the Birds of France website (oiseaux.net). One is endemic to the island of Corsica.

Metropolitan France is the French mainland, adjacent islands, and Corsica. There is also a specific list for the birds of Corsica. For the birds in the French Overseas territories, see: List of birds of French Guiana, List of birds of French Polynesia, List of birds of Guadeloupe, List of birds of Martinique, List of birds of Réunion, and List of birds of Saint Pierre and Miquelon.

This list's taxonomic treatment (designation and sequence of orders, families and species) and nomenclature (English and scientific names) are those of the IOC World Bird List, Version 14.2 (2024).

Bird species admitted to the French List are included in the following categories A, B or C, with the same definitions as the British and other Western Palaearctic bird lists. These are sourced from the 2021 edition of the French list, which followed the IOC World Bird List, Version 11.1 (2021).

- A: species that have been recorded in an apparently natural state at least once since 1 January 1950.
- B: species that were recorded in an apparently natural state at least once between 1 January 1800 and 31 December 1949, but have not been recorded subsequently.
- C: species introduced by humans, and have established breeding populations derived from introduced stock, which maintain themselves without necessary recourse to further introduction.

== Ducks, geese, and waterfowl ==
Order: Anseriformes Family: Anatidae

Anatidae includes the ducks and most duck-like waterfowl, such as geese and swans. These birds are adapted to an aquatic existence with webbed feet, flattened bills, and feathers that are excellent at shedding water due to an oily coating.

- Fulvous whistling duck Dendrocygna bicolor (French: dendrocygne fauve) – C
- Brant Branta bernicla (French: bernache cravant) – A
- Red-breasted goose Branta ruficollis (French: bernache à cou roux) – A
- Canada goose Branta canadensis (French: bernache du Canada) – C
- Barnacle goose Branta leucopsis (French: bernache nonnette) – AC
- Cackling goose Branta hutchinsii (French: bernache de Hutchins) – A
- Snow goose Anser caerulescens (French: oie des neiges) – B
- Greylag goose Anser anser (French: oie cendrée) – AC
- Taiga bean goose Anser fabalis (French: oie des moissons) – A
- Pink-footed goose Anser brachyrhynchus (French: oie à bec court) – A
- Tundra bean goose Anser serrirostris (French: oie de la toundra) – A
- Greater white-fronted goose Anser albifrons (French: oie rieuse) – A
- Lesser white-fronted goose Anser erythropus (French: oie naine) – A
- Mute swan Cygnus olor (French: cygne tuberculé) – AC
- Black swan Cygnus atratus (French: cygne noir) – C
- Tundra swan Cygnus columbianus (French: cygne siffleur) – A
- Whooper swan Cygnus cygnus (French: cygne chanteur) – A
- Egyptian goose Alopochen aegyptiaca (French: ouette d'Egypte) – BC
- Common shelduck Tadorna tadorna (French: tadorne de Belon) – A
- Ruddy shelduck Tadorna ferruginea (French: tadorne casarca) – BC
- Mandarin duck Aix galericulata (French: canard mandarin) – C
- Baikal teal Sibirionetta formosa (French: sarcelle élégante) – B
- Garganey Spatula querquedula (French: sarcelle d'été) – A
- Blue-winged teal Spatula discors (French: sarcelle à ailes bleues) – A
- Northern shoveler Spatula clypeata (French: canard souchet) – A
- Gadwall Mareca strepera (French: canard chipeau) – A
- Falcated duck Mareca falcata (French: canard à faucilles) – A
- Eurasian wigeon Mareca penelope (French: canard siffleur) – A
- American wigeon Mareca americana (French: canard d'Amérique) – A
- Mallard Anas platyrhynchos (French: canard colvert) – AC
- American black duck Anas rubripes (French: canard noir) – A
- Northern pintail Anas acuta (French: canard pilet) – A
- Eurasian teal Anas crecca (French: sarcelle d'hiver) – A
- Green-winged teal Anas carolinensis (French: sarcelle à ailes vertes) – A
- Marbled duck Marmaronetta angustirostris (French: sarcelle marbrée) – A
- Red-crested pochard Netta rufina (French: nette rousse) – A
- Canvasback Aythya valisineria (French: fuligule à dos blanc) – A
- Redhead Aythya americana (French: fuligule à tête rouge) – A
- Common pochard Aythya ferina (French: fuligule milouin) – A
- Ferruginous duck Aythya nyroca (French: fuligule nyroca) – A
- Ring-necked duck Aythya collaris (French: fuligule à bec cerclé) – A
- Tufted duck Aythya fuligula (French: fuligule morillon) – A
- Greater scaup Aythya marila (French: fuligule milouinan) – A
- Lesser scaup Aythya affinis (French: fuligule à tête noire) – A
- Steller's eider Polysticta stelleri (French: eider de Steller) – A
- King eider Somateria spectabilis (French: eider à tête grise) – A
- Common eider Somateria mollissima (French: eider à duvet) – A
- Harlequin duck Histrionicus histrionicus (French: arlequin plongeur) – A
- Surf scoter Melanitta perspicillata (French: macreuse à front blanc) – A
- Velvet scoter Melanitta fusca (French: macreuse brune) – A
- Stejneger's scoter Melanitta stejnegeri (French: macreuse de Sibérie) – B
- Common scoter Melanitta nigra (French: macreuse noire) – A
- Black scoter Melanitta americana (French: macreuse à bec jaune) – A
- Long-tailed duck Clangula hyemalis (French: harelde boréal) – A
- Bufflehead Bucephala albeola (French: garrot albéole) – A
- Common goldeneye Bucephala clangula (French: garrot à oeil d'or) – A
- Barrow's goldeneye Bucephala islandica (French: garrot d'Islande) – A
- Smew Mergellus albellus (French: harle piette) – A
- Hooded merganser Lophodytes cucullatus (French: harle couronné) – A
- Goosander Mergus merganser (French: harle bièvre) – A
- Red-breasted merganser Mergus serrator (French: harle huppé) – A
- Ruddy duck Oxyura jamaicensis (French: érismature rousse) – C
- White-headed duck Oxyura leucocephala (French: érismature à tête blanche) – A

== New World quail ==
Order: Galliformes Family: Odontophoridae

The New World quails are small, plump terrestrial birds only distantly related to the quails of the Old World. Two have been introduced to France as gamebirds.

- California quail Callipepla californica (French: colin de Californie) – C
- Northern bobwhite Colinus virginianus (French: colin de Virginie) – C

== Pheasants, grouse, and allies ==
Order: Galliformes Family: Phasianidae

These are terrestrial species of gamebirds, feeding and nesting on the ground. They are variable in size but generally plump, with broad and relatively short wings. In addition to the native species, several have been introduced for game shooting.

- Hazel grouse Tetrastes bonasia (French: gélinotte des bois) – A
- Rock ptarmigan Lagopus muta (French: lagopède alpin) – A
- Western capercaillie Tetrao urogallus (French: grand tétras) – A
- Black grouse Lyrurus tetrix (French: tétras lyre) – A
- Grey partridge Perdix perdix (French: perdrix grise) – AC
- Reeves's pheasant Syrmaticus reevesii (French: faisan vénéré) – C
- Common pheasant Phasianus colchicus (French: faisan de Colchide) – C
- Common quail Coturnix coturnix (French: caille des blés) – A
- Barbary partridge Alectoris barbara (French: perdrix gambra) – C
- Red-legged partridge Alectoris rufa (French: perdrix rouge) – AC
- Chukar partridge Alectoris chukar (French: perdrix choukar) – C
- Rock partridge Alectoris graeca (French: perdrix bartavelle) – A

== Nightjars and allies ==
Order: Caprimulgiformes Family: Caprimulgidae

Nightjars are medium-sized nocturnal birds that usually nest on the ground. They have long wings, short legs, and very short bills. Most have small feet, of little use for walking, and long pointed wings. Their soft plumage is camouflaged to resemble bark or leaves.

- Common nighthawk Chordeiles minor (French: engoulevent d'Amérique) – A
- Red-necked nightjar Caprimulgus ruficollis (French: engoulevent à collier roux) – A
- European nightjar Caprimulgus europaeus (French: engoulevent d'Europe) – A

== Swifts ==
Order: Caprimulgiformes Family: Apodidae

Swifts are small birds which spend the majority of their lives flying. These birds have very short legs and never settle voluntarily on the ground, perching instead only on vertical surfaces. Many swifts have long swept-back wings which resemble a crescent.

- Chimney swift Chaetura pelagica (French: martinet ramoneur) – A
- Alpine swift Tachymarptis melba (French: martinet à ventre blanc) – A
- Common swift Apus apus (French: martinet noir) – A
- Pallid swift Apus pallidus (French: martinet pâle) – A
- Little swift Apus affinis (French: martinet des maisons) – A
- White-rumped swift Apus caffer (French: martinet cafre) – A

== Bustards ==
Order: Otidiformes Family: Otididae

Bustards are large terrestrial birds mainly associated with dry open country and steppes in the Old World. They are omnivorous and nest on the ground. They walk steadily on strong legs and big toes, pecking for food as they go. They have long broad wings with "fingered" wingtips and striking patterns in flight. Many have interesting mating displays.

- Great bustard Otis tarda (French: grande outarde) – A
- Macqueen's bustard Chlamydotis macqueenii (French: outarde de Macqueen) – B
- Little bustard Tetrax tetrax (French: outarde canepetière) – A

== Cuckoos ==
Order: Cuculiformes Family: Cuculidae

The family Cuculidae includes cuckoos, roadrunners, and anis. These birds are of variable size with slender bodies, long tails, and strong legs. The Old World cuckoos are brood parasites.

- Great spotted cuckoo Clamator glandarius (French: coucou geai) – A
- Yellow-billed cuckoo Coccyzus americanus (French: coulicou à bec jaune) – A
- Black-billed cuckoo Coccyzus erythropthalmus (French: coulicou à bec noir) – A
- Common cuckoo Cuculus canorus (French: coucou gris) – A

== Sandgrouse ==
Order: Pterocliformes Family: Pteroclidae

Sandgrouse have small pigeon-like heads and necks, but sturdy compact bodies. They have long pointed wings and sometimes tails and a fast direct flight. Flocks fly to watering holes at dawn and dusk. Their legs are feathered down to the toes.

- Pallas's sandgrouse Syrrhaptes paradoxus (French: syrrhapte paradoxal) – A
- Pin-tailed sandgrouse Pterocles alchata (French: ganga cata) – A

== Pigeons and doves ==
Order: Columbiformes Family: Columbidae

Pigeons and doves are stout-bodied birds with short necks and short slender bills with a fleshy cere.

- Rock dove Columba livia (French: pigeon biset) – AC
- Stock dove Columba oenas (French: pigeon colombin) – A
- Common wood pigeon Columba palumbus (French: pigeon ramier) – A
- European turtle dove Streptopelia turtur (French: tourterelle des bois) – A
- Oriental turtle dove Streptopelia orientalis (French: tourterelle orientale) – A
- Eurasian collared dove Streptopelia decaocto (French: tourterelle turque) – A
- Laughing dove Spilopelia senegalensis (French: tourterelle maillée) – C
- Mourning dove Zenaida macroura (French: tourterelle triste) – A

== Rails, gallinules, and coots ==
Order: Gruiformes Family: Rallidae

Rallidae is a large family of small to medium-sized birds which includes the rails, crakes, coots, and moorhens. Typically they inhabit dense vegetation in damp environments near lakes, swamps, or rivers. Many are shy and secretive birds, but some are bold and conspicuous. Most species have strong legs and long toes which are well adapted to soft uneven surfaces. They tend to have short, rounded wings and appear to be to be weak fliers, though many are capable of long-distance migration.

- Water rail Rallus aquaticus (French: râle d'eau) – A
- Corn crake Crex crex (French: râle des genêts) – A
- Sora Porzana carolina (French: marouette de Caroline) – A
- Spotted crake Porzana porzana (French: marouette ponctuée) – A
- Lesser moorhen Paragallinula angulata (French: gallinule africaine) – A
- Common moorhen Gallinula chloropus (French: gallinule poule d'eau) – A
- Eurasian coot Fulica atra (French: foulque macroule) – A
- Red-knobbed coot Fulica cristata (French: foulque caronculée) – B
- Allen's gallinule Porphyrio alleni (French: talève d'Allen) – A
- Western swamphen Porphyrio porphyrio (French: talève sultane) – AC
- Grey-headed swamphen Porphyrio poliocephalus (French: talève à tête grise) – C
- Baillon's crake Zapornia pusilla (French: marouette de Baillon) – A
- Little crake Zapornia parva (French: marouette poussin) – A

== Cranes ==
Order: Gruiformes Family: Gruidae

Cranes are large, long-legged, and long-necked birds. Unlike the similar-looking but unrelated herons, cranes fly with necks outstretched, not pulled back. Most have elaborate and noisy courting displays or "dances".

- Sandhill crane Antigone canadensis (French: grue du Canada) – A
- Demoiselle crane Grus virgo (French: grue demoiselle) – A
- Common crane Grus grus (French: grue cendrée) – A

== Grebes ==
Order: Podicipediformes Family: Podicipedidae

Grebes are small to medium-large freshwater diving birds. They have lobed toes and are excellent swimmers and divers. However, they have their feet placed far back on the body, making them quite ungainly on land.

- Little grebe Tachybaptus ruficollis (French: grèbe castagneux) – A
- Pied-billed grebe Podilymbus podiceps (French: grèbe à bec bigarré) – A
- Red-necked grebe Podiceps grisegena (French: grèbe jougris) – A
- Great crested grebe Podiceps cristatus (French: grèbe huppé) – A
- Slavonian grebe Podiceps auritus (French: grèbe esclavon) – A
- Black-necked grebe Podiceps nigricollis (French: grèbe à cou noir) – A

== Flamingos ==
Order: Phoenicopteriformes Family: Phoenicopteridae

Flamingos are gregarious warm temperate to tropical wetland birds, usually 1 to 1.5 metres (3 ft 3 in to 4 ft 11 in) high, found in both the Western and Eastern Hemispheres. Flamingos filter-feed on shrimps and algae. Their oddly shaped beaks are specially adapted to separate mud and silt from the food they consume and, uniquely, are used upside-down.

- Greater flamingo Phoenicopterus roseus (French: flamant rose) – A
- Lesser flamingo Phoeniconaias minor (French: flamant nain) – A

== Buttonquail ==
Order: Charadriiformes Family: Turnicidae

The buttonquail are small, drab, running birds which superficially resemble quail. The female is the brighter of the sexes and initiates courtship. The male incubates the eggs and tends the young. One species is cited on the current French list, but without details.

- Common buttonquail Turnix sylvaticus (French: turnix mugissant) – ?

== Stone-curlews ==
Order: Charadriiformes Family: Burhinidae

The stone-curlews, also called thick-knees, are a group of waders found worldwide within the tropical zone, with some species also breeding in temperate Europe and Australia. They are medium to large waders with strong black or yellow-black bills, large yellow eyes, and cryptic plumage. Despite being classed as waders, most species have a preference for arid or semi-arid habitats.

- Eurasian stone-curlew Burhinus oedicnemus (French: œdicnème criard) – A

== Oystercatchers ==
Order: Charadriiformes Family: Haematopodidae

The oystercatchers are large and noisy plover-like birds, with strong bills used for smashing or prising open molluscs.

- Eurasian oystercatcher Haematopus ostralegus (French: huîtrier pie) – A

== Stilts and avocets ==
Order: Charadriiformes Family: Recurvirostridae

Recurvirostridae is a family of large wading birds which includes the avocets and stilts. The avocets have long legs and long up-curved bills. The stilts have extremely long legs and long, thin, straight bills.

- Black-winged stilt Himantopus himantopus (French: échasse blanche) – A
- Pied avocet Recurvirostra avosetta (French: avocette élégante) – A

== Plovers and lapwings ==
Order: Charadriiformes Family: Charadriidae

The family Charadriidae includes the plovers, dotterel, and lapwings. They are small to medium-sized birds with compact bodies, short thick necks, and long, usually pointed, wings. They are found in open country worldwide, mostly in habitats near water.

- Grey plover Pluvialis squatarola (French: pluvier argenté) – A
- European golden plover Pluvialis apricaria (French: pluvier doré) – A
- Pacific golden plover Pluvialis fulva (French: pluvier fauve) – A
- American golden plover Pluvialis dominica (French: pluvier bronzé) – A
- Eurasian dotterel Charadrius morinellus (French: pluvier guignard) – A
- Killdeer Charadrius vociferus (French: pluvier kildir) – A
- Common ringed plover Charadrius hiaticula (French: pluvier grand-gravelot) – A
- Semipalmated plover Charadrius semipalmatus (French: pluvier grand-semipalmé) – A
- Little ringed plover Charadrius dubius (French: pluvier petit-gravelot) – A
- Northern lapwing Vanellus vanellus (French: vanneau huppé) – A
- Spur-winged lapwing Vanellus spinosus (French: vanneau éperonné) – A
- Sociable lapwing Vanellus gregarius (French: vanneau sociable) – A
- White-tailed lapwing Vanellus leucurus (French: vanneau à queue blanche) – A
- Caspian plover Anarhynchus asiaticus (French: pluvier asiatique) – A
- Siberian sand plover Anarhynchus mongolus (French: pluvier de Mongolie) – A
- Greater sand plover Anarhynchus leschenaultii (French: pluvier de Leschenault) – A
- Kittlitz's plover Anarhynchus pecuarius (French: pluvier pâtre) – A
- Kentish plover Anarhynchus alexandrinus (French: pluvier à collier interrompu) – A

== Sandpipers and allies ==
Order: Charadriiformes Family: Scolopacidae

Scolopacidae is a large diverse family of small to medium-sized waders including the sandpipers, curlews, godwits, shanks, woodcock, snipe, dowitchers, and phalaropes. The majority of these species eat small invertebrates picked out of the mud or soil. Variation in length of legs and bills enables multiple species to feed in the same habitat, particularly on the coast, without direct competition for food.

- Upland sandpiper Bartramia longicauda (French: maubèche des champs) – A
- Eurasian whimbrel Numenius phaeopus (French: courlis corlieu) – A
- Hudsonian whimbrel Numenius hudsonicus (French: courlis hudsonien) – A
- Slender-billed curlew Numenius tenuirostris (French: courlis à bec grêle) – A
- Eurasian curlew Numenius arquata (French: courlis cendré) – A
- Bar-tailed godwit Limosa lapponica (French: barge rousse) – A
- Black-tailed godwit Limosa limosa (French: barge à queue noire) – A
- Long-billed dowitcher Limnodromus scolopaceus (French: bécassin à long bec) – A
- Short-billed dowitcher Limnodromus griseus (French: bécassin roux) – A
- Jack snipe Lymnocryptes minimus (French: bécassine sourde) – A
- American woodcock Scolopax minor (French: bécasse d'Amérique) – A
- Eurasian woodcock Scolopax rusticola (French: bécasse des bois) – A
- Great snipe Gallinago media (French: bécassine double) – A
- Common snipe Gallinago gallinago (French: bécassine des marais) – A
- Wilson's snipe Gallinago delicata (French: bécassine de Wilson) – A
- Wilson's phalarope Phalaropus tricolor (French: phalarope de Wilson) – A
- Red phalarope Phalaropus fulicaria (French: phalarope à bec large) – A
- Red-necked phalarope Phalaropus lobatus (French: phalarope à bec étroit) – A
- Terek sandpiper Xenus cinereus (French: chevalier bargette) – A
- Common sandpiper Actitis hypoleucos (French: chevalier guignette) – A
- Spotted sandpiper Actitis macularius (French: chevalier grivelé) – A
- Green sandpiper Tringa ochropus (French: chevalier cul-blanc) – A
- Solitary sandpiper Tringa solitaria (French: chevalier solitaire) – A
- Grey-tailed tattler Tringa brevipes (French: chevalier de Sibérie) – A
- Marsh sandpiper Tringa stagnatilis (French: chevalier stagnatile) – A
- Wood sandpiper Tringa glareola (French: chevalier sylvain) – A
- Common redshank Tringa totanus (French: chevalier gambette) – A
- Lesser yellowlegs Tringa flavipes (French: chevalier à pattes jaunes) – A
- Willet Tringa semipalmata (French: chevalier semipalmé) – A
- Spotted redshank Tringa erythropus (French: chevalier arlequin) – A
- Common greenshank Tringa nebularia (French: chevalier aboyeur) – A
- Greater yellowlegs Tringa melanoleuca (French: chevalier criard) – A
- Ruddy turnstone Arenaria interpres (French: tournepierre à collier) – A
- Red knot Calidris canutus (French: bécasseau maubèche) – A
- Ruff Calidris pugnax (French: combattant varié) – A
- Broad-billed sandpiper Calidris falcinellus (French: bécasseau falcinelle) – A
- Sharp-tailed sandpiper Calidris acuminata (French: bécasseau à queue pointue) – A
- Stilt sandpiper Calidris himantopus (French: bécasseau à échasses) – A
- Curlew sandpiper Calidris ferruginea (French: bécasseau cocorli) – A
- Temminck's stint Calidris temminckii (French: bécasseau de Temminck) – A
- Long-toed stint Calidris subminuta (French: bécasseau à longs doigts) – A
- Red-necked stint Calidris ruficollis (French: bécasseau à cou roux) – A
- Buff-breasted sandpiper Calidris subruficollis (French: bécasseau rousset) – A
- Sanderling Calidris alba (French: bécasseau sanderling) – A
- Dunlin Calidris alpina (French: bécasseau variable) – A
- Purple sandpiper Calidris maritima (French: bécasseau violet) – A
- Baird's sandpiper Calidris bairdii (French: bécasseau de Baird) – A
- Little stint Calidris minuta (French: bécasseau minute) – A
- Least sandpiper Calidris minutilla (French: bécasseau minuscule) – A
- White-rumped sandpiper Calidris fuscicollis (French: bécasseau à croupion blanc) – A
- Pectoral sandpiper Calidris melanotos (French: bécasseau tacheté) – A
- Western sandpiper Calidris mauri (French: bécasseau d'Alaska) – A
- Semipalmated sandpiper Calidris pusilla (French: bécasseau semipalmé) – A

== Pratincoles and coursers ==
Order: Charadriiformes Family: Glareolidae

Glareolidae is a family of wading birds comprising the pratincoles, which have short legs, long pointed wings, and long forked tails, and the coursers, which have long legs, short wings, and pointed bills which curve downwards.

- Cream-coloured courser Cursorius cursor (French: courvite isabelle) – A
- Oriental pratincole Glareola maldivarum (French: glaréole orientale) – A
- Black-winged pratincole Glareola nordmanni (French: glaréole à ailes noires) – A
- Collared pratincole Glareola pratincola (French: glaréole à collier) – A

== Gulls, terns, and skimmers ==
Order: Charadriiformes Family: Laridae

Laridae is a family of medium to large seabirds and includes gulls and terns. Gulls are typically grey and white, often with black markings on the head and wingtips. They have stout, longish, bills and webbed feet. Terns are a group of generally small to medium seabirds typically with grey and white plumage, often with black cap on the head, but more extensive black in some species. Most terns hunt fish by diving but some pick insects off the surface of fresh water. Gulls and terns are generally long-lived birds, with several species known to live in excess of 30 years.

- Sooty tern Onychoprion fuscatus (French: sterne fuligineuse) – A
- Bridled tern Onychoprion anaethetus (French: sterne bridée) – A
- Little tern Sternula albifrons (French: sterne naine) – A
- Gull-billed tern Gelochelidon nilotica (French: sterne hansel) – A
- Caspian tern Hydroprogne caspia (French: sterne caspienne) – A
- Whiskered tern Chlidonias hybrida (French: guifette moustac) – A
- Black tern Chlidonias niger (French: guifette noire) – A
- White-winged tern Chlidonias leucopterus (French: guifette leucoptère) – A
- Forster's tern Sterna forsteri (French: sterne de Forster) – A
- Arctic tern Sterna paradisaea (French: sterne arctique) – A
- Common tern Sterna hirundo (French: sterne pierregarin) – A
- Roseate tern Sterna dougallii (French: sterne de Dougall) – A
- Sandwich tern Thalasseus sandvicensis (French: sterne caugek) – A
- Elegant tern Thalasseus elegans (French: sterne élégante) – A
- Lesser crested tern Thalasseus bengalensis (French: sterne voyageuse) – A
- West African crested tern Thalasseus albididorsalis (French: sterne d'Afrique) – A
- Royal tern Thalasseus maximus (French: sterne royale) – A
- Little gull Hydrocoloeus minutus (French: mouette pygmée) – A
- Ross's gull Rhodostethia rosea (French: mouette de Ross) – A
- Black-legged kittiwake Rissa tridactyla (French: mouette tridactyle) – A
- Ivory gull Pagophila eburnea (French: mouette blanche) – A
- Sabine's gull Xema sabini (French: mouette de Sabine) – A
- Slender-billed gull Chroicocephalus genei (French: goéland railleur) – A
- Bonaparte's gull Chroicocephalus philadelphia (French: mouette de Bonaparte) – A
- Black-headed gull Chroicocephalus ridibundus (French: mouette rieuse) – A
- Laughing gull Leucophaeus atricilla (French: mouette atricille) – A
- Franklin's gull Leucophaeus pipixcan (French: mouette de Franklin) – A
- Pallas's gull Ichthyaetus ichthyaetus (French: goéland ichthyaète) – A
- Audouin's gull Ichthyaetus audouinii (French: goéland d'Audouin) – A
- Mediterranean gull Ichthyaetus melanocephalus (French: mouette mélanocéphale) – A
- Common gull Larus canus (French: goéland cendré) – A
- Ring-billed gull Larus delawarensis (French: goéland à bec cerclé) – A
- Caspian gull Larus cachinnans (French: goéland pontique) – A
- Kelp gull Larus dominicanus (French: goéland dominicain) – A
- European herring gull Larus argentatus (French: goéland argenté) – A
- Vega gull Larus vegae (French: goéland de la Véga) – A
- Yellow-legged gull Larus michahellis (French: goéland leucophée) – A
- Great black-backed gull Larus marinus (French: goéland marin) – A
- Glaucous gull Larus hyperboreus (French: goéland bourgmestre) – A
- Lesser black-backed gull Larus fuscus (French: goéland brun) – A
- American herring gull Larus smithsonianus (French: goéland d'Amérique) – A
- Iceland gull Larus glaucoides (French: goéland arctique) – A

== Skuas ==
Order: Charadriiformes Family: Stercorariidae

The family Stercorariidae are medium to large seabirds, typically with greyish to brown plumage, often with white markings on the wings. They nest on the ground in temperate and arctic regions and are mostly long-distance migrants.

- Long-tailed skua Stercorarius longicaudus (French: labbe à longue queue) – A
- Arctic skua Stercorarius parasiticus (French: labbe parasite) – A
- Pomarine skua Stercorarius pomarinus (French: labbe pomarin) – A
- Great skua Stercorarius skua (French: grand labbe) – A
- South polar skua Stercorarius maccormicki (French: labbe de McCormick) – A

== Auks, guillemots, and puffins ==
Order: Charadriiformes Family: Alcidae

Alcidae are a family of seabirds which are superficially similar to penguins with their black and white plumage, their upright posture, and some of their habits, but which are able to fly.

- Atlantic puffin Fratercula arctica (French: macareux moine) – A
- Black guillemot Cepphus grylle (French: guillemot à miroir) – A
- Razorbill Alca torda (French: petit pingouin) – A
- Great auk Pinguinus impennis (French: grand pingouin) – B (extinct)
- Little auk Alle alle (French: mergule nain) – A
- Brünnich's guillemot Uria lomvia (French: guillemot de Brünnich) – A
- Common guillemot Uria aalge (French: guillemot de Troil) – A

== Tropicbirds ==
Order: Phaethontiformes Family: Phaethontidae

The tropicbirds are a small group of tropical seabirds with long central tail streamers. Recent global warming has resulted in these birds being seen at higher latitudes in the last 10–20 years.

- Red-billed tropicbird Phaethon aethereus (French: Phaéton à bec rouge) – A

== Divers or loons ==
Order: Gaviiformes Family: Gaviidae

Divers are a group of aquatic birds found in northern parts of North America and Eurasia. They are around the size of a cormorant, which they somewhat resemble in shape when swimming, but to which they are completely unrelated. In particular, their legs are set very far back which assists swimming underwater but makes walking on land extremely difficult.

- Red-throated diver Gavia stellata (French: plongeon catmarin) – A
- Black-throated diver Gavia arctica (French: plongeon artique) – A
- Great northern diver Gavia immer (French: plongeon imbrin) – A
- White-billed diver Gavia adamsii (French: plongeon à bec blanc) – A

== Southern storm petrels ==
Order: Procellariiformes Family: Oceanitidae

The families Oceanitidae and Hydrobatidae are the storm petrels, small pelagic petrels with a fluttering flight which often follow ships.

- Wilson's storm petrel Oceanites oceanicus (French: océanite de Wilson) – A

== Albatrosses ==
Order: Procellariiformes Family: Diomedeidae

The albatrosses are among the largest of flying birds, and the great albatrosses of the genus Diomedea have the largest wingspans of any extant birds.

- Snowy albatross Diomedea exulans (French: albatros hurleur) – B
- Atlantic yellow-nosed albatross Thalassarche chlororhynchos (French: albatros à nez jaune) – A
- Black-browed albatross Thalassarche melanophris (French: albatros à sourcils noirs) – A

== Northern storm petrels ==
Order: Procellariiformes Family: Hydrobatidae

The northern storm-petrels are relatives of the petrels and are the smallest seabirds. They feed on planktonic crustaceans and small fish picked from the surface, typically while hovering. The flight is fluttering and sometimes bat-like.

- European storm petrel Hydrobates pelagicus (French: océanite tempête) – A
- Swinhoe's storm petrel Hydrobates monorhis (French: océanite de Swinhoe) – A
- Leach's storm petrel Hydrobates leucorheus (French: océanite cul-blanc) – A
- Band-rumped storm petrel Hydrobates castro (French: océanite de Castro) – A

== Shearwaters and petrels ==
Order: Procellariiformes Family: Procellariidae

The procellariids are the main group of medium-sized "true petrels", characterized by united nostrils with medium septum and a long outer functional primary.

- Northern fulmar Fulmarus glacialis (French: fulmar boréal) – A
- Cape petrel Daption capense (French: damier du Cap) – A
- Fea's petrel Pterodroma feae (French: pétrel gongon) – A
- Cory's shearwater Calonectis borealis (French: puffin cendré) – A
- Scopoli's shearwater Calonectis diomedea (French: puffin de Scopoli) – A
- Buller's shearwater Ardenna bulleri (French: puffin de Buller) – A
- Sooty shearwater Ardenna griseus (French: puffin fuligineux) – A
- Short-tailed shearwater Ardenna tenuirostris (French: puffin à bec grêle) – A
- Great shearwater Ardenna gravis (French: puffin majeur) – A
- Manx shearwater Puffinus puffinus (French: puffin des Anglais) – A
- Yelkouan shearwater Puffinus yelkouan (French: puffin yelkouan) – A
- Balearic shearwater Puffinus mauretanicus (French: puffin des Baléares) – A
- Barolo shearwater Puffinus baroli (French: puffin de Macaronésie) – A
- Bulwer's petrel Bulweria bulwerii (French: pétrel de Bulwer) – A

== Storks ==
Order: Ciconiiformes Family: Ciconiidae

Storks are large, long-legged, long-necked wetland birds with long, stout bills. Storks are mute, but bill-clattering is an important mode of communication at the nest. Their nests can be large and may be reused for many years. Many species are migratory.

- Black stork Ciconia nigra (French: cigogne noire) – A
- White stork Ciconia ciconia (French: cigogne blanche) – AC

== Frigatebirds ==
Order: Suliformes Family: Fregatidae

Frigatebirds are large seabirds from the tropics with a very high aspect ratio. These birds do not swim and cannot walk well, and cannot take off from a flat surface.

- Magnificent frigatebird Fregata magnificens (French: frégate superbe) – B

== Boobies and gannets ==
Order: Suliformes Family: Sulidae

The sulids comprise the gannets and boobies. Both groups are medium to large coastal seabirds that plunge-dive for fish.

- Northern gannet Morus bassanus (French: fou de Bassan) – A
- Red-footed booby Sula sula (French: fou à pieds rouges) – A
- Brown booby Sula leucogaster (French: fou brun) – A
- Masked booby Sula dactylatra (French: fou masqué) – A

== Cormorants and shags ==
Order: Suliformes Family: Phalacrocoracidae

Phalacrocoracidae is a family of medium-to-large fish-eating seabirds that includes cormorants and shags. Plumage varies, with the majority having mainly dark plumage.

- Pygmy cormorant Microcarbo pygmeus (French: cormoran pygmée) – A
- Reed cormorant Microcarbo africanus (French: cormoran africain) – A
- Great cormorant Phalacrocorax carbo (French: grand cormoran) – A
- European shag Gulosus aristotelis (French: cormoran huppé) – A
- Double-crested cormorant Nannopterum auritum (French: cormoran à aigrettes) – A

== Ibises and spoonbills ==
Order: Pelecaniformes Family: Threskiornithidae

Threskiornithidae is a family of large terrestrial and wading birds which includes the ibises and spoonbills. They have long, broad wings with 11 primary and about 20 secondary feathers. They are strong fliers and, despite their size and weight, very capable soarers.

- African sacred ibis Threskiornis aethiopicus (French: ibis sacré) – C
- Northern bald ibis Geronticus eremita (French: ibis chauve) – C
- Glossy ibis Plegadis falcinellus (French: ibis falcinelle) – A
- Eurasian spoonbill Platalea leucorodia (French: spatule blanche) – A
- African spoonbill Platalea alba (French: spatule d'Afrique) – A

== Herons, egrets, and bitterns ==
Order: Pelecaniformes Family: Ardeidae

The family Ardeidae contains bitterns, herons, and egrets. Herons and egrets are medium to large wading birds with long necks and legs. Bitterns tend to be shorter necked and more wary. Members of Ardeidae fly with their necks retracted, unlike other long-necked birds such as storks, ibises, and spoonbills.

- Great bittern Botaurus stellaris (French: butor étoilé) – A
- Dwarf bittern Ixobrychus sturmii (French: blongios de Sturm) – A
- Little bittern Ixobrychus minutus (French: blongios nain) – A
- Black-crowned night heron Nycticorax nycticorax (French: bihoreau gris) – A
- Little egret Egretta garzetta (French: aigrette garzette) – A
- Western reef heron Egretta gularis (French: aigrette des récifs) – A
- Striated heron Butorides striata (French: héron strié) – A
- Green heron Butorides virescens (French: héron vert) – A
- Squacco heron Ardeola ralloides (French: crabier chevelu) – A
- Western cattle egret Bubulcus ibis (French: héron garde-boeufs) – A
- Great egret Ardea alba (French: grande aigrette) – A
- Medium egret Ardea intermedia (French: héron intermédiaire) – A
- Grey heron Ardea cinerea (French: héron cendré) – A
- Great blue heron Ardea herodias (French: grand héron) – A
- Purple heron Ardea purpurea (French: héron pourpré) – A
- Black-headed heron Ardea melanocephala (French: héron mélanocéphale) – A

== Pelicans ==
Order: Pelecaniformes Family: Pelecanidae

Pelicans are very large water birds with a distinctive pouch under their beak. They have four webbed toes.

- Great white pelican Pelecanus onocrotalus (French: pélican blanc) – A
- Dalmatian pelican Pelecanus crispus (French: pélican frisé) – A

== Osprey ==
Order: Accipitriformes Family: Pandionidae

The osprey is a medium-large raptor which is a specialist fish-eater.

- Osprey Pandion haliaetus (French: balbuzard pêcheur) – A

== Hawks, eagles, and kites ==
Order: Accipitriformes Family: Accipitridae

Accipitridae is a family of birds of prey which includes hawks, eagles, kites, harriers, and Old World vultures. They have powerful hooked beaks for tearing flesh from their prey, strong legs, powerful talons, and keen eyesight.

- Black-winged kite Elanus caeruleus (French: élanion blanc) – A
- Bearded vulture Gypaetus barbatus (French: gypaète barbu) – AC
- Egyptian vulture Neophron percnopterus (French: percnoptère d'Egypte) – A
- European honey buzzard Pernis apivorus (French: bondrée apivore) – A
- Crested honey buzzard Pernis ptilorhynchus (French: bondrée orientale) – A
- Rüppell's vulture Gyps rueppelli (French: vautour de Rüppell) – A
- Griffon vulture Gyps fulvus (French: vautour fauve) – AC
- Eurasian black vulture Aegypius monachus (French: vautour moine) – AC
- Lappet-faced vulture Torgos tracheliotos (French: vautour oricou) – B
- Short-toed snake eagle Circaetus gallicus (French: circaète Jean-le-Blanc) – A
- Lesser spotted eagle Clanga pomarina (French: aigle pomarin) – A
- Greater spotted eagle Clanga clanga (French: aigle criard) – A
- Booted eagle Aquila pennatus (French: aigle botté) – A
- Steppe eagle Aquila nipalensis (French: aigle des steppes) – A
- Spanish imperial eagle Aquila adalberti (French: aigle ibérique) – A
- Eastern imperial eagle Aquila heliaca (French: aigle impérial) – A
- Golden eagle Aquila chrysaetos (French: aigle royal) – A
- Bonelli's eagle Aquila fasciata (French: aigle de Bonelli) – A
- Eurasian sparrowhawk Accipiter nisus (French: épervier d'Europe) – A
- Eurasian goshawk Accipiter gentilis (French: autour des palombes) – A
- Western marsh harrier Circus aeruginosus (French: busard des roseaux) – A
- Hen harrier Circus cyaneus (French: busard Saint-Martin) – A
- Northern harrier Circus hudsonius (French: busard des marais) – A
- Pallid harrier Circus macrourus (French: busard pâle) – A
- Montagu's harrier Circus pygargus (French: busard cendré) – A
- Red kite Milvus milvus (French: milan royal) – A
- Black kite Milvus migrans (French: milan noir) – A
- White-tailed eagle Haliaeetus albicilla (French: pygargue à queue blanche) – A
- Rough-legged buzzard Buteo lagopus (French: buse pattue) – A
- Long-legged buzzard Buteo rufinus (French: buse féroce) – A
- Common buzzard Buteo buteo (French: buse variable) – A

== Barn owls ==
Order: Strigiformes Family: Tytonidae

Barn owls are medium to large owls with large heads and characteristic heart-shaped faces. They have long strong legs with powerful talons.

- Western barn owl Tyto alba (French: effraie des clochers) – A

== Owls ==
Order: Strigiformes Family: Strigidae

Typical owls are small to large solitary nocturnal birds of prey. They have large forward-facing eyes and ears, a hawk-like beak, and a conspicuous circle of feathers around each eye called a facial disc.

- Tengmalm's owl Aegolius funereus (French: nyctale de Tengmalm) – A
- Little owl Athene noctua (French: chevêche d'Athéna) – A
- Northern hawk-owl Surnia ulula (French: chouette épervière) – B
- Eurasian pygmy owl Glaucidium passerinum (French: chevêchette d'Europe) – A
- Eurasian scops owl Otus scops (French: petit-duc scops) – A
- Long-eared owl Asio otus (French: hibou moyen-duc) – A
- Short-eared owl Asio flammeus (French: hibou des marais) – A
- Snowy owl Bubo scandiacus (French: harfang des neiges) – A
- Eurasian eagle-owl Bubo bubo (French: grand-duc d'Europe) – A
- Tawny owl Strix aluco (French: chouette hulotte) – A

== Hoopoes ==
Order: Bucerotiformes Family: Upupidae

Hoopoes have black and white wings and orangey-pink body plumage, with a large erectile crest on their head.

- Eurasian hoopoe Upupa epops (French: huppe fasciée) – A

== Rollers ==
Order: Coraciiformes Family: Coraciidae

Rollers resemble crows in size and build, but are more closely related to the kingfishers and bee-eaters. They share the colourful appearance of those groups with blues and browns predominating. The two inner front toes are connected, but the outer toe is not.

- European roller Coracias garrulus (French: rollier d'Europe) – A

== Kingfishers ==
Order: Coraciiformes Family: Alcedinidae

Kingfishers are medium-sized birds with large heads, long pointed bills, short legs, and stubby tails.

- Common kingfisher Alcedo atthis (French: martin-pêcheur d'Europe) – A
- Belted kingfisher Megaceryle alcyon (French: martin-pêcheur d'Amérique) – A
- Pied Kingfisher Ceryle rudis (French: martin-pêcheur pie) –

== Bee-eaters ==
Order: Coraciiformes Family: Meropidae

The bee-eaters are a group of near-passerine birds. Most species are found in Africa but others occur in southern Europe, Madagascar, Australia, and New Guinea. They have richly coloured plumage, slender bodies, and usually elongated central tail feathers. All have long downturned bills and pointed wings, which give them a swallow-like appearance when seen from afar.

- Blue-cheeked bee-eater Merops persicus (French: guêpier de Perse) – A
- European bee-eater Merops apiaster (French: guêpier d'Europe) – A

== Woodpeckers ==
Order: Piciformes Family: Picidae

Woodpeckers are small to medium-sized birds with chisel-like beaks, short legs, stiff tails, and long tongues used for capturing insects. Some species have feet with two toes pointing forward and two backward, while several species have only three toes. Many woodpeckers have the habit of tapping noisily on tree trunks with their beaks.

- Eurasian wryneck Jynx torquilla (French: torcol fourmilier) – A
- Eurasian three-toed woodpecker Picoides tridactylus (French: pic tridactyle) – A
- Middle spotted woodpecker Dendrocoptes medius (French: pic mar) – A
- Lesser spotted woodpecker Dryobates minor (French: pic épeichette) – A
- Great spotted woodpecker Dendrocopos major (French: pic épeiche) – A
- White-backed woodpecker Dendrocopos leucotos (French: pic à dos blanc) – A
- Black woodpecker Dryocopus martius (French: pic noir) – A
- European green woodpecker Picus viridis (French: pic vert) – A
- Iberian green woodpecker Picus sharpei (French: pic de Sharpe) – A
- Grey-headed woodpecker Picus canus (French: pic cendré) – A

== Falcons and caracaras ==
Order: Falconiformes Family: Falconidae

Falconidae is a family of diurnal birds of prey. They differ from hawks, eagles, and kites in that they kill with their beaks instead of their talons.

- Lesser kestrel Falco naumanni (French: faucon crécerellette) – A
- Common kestrel Falco tinnunculus (French: faucon crécerelle) – A
- American kestrel Falco sparverius (French: crécerelle d'Amérique) –
- Red-footed falcon Falco vespertinus (French: faucon kobez) – A
- Amur falcon Falco amurensis (French: faucon de l'Amour) – A
- Eleonora's falcon Falco eleonorae (French: faucon d'Eléonore) – A
- Sooty falcon Falco concolor (French: faucon concolore) – A
- Merlin Falco columbarius (French: faucon émerillon) – A
- Eurasian hobby Falco subbuteo (French: faucon hobereau) – A
- Lanner falcon Falco biarmicus (French: faucon lanier) – A
- Saker falcon Falco cherrug (French: faucon sacre) – A
- Gyrfalcon Falco rusticolus (French: faucon gerfaut) – A
- Peregrine falcon Falco peregrinus (French: faucon pèlerin) – A

== New World parrots ==
Order: Psittaciformes Family: Psittacidae

A family of parrots mainly in the New World but also a few species in Africa. None are native in France, but one species has a feral population derived from escaped pets.

- Monk parakeet Myiopsitta monachus (French: perriche veuve) – C

== Old World parrots ==
Order: Psittaciformes Family: Psittaculidae

Old World parrots are found from Africa across southern Asia and Oceania to Australia and New Zealand. None are native in France, but one species has a feral population derived from escaped pets.

- Rose-ringed parakeet Psittacula krameri (French: perruche à collier) – C

== Vireos, shrike-babblers, and erpornis ==
Order: Passeriformes Family: Vireonidae

The vireos are a group of small- to medium-sized passerine birds restricted to the New World.

- Red-eyed vireo Vireo olivaceus (French: viréo aux yeux rouges) – A

== Old World orioles ==
Order: Passeriformes Family: Oriolidae

The Old World orioles are colourful passerine birds that are not related to the New World orioles.

- Eurasian golden oriole Oriolus oriolus (French: loriot d'Europe) – A

== Shrikes ==
Order: Passeriformes Family: Laniidae

Shrikes are passerine birds known for their habit of catching other birds and small animals and impaling the uneaten portions of their bodies on thorns. A shrike's beak is hooked, like that of a typical bird of prey.

- Great grey shrike Lanius excubitor (French: pie-grièche grise) – A
- Iberian grey shrike Lanius meridionalis (French: pie-grièche méridionale) – A
- Masked shrike Lanius nubicus (French: pie-grièche masquée) – A
- Lesser grey shrike Lanius minor (French: pie-grièche à poitrine rose) – A
- Woodchat shrike Lanius senator (French: pie-grièche à tête rousse) – A
- Isabelline shrike Lanius isabellinus (French: pie-grièche isabelle) – A
- Red-backed shrike Lanius collurio (French: pie-grièche écorcheur) – A
- Red-tailed shrike Lanius phoenicuroides (French: pie-grièche du Turkestan) – A
- Brown shrike Lanius cristatus (French: pie-grièche brune) – A

== Crows, jays, and magpies ==
Order: Passeriformes Family: Corvidae

The family Corvidae includes crows, ravens, jays, choughs, magpies, and nutcrackers. Corvids are larger than the average size for species in the order Passeriformes and some show high levels of intelligence and exceptional spatial memory.

- Eurasian jay Garrulus glandarius (French: geai des chênes) – A
- Eurasian magpie Pica pica (French: pie bavarde) – A
- Northern nutcracker Nucifraga caryocatactes (French: cassenoix moucheté) – A
- Red-billed chough Pyrrhocorax pyrrhocorax (French: crave à bec rouge) – A
- Alpine chough Pyrrhocorax graculus (French: chocard à bec jaune) – A
- Western jackdaw Corvus monedula (French: choucas des tours) – A
- Daurian jackdaw Coloeus dauuricus (French: choucas de Daourie) – A
- House crow Corvus splendens (French: corbeau familier) – A
- Rook Corvus frugilegus (French: corbeau freux) – A
- Carrion crow Corvus corone (French: corneille noire) – A
- Hooded crow Corvus cornix (French: corneille mantelée) – A
- Pied crow Corvus albus (French: corbeau pie) – A
- Common raven Corvus corax (French: grand corbeau) – A
- Fan-tailed raven Corvus rhipidurus (French: corbeau à queue courte) – A

== Waxwings ==
Order: Passeriformes Family: Bombycillidae

The waxwings are a group of birds with soft silky plumage and unique red tips to some of the wing feathers. These tips look like sealing wax and give the group its name. These are arboreal birds of northern forests. They live on insects in summer and berries in winter.

- Bohemian waxwing Bombycilla garrulus (French: jaseur boréal) – A

== Tits ==
Order: Passeriformes Family: Paridae

The tits are mainly small stocky woodland species with short but strong bills. Some have crests. They are adaptable birds, with a mixed diet including seeds and insects.

- Coal tit Periparus ater (French: mésange noire) – A
- Crested tit Lophophanes cristatus (French: mésange huppée) – A
- Marsh tit Poecile palustris (French: mésange nonnette) – A
- Willow tit Poecile montanus (French: mésange boréale) – A
- Eurasian blue tit Cyanistes caeruleus (French: mésange bleue) – A
- Azure tit Cyanistes cyanus (French: mésange azurée) – A
- Great tit Parus major (French: mésange charbonnière) – A

== Penduline tits ==
Order: Passeriformes Family: Remizidae

The penduline tits are a group of small insectivorous birds related to the true tits, but with complex pendulous nests.

- Eurasian penduline tit Remiz pendulinus (French: rémiz penduline) – A

== Bearded reedling ==
Order: Passeriformes Family: Panuridae

This species, the only one in its family, is found in reed beds throughout temperate Europe and Asia.

- Bearded reedling Panurus biarmicus (French: panure à moustaches) – A

== Larks ==
Order: Passeriformes Family: Alaudidae

Larks are small terrestrial birds with often extravagant songs and display flights. Most larks are dull in appearance. Their food is insects and seeds.

- Bar-tailed lark Ammomanes cinctura (French: ammomane élégante) – A
- Wood lark Lullula arborea (French: alouette lulu) – A
- Eurasian skylark Alauda arvensis (French: alouette des champs) – A
- Thekla's lark Galerida theklae (French: cochevis de Thékla) – A
- Crested lark Galerida cristata (French: cochevis huppé) – A
- Shore lark Eremophila alpestris (French: alouette haussecol) – A
- Greater short-toed lark Calandrella brachydactyla (French: alouette calandrelle) – A
- Bimaculated lark Melanocorypha bimaculata (French: alouette monticole) – A
- Calandra lark Melanocorypha calandra (French: alouette calandre) – A
- Dupont's lark Chersophilus duponti (French: sirli de Dupont) – B
- Mediterranean short-toed lark Alaudala rufescens (French: alouette pispolette) – A

== Swallows ==
Order: Passeriformes Family: Hirundinidae

The family Hirundinidae is adapted to aerial feeding on flying insects. They have a slender streamlined body, long pointed wings, and a short bill with a wide gape. The feet are adapted to perching rather than walking, and the front toes are partially joined at the base.

- Brown-throated martin Riparia paludicola (French: hirondelle paludicole) – A
- Sand martin Riparia riparia (French: hirondelle de rivage) – A
- Tree swallow Tachycineta bicolor (French: hirondelle bicolore) – A
- Eurasian crag martin Ptyonoprogne rupestris (French: hirondelle de rochers) – A
- Barn swallow Hirundo rustica (French: hirondelle rustique) – A
- Western house martin Delichon urbicum (French: hirondelle de fenêtre) – A
- European red-rumped swallow Hirundo rufigula (French: hirondelle rousseline) – A
- American cliff swallow Petrochelidon pyrrhonota (French: hirondelle à front blanc) – A

== Bush warblers and allies ==
Order: Passeriformes Family: Cettiidae

The members of this family are found across warmer areas of Europe, Africa, Asia, and Polynesia. They are insectivores.

- Cetti's warbler Cettia cetti (French: bouscarle de Cetti) – A

== Long-tailed tits ==
Order: Passeriformes Family: Aegithalidae

Long-tailed tits are a group of small passerine birds with medium to long tails. They make woven bag nests in trees. Most eat a mixed diet which includes insects, spiders and small seeds.

- Long-tailed tit Aegithalos caudatus (French: orite à longue queue) – A

== Leaf warblers ==
Order: Passeriformes Family: Phylloscopidae

Leaf warblers are a family of small insectivorous birds found mostly in Eurasia and ranging into Wallacea and Africa. The species are of various sizes, often green-plumaged above and yellow or white below, or more subdued with greyish-green to greyish-brown colours. The highest diversity is in eastern Asia, but many are long-distance migrants, also prone to vagrancy, and several east Asian species regularly occur in western Europe including France in the late autumn.

- Wood warbler Phylloscopus sibilatrix (French: pouillot siffleur) – A
- Western Bonelli's warbler Phylloscopus bonelli (French: pouillot de Bonelli) – A
- Eastern Bonelli's warbler Phylloscopus orientalis (French: pouillot oriental) – A
- Hume's leaf warbler Phylloscopus humei (French: pouillot de Hume) – A
- Yellow-browed warbler Phylloscopus inornatus (French: pouillot à grands sourcils) – A
- Pallas's leaf warbler Phylloscopus proregulus (French: pouillot de Pallas) – A
- Radde's warbler Phylloscopus schwarzi (French: pouillot de Schwarz) – A
- Dusky warbler Phylloscopus fuscatus (French: pouillot brun) – A
- Willow warbler Phylloscopus trochilus (French: pouillot fitis) – A
- Common chiffchaff Phylloscopus collybita (French: pouillot véloce) – A
- Iberian chiffchaff Phylloscopus ibericus (French: pouillot ibérique) – A
- Eastern crowned warbler Phylloscopus coronatus (French: pouillot de Temminck) – A
- Two-barred warbler Phylloscopus plumbeitarsus (French: pouillot à pattes sombres) – A
- Greenish warbler Phylloscopus trochiloides (French: pouillot verdâtre) – A
- Arctic warbler Phylloscopus borealis (French: pouillot boréal) – A

== Reed warblers and allies ==
Order: Passeriformes Family: Acrocephalidae

The members of this family are medium size to large warblers. Most are rather plain olivaceous brown above and yellow to pale buff below. They are usually found in open woodland, reedbeds, or tall grass. The family occurs mostly in southern to western Eurasia and surroundings, but it also ranges far into the Pacific, and several species in Africa.

- Great reed warbler Acrocephalus arundinaceus (French: rousserolle turdoïde) – A
- Moustached warbler Acrocephalus melanopogon (French: lusciniole à moustaches) – A
- Aquatic warbler Acrocephalus paludicola (French: phragmite aquatique) – A
- Sedge warbler Acrocephalus schoenobaenus (French: phragmite des joncs) – A
- Paddyfield warbler Acrocephalus agricola (French: rousserolle isabelle) – A
- Blyth's reed warbler Acrocephalus dumetorum (French: rousserolle des buissons) – A
- Common reed warbler Acrocephalus scirpaceus (French: rousserolle effarvatte) – A
- Marsh warbler Acrocephalus palustris (French: rousserolle verderolle) – A
- Thick-billed warbler Arundinax aedon (French: rousserolle à gros bec) – A
- Booted warbler Iduna caligata (French: hypolaïs bottée) – A
- Sykes's warbler Iduna rama (French: hypolaïs rama) – A
- Eastern olivaceous warbler Iduna pallida (French: hypolaïs pâle) – A
- Western olivaceous warbler Iduna opaca (French: hypolaïs obscure) – A
- Melodious warbler Hippolais polyglotta (French: hypolaïs polyglotte) – A
- Icterine warbler Hippolais icterina (French: hypolaïs ictérine) – A

== Grassbirds and allies ==
Order: Passeriformes Family: Locustellidae

Locustellidae are a family of small insectivorous songbirds found mainly in Eurasia, Africa, and the Australian region. They are smallish birds with tails that are usually long and pointed, and tend to be drab brownish or buffy all over.

- Gray's grasshopper warbler Helopsaltes fasciolatus (French: locustelle fasciée) – A
- Pallas's grasshopper warbler Helopsaltes certhiola (French: locustelle de Pallas) – A
- Lanceolated warbler Locustella lanceolata (French: locustelle lancéolée) – A
- River warbler Locustella fluviatilis (French: locustelle fluviatile) – A
- Savi's warbler Locustella luscinioides (French: locustelle luscinioide) – A
- Common grasshopper warbler Locustella naevia (French: locustelle tachetée) – A

== Cisticolas and allies ==
Order: Passeriformes Family: Cisticolidae

The Cisticolidae are a family of warblers found in warmer southern regions of the Old World. They are generally very small birds of drab brown or grey appearance, found in open country such as grassland or scrub.

- Zitting cisticola Cisticola juncidis (French: cisticole des joncs) – A

== Sylviid warblers, parrotbills, and allies ==
Order: Passeriformes Family: Sylviidae

The family Sylviidae is a group of small insectivorous birds. They mainly occur in Europe, Asia and, to a lesser extent, Africa; the highest diversity is in the Mediterranean region. Most are generally grey-brown, but often with black or grey head patterns, and a white throat; some have a reddish breast and/or rufous wings. Many have distinctive songs.

- Eurasian blackcap Sylvia atricapilla (French: fauvette à tête noire) – A
- Garden warbler Sylvia borin (French: fauvette des jardins) – A
- Barred warbler Curruca nisoria (French: fauvette épervière) – A
- Lesser whitethroat Curruca curruca (French: fauvette babillarde) – A
- Western Orphean warbler Curruca hortensis (French: fauvette orphée) – A
- Eastern Orphean warbler Curruca crassirostris (French: fauvette orphéane) – A
- Asian desert warbler Curruca nana (French: fauvette naine) – A
- Tristram's warbler Curruca deserticola (French: fauvette de l'Atlas) – A
- Rüppell's warbler Curruca ruppeli (French: fauvette de Rüppell) – A
- Sardinian warbler Curruca melanocephala (French: fauvette mélanocéphale) – A
- Western subalpine warbler Curruca iberiae (French: fauvette passerinette) – A
- Moltoni's warbler Curruca subalpina (French: fauvette de Moltoni) – A
- Eastern subalpine warbler Curruca cantillans (French: fauvette des Balkans) – A
- Common whitethroat Curruca communis (French: fauvette grisette) – A
- Spectacled warbler Curruca conspicillata (French: fauvette à lunettes) – A
- Marmora's warbler Curruca sarda (French: fauvette sarde) – A
- Dartford warbler Curruca undata (French: fauvette pitchou) – A

== Laughingthrushes and allies ==
Order: Passeriformes Family: Leiothrichidae

The laughingthrushes are a family of mainly Asian passerine birds, diverse in size and colour. One species has become established in France from escaped cagebirds.

- Red-billed leiothrix Leiothrix lutea (French: léiothrix jaune) – C

== Crests ==
Order: Passeriformes Family: Regulidae

The crests and kinglets are a small family of birds which resemble some warblers. They are very small insectivorous birds in the single genus Regulus. The adults have coloured crowns, giving rise to their name.

- Common firecrest Regulus ignicapillus (French: roitelet à triple bandeau) – A
- Goldcrest Regulus regulus (French: roitelet huppé) – A

== Wrens ==
Order: Passeriformes Family: Troglodytidae

The wrens are mainly small and inconspicuous except for their loud songs. They have short wings and thin down-turned bills, and often hold their tails upright. All are insectivorous. The family is almost entirely found in the New World, with just one species widespread in the Old World, including France. A second species is cited on the current French list, but without details.

- Eurasian wren Troglodytes troglodytes (French: troglodyte mignon) – A
- Marsh wren Cistothorus palustris (French: troglodyte des marais) – ?

== Nuthatches ==
Order: Passeriformes Family: Sittidae

Nuthatches are small woodland birds. They have the unusual ability to climb down trees head first, unlike other birds which can only go upwards. Nuthatches have big heads, short tails, and powerful bills and feet. The Corsican nuthatch is the sole endemic species in France.

- Eurasian nuthatch Sitta europaea (French: sittelle torchepot) – A
- Corsican nuthatch Sitta whiteheadi (French: sittelle corse) (endemic) – A

== Wallcreeper ==
Order: Passeriformes Family: Tichodromidae

The wallcreeper is a small bird of mountain crags related to the nuthatch family, which has stunning crimson, grey, and black plumage. It is the only species in its family.

- Wallcreeper Tichodroma muraria (French: tichodrome échelette) – A

== Treecreepers ==
Order: Passeriformes Family: Certhiidae

Treecreepers are small woodland birds, brown above and white below. They have thin pointed down-curved bills, which they use to extricate insects from bark. They have stiff tail feathers, like woodpeckers, which they use to support themselves on vertical trees.

- Eurasian treecreeper Certhia familiaris (French: grimpereau des bois) – A
- Short-toed treecreeper Certhia brachydactyla (French: grimpereau des jardins) – A

== Starlings ==
Order: Passeriformes Family: Sturnidae

Starlings are small to medium-sized passerine birds. Their flight is strong and direct and they are very gregarious. Their preferred habitat is fairly open country. They eat insects and fruit. Their plumage is variable; many are dark with a strong to very strong metallic sheen, others are brightly patterned in pink, yellow, or other colours.

- Rosy starling Pastor roseus (French: étourneau roselin) – A
- Common starling Sturnus vulgaris (French: étourneau sansonnet) – A
- Spotless starling Sturnus unicolor (French: étourneau unicolore) – A

== Thrushes and allies ==
Order: Passeriformes Family: Turdidae

The thrushes are a family of birds that occur mainly in the Old World. They are plump, soft-plumaged, small-to-medium-sized insectivores or sometimes omnivores, often feeding on the ground. Many have attractive songs.

- Wood thrush Hylocichla mustelina (French: grive des bois) – ?
- Swainson's thrush Catharus ustulatus (French: grive à dos olive) – A
- Hermit thrush Catharus guttatus (French: grive solitaire) – A
- Grey-cheeked thrush Catharus minimus (French: grive à joues grises) – A
- Veery Catharus fuscescens (French: grive fauve) – A
- White's thrush Zoothera aurea (French: grive dorée) – A
- Siberian thrush Geokichla sibirica (French: grive de Sibérie) – A
- Song thrush Turdus philomelos (French: grive musicienne) – A
- Mistle thrush Turdus viscivorus (French: grive draine) – A
- Redwing Turdus iliacus (French: grive mauvis) – A
- Common blackbird Turdus merula (French: merle noir) – A
- Eyebrowed thrush Turdus obscurus (French: merle obscure) – A
- Fieldfare Turdus pilaris (French: grive litorne) – A
- Ring ouzel Turdus torquatus (French: merle à plastron) – A
- Black-throated thrush Turdus atrogularis (French: grive à gorge noire) – A
- Red-throated thrush Turdus ruficollis (French: grive à gorge rousse) – A
- Dusky thrush Turdus eunomus (French: grive à ailes rousses) – A
- Naumann's thrush Turdus naumanni (French: grive de Naumann) – A

== Old World flycatchers ==
Order: Passeriformes Family: Muscicapidae

Old World flycatchers are a large group of birds which are mainly small arboreal insectivores. The appearance of these birds is highly varied, but they mostly have weak songs and harsh calls.

- Rufous-tailed scrub robin Cercotrichas galactotes (French: agrobate roux) – A
- Asian brown flycatcher Muscicapa dauurica (French: gobemouche brun) – A
- Spotted flycatcher Muscicapa striata (French: gobemouche gris) – A
- Mediterranean flycatcher Muscicapa tyrrhenica (French: gobemouche tyrrhénien) – A
- European robin Erithacus rubecula (French: rougegorge familier) – A
- White-throated robin Irania gutturalis (French: iranie à gorge blanche) – A
- Thrush nightingale Luscinia luscinia (French: rossignol progné) – A
- Common nightingale Luscinia megarhynchos (French: rossignol philomèle) – A
- Bluethroat Luscinia svecica (French: gorgebleue à miroir) – A
- Red-breasted flycatcher Ficedula parva (French: gobemouche nain) – A
- Taiga flycatcher Ficedula albicilla (French: gobemouche de la taïga) – A
- Semicollared flycatcher Ficedula semitorquata (French: gobemouche à demi-collier) – A
- European pied flycatcher Ficedula hypoleuca (French: gobemouche noir) – A
- Collared flycatcher Ficedula albicollis (French: gobemouche à collier) – A
- Red-flanked bluetail Tarsiger cyanurus (French: rossignol à flancs roux) – A
- Black redstart Phoenicurus ochruros (French: rougequeue noir) – A
- Common redstart Phoenicurus phoenicurus (French: rougequeue à front blanc) – A
- Moussier's redstart Phoenicurus moussieri (French: rougequeue de Moussier) – A
- Common rock thrush Monticola saxatilis (French: monticole merle-de-roche) – A
- Blue rock thrush Monticola solitarius (French: monticole merle-bleu) – A
- Whinchat Saxicola rubetra (French: tarier des prés) – A
- Siberian stonechat Saxicola maurus (French: tarier de Sibérie) – A
- European stonechat Saxicola rubicola (French: tarier pâtre) – A
- Northern wheatear Oenanthe oenanthe (French: traquet motteux) – A
- Atlas wheatear Oenanthe seebohmi (French: traquet de Seebohm) – A
- Isabelline wheatear Oenanthe isabellina (French: traquet isabelle) – A
- Desert wheatear Oenanthe deserti (French: traquet du désert) – A
- Western black-eared wheatear Oenanthe hispanica (French: traquet oreillard) – A
- Pied wheatear Oenanthe pleschanka (French: traquet pie) – A
- Eastern black-eared wheatear Oenanthe melanoleuca (French: traquet noir et blanc) – A
- Kurdish wheatear Oenanthe xanthoprymna (French: traquet kurde) – A
- White-crowned wheatear Oenanthe leucopyga (French: traquet à tête blanche) – A
- Black wheatear Oenanthe leucura (French: traquet rieur) – A

== Dippers ==
Order: Passeriformes Family: Cinclidae

Dippers are a group of perching birds whose habitat includes aquatic environments in the Americas, Europe, and Asia. They are named for their bobbing or dipping movements.

- White-throated dipper Cinclus cinclus (French: cincle plongeur) – A

== Old World sparrows ==
Order: Passeriformes Family: Passeridae

In general, Old World sparrows tend to be small, plump, brown or grey birds with short tails and short powerful beaks. Sparrows are seed eaters, but they also consume small insects.

- Rock sparrow Petronia petronia (French: moineau soulcie) – A
- White-winged snowfinch Montifringilla nivalis (French: niverolle alpine) – A
- Eurasian tree sparrow Passer montanus (French: moineau friquet) – A
- Spanish sparrow Passer hispaniolensis (French: moineau espagnol) – A
- Italian sparrow Passer italiae (French: moineau cisalpin) – A
- House sparrow Passer domesticus (French: moineau domestique) – A

== Waxbills and allies ==
Order: Passeriformes Family: Estrildidae

The estrildid finches are small passerine birds of the Old World tropics and Australasia. They are gregarious and often colonial seed eaters with short thick but pointed bills. They are all similar in structure and habits, but have a wide variation in plumage colour and patterns. Many are popular cagebirds, and one species has become established in France from escapes.

- Indian silverbill Euodice malabarica (French: capucin bec-de-plomb) – C

== Accentors and dunnocks ==
Order: Passeriformes Family: Prunellidae

The accentors and dunnocks are the only bird family which is endemic to the Palearctic. They are small, fairly drab species superficially similar to sparrows, but with a slender bill.

- Alpine accentor Prunella collaris (French: accenteur alpin) – A
- Black-throated accentor Prunella atrogularis (French: accenteur à gorge noire) – A
- Dunnock Prunella modularis (French: accenteur mouchet) – A

== Wagtails and pipits ==
Order: Passeriformes Family: Motacillidae

Motacillidae is a family of small birds with medium to long tails which includes the wagtails, longclaws, and pipits. They are slender ground-feeding insectivores of open country.

- Western yellow wagtail Motacilla flava (French: bergeronnette printanière) – A
- Eastern yellow wagtail Motacilla tschutschensis (French: bergeronnette de Béringie) – A
- Citrine wagtail Motacilla citreola (French: bergeronnette citrine) – A
- Grey wagtail Motacilla cinerea (French: bergeronnette des ruisseaux) – A
- White wagtail Motacilla alba (French: bergeronnette grise) – A
- Richard's pipit Anthus richardi (French: pipit de Richard) – A
- Blyth's pipit Anthus godlewskii (French: pipit de Godlewski) – A
- Tawny pipit Anthus campestris (French: pipit rousseline) – A
- Meadow pipit Anthus pratensis (French: pipit farlouse) – A
- Tree pipit Anthus trivialis (French: pipit des arbres) – A
- Olive-backed pipit Anthus hodgsoni (French: pipit à dos olive) – A
- Pechora pipit Anthus gustavi (French: pipit de la Petchora) – A
- Red-throated pipit Anthus cervinus (French: pipit à gorge rousse) – A
- Buff-bellied pipit Anthus rubescens (French: pipit farlousane) – A
- Water pipit Anthus spinoletta (French: pipit spioncelle) – A
- European rock pipit Anthus petrosus (French: pipit maritime) – A

== Finches, euphonias, and allies ==
Order: Passeriformes Family: Fringillidae

Finches are seed-eating birds that are small to moderately large and have a strong beak, usually conical and in some species very large. All have twelve tail feathers and nine primaries. These birds have a bouncing flight with alternating bouts of flapping and gliding on closed wings, and most sing well.

- Common chaffinch Fringilla coelebs (French: pinson des arbres) – A
- African chaffinch Fringilla spodiogenys (French: pinson des arbres africain) – A
- Brambling Fringilla montifringilla (French: pinson du Nord) – A
- Hawfinch Coccothraustes coccothraustes (French: gros-bec casse-noyaux) – A
- Pine grosbeak Pinicola enucleator (French: durbec des sapins) – A
- Eurasian bullfinch Pyrrhula pyrrhula (French: bouvreuil pivoine) – A
- Trumpeter finch Rhodopechys githaginea (French: roselin githagine) – A
- Common rosefinch Carpodacus erythrinus (French: roselin cramoisi) – A
- European greenfinch Chloris chloris (French: verdier d'Europe) – A
- Twite Linaria flavirostris (French: linotte à bec jaune) – A
- Common linnet Linaria cannabina (French: linotte mélodieuse) – A
- Common redpoll Acanthis flammea (French: sizerin flammé) – A
- Lesser redpoll Acanthis cabaret (French: sizerin cabaret) – A
- Arctic redpoll Acanthis hornemanni (French: sizerin blanchâtre) – A
- Parrot crossbill Loxia pytyopsittacus (French: bec-croisé perroquet) – A
- Red crossbill Loxia curvirostra (French: bec-croisé des sapins) – A
- Two-barred crossbill Loxia leucoptera (French: bec-croisé bifascié) – A
- European goldfinch Carduelis carduelis (French: chardonneret élégant) – A
- Citril finch Carduelis citrinella (French: venturon montagnard) – A
- Corsican finch Carduelis corsicana (French: venturon corse) – A
- European serin Serinus serinus (French: serin cini) – A
- Eurasian siskin Spinus spinus (French: tarin des aulnes) – A

== Longspurs and snow buntings ==
Order: Passeriformes Family: Calcariidae

The Calcariidae are a family of birds that had been traditionally grouped with the buntings, but differ in a number of respects and are usually found in open grassy areas.

- Lapland longspur Calcarius lapponicus (French: plectrophane lapon) – A
- Snow bunting Plectrophenax nivalis (French: plectrophane des neiges) – A

== Old World buntings ==
Order: Passeriformes Family: Emberizidae

Emberizidae is a family of Old World passerine birds containing a single genus. Until 2017, the New World sparrows (Passerellidae) were also considered part of this family.

- Corn bunting Emberiza calandra (French: bruant proyer) – A
- Yellowhammer Emberiza citrinella (French: bruant jaune) – A
- Pine bunting Emberiza leucocephalos (French: bruant à calotte blanche) – A
- Rock bunting Emberiza cia (French: bruant fou) – A
- Grey-necked bunting Emberiza buchanani (French: bruant à cou gris) – A
- Ortolan bunting Emberiza hortulana (French: bruant ortolan) – A
- Cretzschmar's bunting Emberiza caesia (French: bruant cendrillard) – B
- Cirl bunting Emberiza cirlus (French: bruant zizi) – A
- House bunting Emberiza sahari (French: bruant du Sahara) – A
- Little bunting Emberiza pusilla (French: bruant nain) – A
- Yellow-browed bunting Emberiza chrysophrys (French: bruant à sourcils jaunes) – B
- Rustic bunting Emberiza rustica (French: bruant rustique) – A
- Yellow-breasted bunting Emberiza aureola (French: bruant auréole) – A
- Chestnut bunting Emberiza rutila (French: bruant roux) – A
- Black-headed bunting Emberiza melanocephala (French: bruant mélanocéphale) – A
- Red-headed bunting Emberiza bruniceps (French: bruant à tête rousse) – A
- Black-faced bunting Emberiza spodocephala (French: bruant masqué) – A
- Pallas's reed bunting Emberiza pallasi (French: bruant de Pallas) – A
- Common reed bunting Emberiza schoeniclus (French: bruant des roseaux) – A

== New World sparrows ==
Order: Passeriformes Family: Passerellidae

Until 2017, these species were considered part of the family Emberizidae. Most of the species are known as sparrows, but these birds are not closely related to the Old World sparrows which are in the family Passeridae. Many of these have distinctive head patterns. Several are transatlantic vagrants; two have reached France.

- White-crowned sparrow Zonotrichia leucophrys (French: bruant à couronne blanche) – A
- White-throated sparrow Zonotrichia albicollis (French: bruant à gorge blanche) – A

== Troupials and allies ==
Order: Passeriformes Family: Icteridae

The icterids are a group of small to medium-sized, often colourful birds restricted to the New World. Most species have black as a predominant plumage colour, often enlivened by yellow, orange, or red. Several are transatlantic vagrants; three have reached France.

- Bobolink Dolichonyx oryzivorus (French: goglu des prés) – A
- Baltimore oriole Icterus galbula (French: oriole de Baltimore) – A
- Brown-headed cowbird Molothrus ater (French: vacher à tête brune) – A

== New World warblers ==
Order: Passeriformes Family: Parulidae

Parulidae are a group of small, often colourful birds restricted to the New World. Most are arboreal and insectivorous. Several are transatlantic vagrants; 11 have reached France.

- Ovenbird Seiurus aurocapilla (French: paruline couronnée) – A
- Louisiana waterthrush Parkesia motacilla (French: paruline hochequeue) – A
- Northern waterthrush Parkesia noveboracensis (French: paruline des ruisseaux) – A
- Black-and-white warbler Mniotilta varia (French: paruline noir et blanc) – A
- American redstart Setophaga ruticilla (French: paruline flamboyante) – A
- Northern parula Setophaga americana (French: paruline à collier) – A
- Blackburnian warbler Setophaga fusca (French: paruline à gorge orangée) – A
- American yellow warbler Setophaga aestiva (French: paruline jaune) – A
- Chestnut-sided warbler Setophaga pensylvanica (French: paruline à flancs marron) – A
- Blackpoll warbler Setophaga striata (French: paruline rayée) – A
- Pine warbler Setophaga pinus (French: paruline des pins) – A

== Cardinals and allies ==
Order: Passeriformes Family: Cardinalidae

The cardinals are a family of robust seed-eating birds with strong bills. They are typically associated with open woodland. The sexes usually have distinct plumages. Several are transatlantic vagrants; three have reached France.

- Scarlet tanager Piranga olivacea (French: tangara écarlate) – A
- Rose-breasted grosbeak Pheucticus ludovicianus (French: cardinal à poitrine rose) – A
- Dickcissel Spiza americana (French: dickcissel d'Amérique) – A

== See also ==
- List of birds
- Lists of birds by region
