= List of birds of Martinique =

This is a list of the bird species recorded in Martinique. Martinique is an overseas department of France located in the Windward Islands, part of the Lesser Antilles in the Caribbean. The avifauna of Martinique included a total of 240 species according to Bird Checklists of the World as of July 2022. Of them, 17 have been introduced by humans and 148 are rare or accidental. Two existing species are endemic, one species has been extirpated, and another is believed to be extinct.

This list is presented in the taxonomic sequence of the Check-list of North and Middle American Birds, 7th edition through the 63rd Supplement, published by the American Ornithological Society (AOS). Common and scientific names are also those of the Check-list, except that the common names of families are from the Clements taxonomy because the AOS list does not include them. French names in parentheses are also from the Check-list.

The following tags have been used to highlight several categories. The tags and notes on population status are also from Bird Checklists of the World.

- (A) Accidental - a species that rarely or accidentally occurs in Martinique
- (I) Introduced - a species introduced directly to Martinique or elsewhere in the New World
- (E) Endemic - a species only found on Martinique
- (Ex) Extirpated - a species no longer found on Martinique
- (Ext) Extinct - a species that is no longer found anywhere in the world

== Ducks, geese, and waterfowl ==
Order: Anseriformes Family: Anatidae

Anatidae includes the ducks and most duck-like waterfowl, such as geese and swans. These birds are adapted to an aquatic existence with webbed feet, flattened bills, and feathers that are excellent at shedding water due to an oily coating.

- Black-bellied whistling-duck (dendrocygne à ventre noir), Dendrocygna autumnalis (A)
- West Indian whistling-duck (dendrocygne des Antilles), Dendrocygna arborea (A) (near-threatened)
- Fulvous whistling-duck (dendrocygne fauve), Dendrocygna bicolor (A)
- Common shelduck (tadorne de Belon), Tadorna tadorna (A)
- Muscovy duck (canard musqué), Cairina moschata (I)
- Garganey (sarcelle d'été), Spatula querquedula (A)
- Blue-winged teal (sarcelle à ailes bleues), Spatula discors (A)
- Cinnamon teal (sarcelle cannelle), Spatula cyanoptera (A)
- Northern shoveler (canard souchet), Spatula clypeata (A)
- Gadwall (canard chipeau), Mareca strepera (A)
- Eurasian wigeon (canard siffleur), Mareca penelope (A)
- American wigeon (canard d'Amérique), Mareca americana (A)
- Mallard (canard colvert), Anas platyrhynchos (A)
- White-cheeked pintail (canard des Bahamas), Anas bahamensis (A)
- Northern pintail (canard pilet), Anas acuta (A)
- Green-winged teal (sarcelle d'hiver), Anas crecca (A)
- Ring-necked duck (fuligule à collier), Aythya collaris (A)
- Lesser scaup (petit Fuligule), Aythya affinis (A)
- Hooded merganser (harle couronné), Lophodytes cucullatus (A)
- Masked duck (érismature routoutou), Nomonyx dominicus
- Ruddy duck (érismature rousse), Oxyura jamaicensis (A)

== Pheasants, grouse, and allies ==
Order: Galliformes Family: Phasianidae

Phasianidae consists of the pheasants and their allies. These are terrestrial species, variable in size but generally plump with broad relatively short wings. Many species are gamebirds or have been domesticated as a food source for humans.

- Red junglefowl (coq bankiva), Gallus gallus (I)

== Flamingos ==
Order: Phoenicopteriformes Family: Phoenicopteridae

Flamingos are gregarious wading birds, usually 3 to 5 feet (0.9 to 1.5 m) tall, found in both the Western and Eastern Hemispheres. Flamingos filter-feed on shellfish and algae. Their oddly shaped beaks are specially adapted to separate mud and silt from the food they consume and, uniquely, are used upside-down.

- American flamingo (flamant des Carabes), Phoenicopterus ruber (A)

== Grebes ==
Order: Podicipediformes Family: Podicipedidae

Grebes are small to medium-large freshwater diving birds. They have lobed toes and are excellent swimmers and divers. However, they have their feet placed far back on the body, making them quite ungainly on land.

- Pied-billed grebe (grèbe à bec bigarré), Podilymbus podiceps (A)

== Pigeons and doves ==
Order: Columbiformes Family: Columbidae

Pigeons and doves are stout-bodied birds with short necks and short slender bills with a fleshy cere.

- Rock pigeon (pigeon biset), Columba livia (I)
- Scaly-naped pigeon (pigeon à cou rouge), Patagioenas squamosa
- White-crowned pigeon (pigeon à couronne blanche), Patagioenas leucocephala (A) (near-threatened)
- Eurasian collared-dove (tourterelle turque), Streptopelia decaocto (I)
- Common ground dove (colombe à queue noire), Columbina passerina
- Ruddy quail-dove (colombe rouviolette), Geotrygon montana (A)
- Bridled quail-dove (colombe à croissants), Geotrygon mystacea (A)
- White-winged dove (Tourterelle à ailes blanches), Zenaida asiatica (A)
- Zenaida dove (tourterelle à queue carrée), Zenaida aurita
- Eared dove (tourterelle oreillarde), Zenaida auriculata (A)

== Cuckoos ==
Order: Cuculiformes Family: Cuculidae

The family Cuculidae includes cuckoos, roadrunners, and anis. These birds are of variable size with slender bodies, long tails, and strong legs. The Old World cuckoos are brood parasites.

- Smooth-billed ani (Ani à bec lisse), Crotophaga ani (A)
- Yellow-billed cuckoo (coulicou à bec jaune), Coccyzus americanus (A)
- Mangrove cuckoo (coulicou manioc), Coccyzus minor

== Nightjars and allies ==
Order: Caprimulgiformes Family: Caprimulgidae

Nightjars are medium-sized nocturnal birds that usually nest on the ground. They have long wings, short legs, and very short bills. Most have small feet, of little use for walking, and long pointed wings. Their soft plumage is camouflaged to resemble bark or leaves.

- Common nighthawk (engoulevent d'Amérique), Chordeiles minor
- Antillean nighthawk (engoulevent piramidig), Chordeiles gundlachii (A)
- White-tailed nightjar (engoulevent coré), Hydropsalis cayennensis (A)

== Swifts ==
Order: Apodiformes Family: Apodidae

Swifts are small birds which spend the majority of their lives flying. These birds have very short legs and never settle voluntarily on the ground, perching instead only on vertical surfaces. Many swifts have long swept-back wings which resemble a crescent or boomerang.

- Black swift (martinet sombre), Cypseloides niger (vulnerable)
- White-collared swift (martinet à collier blanc), Streptoprocne zonaris (A)
- Lesser Antillean swift (martinet chiquesol), Chaetura martinica
- Short-tailed swift (martinet polioure), Chaetura brachyura (A)

== Hummingbirds ==
Order: Apodiformes Family: Trochilidae

Hummingbirds are small birds capable of hovering in mid-air due to the rapid flapping of their wings. They are the only birds that can fly backwards.

- Purple-throated carib (colibri madère), Eulampis jugularis
- Green-throated carib (colibri falle-vert), Eulampis holosericeus
- Blue-headed hummingbird (colibri à tête bleue), Riccordia bicolor
- Antillean crested hummingbird (colibri huppé), Orthorhyncus cristatus

== Rails, gallinules, and coots ==
Order: Gruiformes Family: Rallidae

Rallidae is a large family of small to medium-sized birds which includes the rails, crakes, coots, and gallinules. Typically they inhabit dense vegetation in damp environments near lakes, swamps, or rivers. In general they are shy and secretive birds, making them difficult to observe. Most species have strong legs and long toes which are well adapted to soft uneven surfaces. They tend to have short, rounded wings and to be weak fliers.

- Clapper rail (râle tapageur), Rallus crepitans (A)
- Sora (marouette de Caroline), Porzana carolina (A)
- Common gallinule (gallinule d'Amérique), Gallinula galeata
- American coot (foulque d'Amérique), Fulica americana (A)
- Purple gallinule, Porphyrio martinicus (A)

== Stilts and avocets ==
Order: Charadriiformes Family: Recurvirostridae

Recurvirostridae is a family of large wading birds which includes the avocets and stilts. The avocets have long legs and long up-curved bills. The stilts have extremely long legs and long, thin, straight bills.

- Black-necked stilt (échasse d'Amérique), Himantopus mexicanus

== Oystercatchers ==
Order: Charadriiformes Family: Haematopodidae

The oystercatchers are large and noisy plover-like birds, with strong bills used for smashing or prising open molluscs.

- American oystercatcher (huîtrier d'Amérique), Haematopus palliatus (A)

== Plovers and lapwings ==
Order: Charadriiformes Family: Charadriidae

The family Charadriidae includes the plovers, dotterels, and lapwings. They are small to medium-sized birds with compact bodies, short thick necks, and long, usually pointed, wings. They are found in open country worldwide, mostly in habitats near water.

- Northern lapwing (vanneau huppé), Vanellus vanellus (A) (near-threatened)
- Black-bellied plover (pluvier argenté), Pluvialis squatarola
- American golden-plover (pluvier bronzé), Pluvialis dominica (A)
- Killdeer (pluvier kildir), Charadrius vociferus (A)
- Semipalmated plover (pluvier semipalmé), Charadrius semipalmatus
- Piping plover (pluvier siffleur), Charadrius melodus (A) (near-threatened)
- Little ringed plover (pluvier petit-gravelot), Charadrius dubius (A)
- Wilson's plover (pluvier de Wilson), Charadrius wilsonia (A)
- Collared plover (pluvier de d'Azara), Charadrius collaris (A)
- Snowy plover (pluvier neigeux), Charadrius nivosus (A) (near-threatened)

== Sandpipers and allies ==
Order: Charadriiformes Family: Scolopacidae

Scolopacidae is a large diverse family of small to medium-sized shorebirds including the sandpipers, curlews, godwits, shanks, tattlers, woodcocks, snipes, dowitchers, and phalaropes. The majority of these species eat small invertebrates picked out of the mud or soil. Variation in length of legs and bills enables multiple species to feed in the same habitat, particularly on the coast, without direct competition for food.

- Upland sandpiper (maubèche des champs), Bartramia longicauda
- Whimbrel (courlis corlieu), Numenius phaeopus
- Eskimo curlew (Courlis esquimau), Numenius borealis (A) (believed extinct)
- Long-billed curlew (courlis à long bec), Numenius americanus (A)
- Hudsonian godwit (barge hudsonienne), Limosa haemastica (A)
- Marbled godwit (barge marbrée), Limosa fedoa (A)
- Ruddy turnstone (tournepierre à collier), Arenaria interpres
- Red knot (bécasseau maubèche), Calidris canutus (A) (near-threatened)
- Ruff (combattant varié), Calidris pugnax (A)
- Stilt sandpiper (bécasseau à échasses), Calidris himantopus (A)
- Curlew sandpiper (bécasseau corcorli), Calidris ferruginea (A)
- Sanderling (bécasseau sanderling), Calidris alba (A)
- Dunlin (bécasseau variable), Calidris alpina (A)
- Baird's sandpiper (bécasseau de Baird), Calidris bairdii (A)
- Least sandpiper (bécasseau minuscule), Calidris minutilla
- White-rumped sandpiper (bécasseau à croupion blanc), Calidris fuscicollis (A)
- Buff-breasted sandpiper (bécasseau roussâtre), Calidris subruficollis (near-threatened)
- Pectoral sandpiper (bécasseau à poitrine cendrée), Calidris melanotos (A)
- Semipalmated sandpiper (bécasseau semipalmé), Calidris pusilla (near-threatened)
- Western sandpiper (bécasseau d'Alaska), Calidris mauri (A)
- Short-billed dowitcher (bécassin roux), Limnodromus griseus (A)
- Long-billed dowitcher (bécassin à long bec), Limnodromus scolopaceus (A)
- Wilson's snipe (bécassine de Wilson), Gallinago delicata (A)
- Spotted sandpiper (chevalier grivelé), Actitis macularia
- Solitary sandpiper (chevalier solitaire), Tringa solitaria (A)
- Lesser yellowlegs (petit chevalier), Tringa flavipes
- Willet (chevalier semipalmé), Tringa semipalmata
- Greater yellowlegs (grand chevalier), Tringa melanoleuca
- Wilson's phalarope (phalarope de Wilson), Phalaropus tricolor (A)

== Skuas and jaegers ==
Order: Charadriiformes Family: Stercorariidae

The family Stercorariidae are, in general, medium to large birds, typically with gray or brown plumage, often with white markings on the wings. They nest on the ground in temperate and arctic regions and are long-distance migrants.

- Great skua (grand labbe), Stercorarius skua (A)
- South polar skua (labbe de McCormick), Stercorarius maccormicki (A)
- Pomarine jaeger (labbe pomarin), Stercorarius pomarinus (A)
- Parasitic jaeger (labbe parasite), Stercorarius parasiticus (A)
- Long-tailed jaeger (labbe à longue queue), Stercorarius longicaudus (A)

== Gulls, terns, and skimmers ==
Order: Charadriiformes Family: Laridae

Laridae is a family of medium to large seabirds and includes gulls, kittiwakes, terns and skimmers. They are typically gray or white, often with black markings on the head or wings. They have longish bills and webbed feet. Terns are a group of generally medium to large seabirds typically with gray or white plumage, often with black markings on the head. Most terns hunt fish by diving but some pick insects off the surface of fresh water. Terns are generally long-lived birds, with several species known to live in excess of 30 years. Skimmers are a small family of tropical tern-like birds. They have an elongated lower mandible which they use to feed by flying low over the water surface and skimming the water for small fish.

- Bonaparte's gull (mouette de Bonaparte), Chroicocephalus philadelphia (A)
- Black-headed gull (mouette rieuse), Chroicocephalus ridibundus (A)
- Laughing gull (mouette atricille), Leucophaeus atricilla
- Ring-billed gull (goéland à bec cerclé), Larus delawarensis (A)
- Herring gull (goéland argenté), Larus argentatus (A)
- Lesser black-backed gull (goéland brun), Larus fuscus (A)
- Great black-backed gull (goéland marin), Larus marinus
- Brown noddy (noddi brun), Anous stolidus
- Sooty tern (sterne fuligineuse), Onychoprion fuscatus
- Bridled tern (sterne bridée), Onychoprion anaethetus
- Least tern (petite Sterne), Sternula antillarum (A)
- Gull-billed tern (sterne hansel), Gelochelidon nilotica (A)
- Caspian tern (sterne caspienne), Hydroprogne caspia (A)
- Black tern (guifette noire), Chlidonias niger (A)
- Roseate tern (sterne de Dougall), Sterna dougallii
- Common tern (sterne pierregarin), Sterna hirundo (A)
- Royal tern (sterne royale), Thalasseus maximus
- Sandwich tern (sterne caugek), Thalasseus sandvicensis (A)

== Tropicbirds ==
Order: Phaethontiformes Family: Phaethontidae

Tropicbirds are slender white birds of tropical oceans with exceptionally long central tail feathers. Their heads and long wings have black markings.

- White-tailed tropicbird (phaéton à bec jaune), Phaethon lepturus
- Red-billed tropicbird (phaéton à bec rouge), Phaethon aethereus

== Albatrosses ==
Order: Procellariiformes Family: Diomedeidae

The albatrosses are among the largest of flying birds, and the great albatrosses from the genus Diomedea have the largest wingspans of any extant birds.

- Black-browed albatross (Albatros à sourcils noirs), Thalassarche melanophris (A)

== Southern storm-petrels ==
Order: Procellariiformes Family: Oceanitidae

The southern storm-petrels are relatives of the petrels and are the smallest seabirds. They feed on planktonic crustaceans and small fish picked from the surface, typically while hovering. The flight is fluttering and sometimes bat-like.

- Wilson's storm-petrel (océanite de Wilson), Oceanites oceanicus (A)

== Northern storm-petrels ==
Order: Procellariiformes Family: Hydrobatidae

Though the members of this family are similar in many respects to the southern storm-petrels, including their general appearance and habits, there are enough genetic differences to warrant their placement in a separate family.

- Leach's storm-petrel (océanite cul-blanc), Hydrobates leucorhous (A) (vulnerable)
- Band-rumped storm-petrel (océanite de Castro), Hydrobates castro (A)

== Shearwaters and petrels ==
Order: Procellariiformes Family: Procellariidae

The procellariids are the main group of medium-sized "true petrels", characterised by united nostrils with medium septum and a long outer functional primary.

- Cory's shearwater (puffin cendré), Calonectris diomedea (A)
- Sooty shearwater (puffin fuligineux), Ardenna grisea (A) (near-threatened)
- Great shearwater (puffin majeur), Ardenna gravis (A)
- Manx shearwater (puffin des Anglais), Puffinus puffinus (A)
- Sargasso shearwater (puffin d'Audubon), Puffinus lherminieri
- Black-capped petrel (pétrel de diablotin), Pterodroma hasitata (Note: Black-capped petrel "may have nested on Martinique, although [there is] no strong recent evidence.") (endangered)

== Storks ==
Order: Ciconiiformes Family: Ciconiidae

Storks are large, long-legged, long-necked, wading birds with long, stout bills. Storks are mute, but bill-clattering is an important mode of communication at the nest. Their nests can be large and may be reused for many years. Many species are migratory.

- White stork, Ciconia ciconia (A)

== Frigatebirds ==
Order: Suliformes Family: Fregatidae

Frigatebirds are large seabirds usually found over tropical oceans. They are large, black-and-white, or completely black, with long wings and deeply forked tails. The males have colored inflatable throat pouches. They do not swim or walk and cannot take off from a flat surface. Having the largest wingspan-to-body-weight ratio of any bird, they are essentially aerial, able to stay aloft for more than a week.

- Magnificent frigatebird (frégate superbe), Fregata magnificens

== Boobies and gannets ==
Order: Suliformes Family: Sulidae

The sulids comprise the gannets and boobies. Both groups are medium to large coastal seabirds that plunge-dive for fish.

- Masked booby (fou masqué), Sula dactylatra (A)
- Brown booby (fou brun), Sula leucogaster
- Red-footed booby (fou à pieds rouges), Sula sula (A)
- Northern gannet (fou de Bassan), Morus bassanus (A)

== Pelicans ==
Order: Pelecaniformes Family: Pelecanidae

Pelicans are large water birds with a distinctive pouch under their beak. As with other members of the order Pelecaniformes, they have webbed feet with four toes.

- Brown pelican (pélican brun), Pelecanus occidentalis (A)

== Herons, egrets, and bitterns ==
Order: Pelecaniformes Family: Ardeidae

The family Ardeidae contains the bitterns, herons, and egrets. Herons and egrets are medium to large wading birds with long necks and legs. Bitterns tend to be shorter necked and more wary. Members of Ardeidae fly with their necks retracted, unlike other long-necked birds such as storks, ibises, and spoonbills.

- American bittern (butor d'Amérique), Botaurus lentiginosus (A)
- Least bittern (petit blongios), Ixobrychus exilis (A)
- Great blue heron (grand héron), Ardea herodias (A)
- Gray heron (héron cendré), Ardea cinerea (A)
- Great egret (grande Aigrette), Ardea alba
- Little egret (Aigrette garzette), Egretta garzetta (A)
- Snowy egret (Aigrette neigeuse), Egretta thula
- Little blue heron (Aigrette bleue), Egretta caerulea (A)
- Tricolored heron (Aigrette tricolore), Egretta tricolor (A)
- Cattle egret (héron garde-boeufs), Bubulcus ibis
- Green heron (héron vert), Butorides virescens
- Striated heron (héron strié), Butorides striata (A)
- Black-crowned night-heron (bihoreau gris), Nycticorax nycticorax
- Yellow-crowned night-heron (bihoreau violacé), Nyctanassa violacea

== Ibises and spoonbills ==
Order: Pelecaniformes Family: Threskiornithidae

Threskiornithidae is a family of large terrestrial and wading birds which includes the ibises and spoonbills. They have long, broad wings with 11 primary and about 20 secondary feathers. They are strong fliers and despite their size and weight, very capable soarers.

- Scarlet ibis (ibis rouge), Eudocimus ruber (A)
- Glossy ibis (ibis falcinelle), Plegadis falcinellus (A)
- Eurasian spoonbill, Platalea leucorodia (A)
- Roseate spoonbill (spatule rosée), Platalea ajaja (A)

== Osprey ==
Order: Accipitriformes Family: Pandionidae

The family Pandionidae contains only one species, the osprey. The osprey is a medium-large raptor which is a specialist fish-eater with a worldwide distribution.

- Osprey (balbuzard pêcheur), Pandion haliaetus (A)

== Hawks, eagles, and kites ==
Order: Accipitriformes Family: Accipitridae

Accipitridae is a family of birds of prey which includes hawks, eagles, kites, harriers, and Old World vultures. These birds have powerful hooked beaks for tearing flesh from their prey, strong legs, powerful talons, and keen eyesight.

- Swallow-tailed kite (naucler à queue fourchue), Elanoides forficatus (A)
- Northern harrier (busard des marais), Circus hudonius (A)
- Broad-winged hawk (petite Buse), Buteo platypterus

== Owls ==
Order: Strigiformes Family: Strigidae

Typical or "true" owls are small to large solitary nocturnal birds of prey. They have large forward-facing eyes and ears, a hawk-like beak, and a conspicuous circle of feathers around each eye called a facial disk.

- Burrowing owl (chevêche des terriers), Athene cunicularia (extirpated)

== Kingfishers ==
Order: Coraciiformes Family: Alcedinidae

Water kingfishers are medium-sized birds with large heads, long, pointed bills, short legs, and stubby tails.

- Ringed kingfisher (martin-pêcheur à ventre roux), Megaceryle torquata (A)
- Belted kingfisher (martin-pêcheur d'Amérique), Megaceryle alcyon (A)

== Falcons and caracaras ==
Order: Falconiformes Family: Falconidae

Falconidae is a family of diurnal birds of prey. They differ from hawks, eagles, and kites in that they kill with their beaks instead of their talons.

- Eurasian kestrel (faucon crécerelle), Falco tinnunculus (A)
- American kestrel (crécerelle d'Amérique), Falco sparverius
- Merlin (faucon émerillon), Falco columbarius (A)
- Peregrine falcon (faucon pèlerin), Falco peregrinus

== Old World parrots ==
Order: Psittaciformes Family: Psittaculidae

Parrots are small to large birds with a characteristic curved beak. Their upper mandibles have slight mobility in the joint with the skull and they have a generally erect stance. All parrots are zygodactyl, having the four toes on each foot placed two at the front and two to the back.

- Rose-ringed parakeet (perruche à collier), Eupsittula pertinax (I)

== New World and African parrots ==
Order: Psittaciformes Family: Psittacidae

Parrots are small to large birds with a characteristic curved beak. Their upper mandibles have slight mobility in the joint with the skull and they have a generally erect stance. All parrots are zygodactyl, having the four toes on each foot placed two at the front and two to the back.

- Martinique parrot, Amazona martinicana (extinct)
- Orange-winged parrot, Amazona amazonica (I)

== Tyrant flycatchers ==
Order: Passeriformes Family: Tyrannidae

Tyrant flycatchers are passerine birds which occur throughout North and South America. They superficially resemble the Old World flycatchers, but are more robust and have stronger bills. They do not have the sophisticated vocal capabilities of the songbirds. Most, but not all, have plain coloring. As the name implies, most are insectivorous.

- Caribbean elaenia (élénie siffleuse), Elaenia martinica
- Yellow-bellied elaenia (élénie à ventre jaune), Elaenia flavogaster (A)
- Stolid flycatcher (tyran grosse-tête), Myiarchus stolidus (A)
- Lesser Antillean pewee (moucherolle gobemouche), Contopus latirostris
- Gray kingbird (tyran gris), Tyrannus dominicensis (A)
- Fork-tailed flycatcher (tyran des savanes), Tyrannus savana
- Lesser Antillean flycatcher (tyran janeau), Myiarchus oberi

== Vireos, shrike-babblers, and erpornis ==
Order: Passeriformes Family: Vireonidae

The vireos are a group of small to medium-sized passerine birds. They are typically greenish in color and resemble New World warblers apart from their heavier bills.

- Yellow-throated vireo (viréo à gorge jaune), Vireo flavifrons (A)
- Red-eyed vireo (viréo aux yeux rouges), Vireo olivaceus
- Black-whiskered vireo (viréo à moustaches), Vireo altiloquus

== Swallows ==
Order: Passeriformes Family: Hirundinidae

The family Hirundinidae is adapted to aerial feeding. They have a slender streamlined body, long pointed wings, and a short bill with a wide gape. The feet are adapted to perching rather than walking, and the front toes are partially joined at the base.

- Bank swallow (hirondelle de rivage), Riparia riparia (A)
- Northern rough-winged swallow (hirondelle à ailes hérissées), Stelgidopteryx serripennis (A)
- Caribbean martin (hirondelle à ventre blanc), Progne dominicensis
- White-winged swallow, Tachycineta albiventer (A)
- Barn swallow (hirondelle rustique), Hirundo rustica
- Cliff swallow (hirondelle à front blanc), Petrochelidon pyrrhonota (A)
- Cave swallow (hirondelle à front brun), Petrochelidon fulva (A)

== Wrens ==
Order: Passeriformes Family: Troglodytidae

The wrens are mainly small and inconspicuous except for their loud songs. These birds have short wings and thin down-turned bills. Several species often hold their tails upright. All are insectivorous.

- Kalinago wren (troglodyte familier), Troglodytes martinicensis (Ex)

== Mockingbirds and thrashers ==
Order: Passeriformes Family: Mimidae

The mimids are a family of passerine birds that includes thrashers, mockingbirds, tremblers, and the New World catbirds. These birds are notable for their vocalizations, especially their ability to mimic a wide variety of birds and other sounds heard outdoors. Their coloring tends towards dull-grays and browns.

- Martinique thrasher (moqueur gorge-blanche), Ramphocinclus brachyurus (E) (endangered)
- Scaly-breasted thrasher (moqueur grivotte), Allenia fusca
- Pearly-eyed thrasher (moqueur corossol), Margarops fuscatus
- Brown trembler (trembleur brun), Cinclocerthia ruficauda
- Gray trembler (trembleur gris), Cinclocerthia gutturalis
- Tropical mockingbird (moqueur des savanes), Mimus gilvus

== Thrushes and allies ==
Order: Passeriformes Family: Turdidae

The thrushes are a group of passerine birds that occur mainly in the Old World. They are plump, soft-plumaged, small to medium-sized insectivores or sometimes omnivores, often feeding on the ground. Many have attractive songs.

- Rufous-throated solitaire (solitaire siffleur), Myadestes genibarbis
- Gray-cheeked thrush (grive à joues grises), Catharus minimus (A)
- Spectacled thrush (merle à lunettes), Turdus nudigenis
- Eastern red-legged thrush (merle vantard), Turdus ardosiaceus (A)

== Weavers and allies ==
Order: Passeriformes Family: Ploceidae

The weavers are small passerine birds related to the finches. They are seed-eating birds with rounded conical bills. The males of many species are brightly colored, usually in red or yellow and black, some species show variation in color only in the breeding season.

- Village weaver (tisserin gendarme), Ploceus cucullatus (I)
- Northern red bishop (euplecte franciscain), Euplectes franciscanus (I)

== Waxbills and allies ==
Order: Passeriformes Family: Estrildidae

The estrildid finches are small passerine birds of the Old World tropics and Australasia. They are gregarious and often colonial seed eaters with short thick but pointed bills. They are all similar in structure and habits, but have wide variation in plumage colors and patterns.

- Bronze mannikin (capucin nonnette), Spermestes cucullata (I) (A)
- Scaly-breasted munia (capucin damier), Lonchura punctulata (I) (A)
- Tricolored munia (capucin à dos marron), Lonchura malacca (I)
- Chestnut munia (capucin à tête noire), Lonchura atricapilla (I)
- White-headed munia, Lonchura maja (I)
- Red avadavat (Bengali rouge), Amandava amandava (I)
- Orange-cheeked waxbill (Astrild à joues orange), Estrilda melpoda (I) (A)
- Common waxbill (Astrild ondulé), Estrilda astrild (I)
- Black-rumped waxbill (Astrild cendré), Estrilda troglodytes (I)

== Finches, euphonias, and allies ==
Order: Passeriformes Family: Fringillidae

Finches are seed-eating passerine birds, that are small to moderately large and have a strong beak, usually conical and in some species very large. All have twelve tail feathers and nine primaries. These birds have a bouncing flight with alternating bouts of flapping and gliding on closed wings, and most sing well.

- Lesser Antillean euphonia (organiste louis-d'or), Chlorophonia flavifrons (A)

== Troupials and allies ==
Order: Passeriformes Family: Icteridae

The icterids are a group of small to medium-sized, often colorful, passerine birds restricted to the New World and include the grackles, New World blackbirds, and New World orioles. Most species have black as the predominant plumage color, often enlivened by yellow, orange, or red.

- Bobolink (goglu des prés), Dolichonyx oryzivorus (A)
- Martinique oriole (oriole de la Martinique), Icterus bonana (E) (vulnerable)
- Baltimore oriole (oriole de Baltimore), Icterus galbula (A)
- Shiny cowbird (vacher luisant), Molothrus bonariensis (A)
- Carib grackle (quiscale merle), Quiscalus lugubris

== New World warblers ==
Order: Passeriformes Family: Parulidae

The New World warblers are a group of small, often colorful, passerine birds restricted to the New World. Most are arboreal, but some are terrestrial. Most members of this family are insectivores.

- Ovenbird (paruline couronnée), Seiurus aurocapilla (A)
- Louisiana waterthrush (paruline hochequeue), Parkesia motacilla (A)
- Northern waterthrush (paruline des ruisseaux), Parkesia noveboracensis (A)
- Black-and-white warbler (paruline noir et blanc), Mniotilta varia
- Prothonotary warbler (paruline orangée), Protonotaria citrea (A)
- Kentucky warbler (paruline du Kentucky), Geothlypis formosa (A)
- Hooded warbler (paruline à capuchon), Setophaga citrina (A)
- American redstart (paruline flamboyante), Setophaga ruticilla (A)
- Cape May warbler (paruline tigrée), Setophaga tigrina (A)
- Northern parula (paruline à collier), Setophaga americana (A)
- Yellow warbler (paruline jaune), Setophaga petechia
- Blackpoll warbler (paruline rayée), Setophaga striata (A) (near-threatened)
- Pine warbler (paruline des pins), Setophaga pinus (A)
- Yellow-rumped warbler (paruline à croupion jaune), Setophaga coronata (A)
- Prairie warbler (paruline des prés), Setophaga discolor (A)
- St. Lucia warbler (paruline de Sainte-Lucie), Setophaga delicata (A)
- Black-throated green warbler (paruline à gorge noire), Setophaga virens (A)
- Canada warbler (paruline du Canada), Cardellina canadensis (A)

== Cardinals and allies ==
Order: Passeriformes Family: Cardinalidae

The cardinals are a family of robust, seed-eating birds with strong bills. They are typically associated with open woodland. The sexes usually have distinct plumages.

- Summer tanager (piranga vermillon), Piranga rubra (A)
- Scarlet tanager (piranga écarlate), Piranga olivacea (A)
- Rose-breasted grosbeak (cardinal à poitrine rose), Pheucticus ludovicianus (A)

== Tanagers and allies ==
Order: Passeriformes Family: Thraupidae

The tanagers are a large group of small to medium-sized passerine birds restricted to the New World, mainly in the tropics. Many species are brightly colored. As a family they are omnivorous, but individual species specialize in eating fruits, seeds, insects, or other types of food. Most have short, rounded wings.

- Grassland yellow-finch (sicale des savanes), Sicalis luteola (I)
- Chestnut-bellied seed-finch, Sporophila angolensis (I)
- Bananaquit (sucrier à ventre jaune), Coereba flaveola
- Lesser Antillean bullfinch (sporophile rougegorge), Loxigilla noctis
- Black-faced grassquit (sporophile cici), Melanospiza bicolor
- Lesser Antillean saltator (saltator gros-bec), Saltator albicollis

== See also ==
- List of birds
- Lists of birds by region
