= List of birds of Germany =

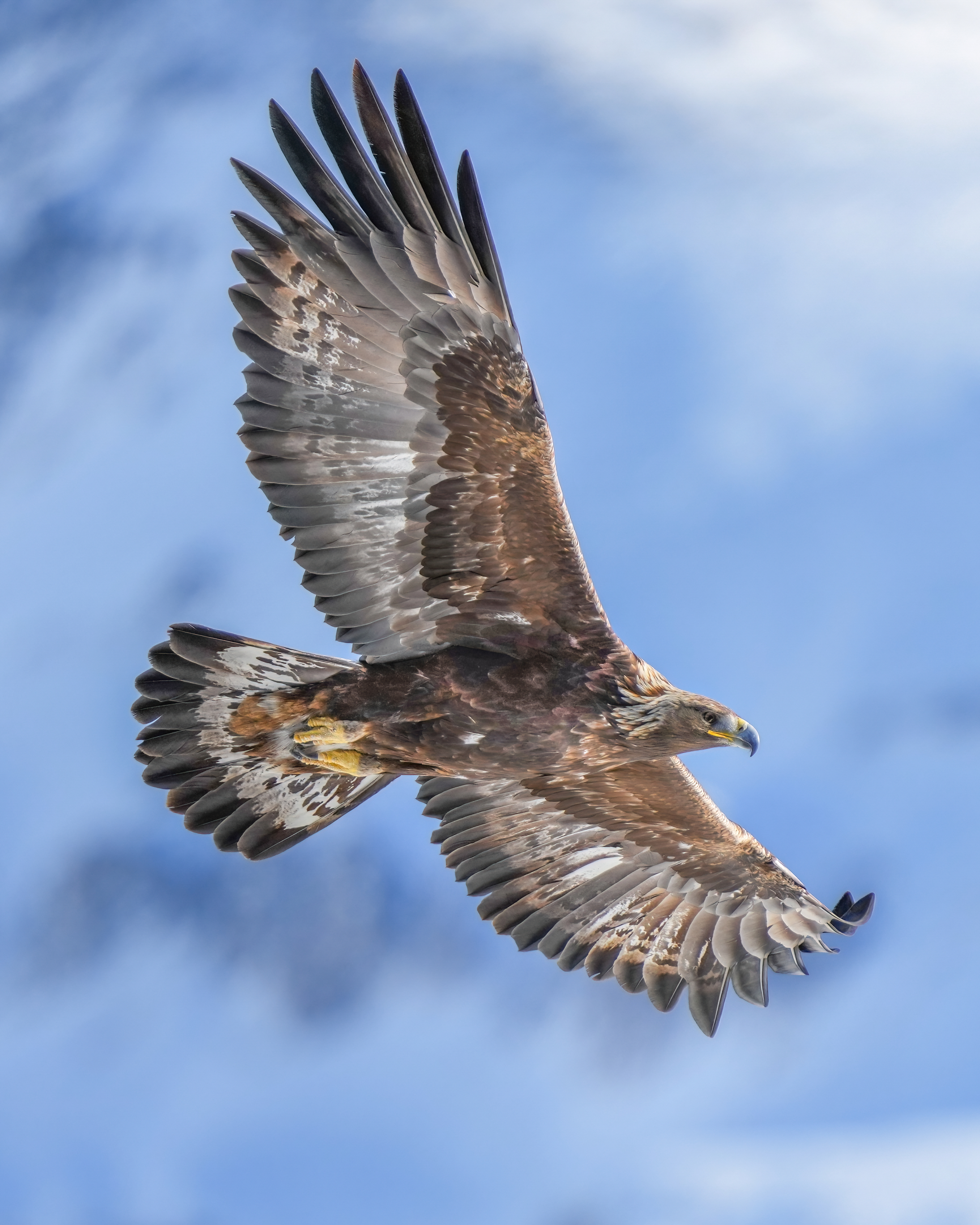
The Golden eagle (Steinadler) is the national bird of Germany

This is a list of the bird species recorded in Germany. The avifauna of Germany includes a total of 527 confirmed species as of December 2016, according to the German Ornithologists' Society (Deutsche Ornithologen-Gesellschaft (DO-G), published in October 2019; four more were added up to 2021. This list's taxonomic treatment (designation and sequence of orders, families and species) and nomenclature (English and scientific names) are those of the IOC World Bird List, version 9.2. Subsequent additions are from the following annual rare bird reports:

- Rare birds in Germany 2018 (Seltene Vogelarten in Deutschland 2018).
- Rare birds in Germany 2019 (Seltene Vogelarten in Deutschland 2019).
- Rare birds in Germany 2020 (Seltene Vogelarten in Deutschland 2020).
- Revision of the national reporting list of the German Avifaunistic Commission as of 1 January 2023 (Überarbeitung der nationalen Meldeliste der Deutschen Avifaunistischen Kommission zum 1. Januar 2023).

Bird species admitted to the German List are included in the following categories A, B or C, with the same definitions as the British and other Western Palaearctic bird lists:

- A: species that have been recorded in an apparently natural state at least once since 1 January 1950.
- B: species that were recorded in an apparently natural state at least once between 1 January 1800 and 31 December 1949, but have not been recorded subsequently.
- C: species introduced by humans, and have established breeding populations derived from introduced stock, which maintain themselves without necessary recourse to further introduction.

Categories D and E (uncertain and escaped species; see #Appendices) are used for record keeping only, and species in these categories are not included in the German List:

== Pheasants, grouse, and allies ==
Order: Galliformes Family: Phasianidae

The Phasianidae are a family of terrestrial birds which consists of grouse, quail, partridges, and pheasants. In general, they are plump (although they vary in size) and have broad, relatively short wings.

- Hazel grouse (Haselhuhn) Tetrastes bonasia – A
- Western capercaillie (Auerhuhn) Tetrao urogallus – A
- Black grouse (Birkhuhn) Lyrurus tetrix – A
- Rock ptarmigan (Alpenschneehuhn) Lagopus muta – A
- Rock partridge (Steinhuhn) Alectoris graeca – A
- Grey partridge (Rebhuhn) Perdix perdix – A
- Common quail (Wachtel) Coturnix coturnix – A
- Ring-necked pheasant (Fasan) Phasianus colchicus – C

== Ducks, geese, and waterfowl ==
Order: Anseriformes Family: Anatidae

Anatidae includes the ducks and most duck-like waterfowl, such as geese and swans. These birds are adapted to an aquatic existence with webbed feet, flattened bills, and feathers that are excellent at shedding water due to an oily coating.

- Brent goose (Ringelgans) Branta bernicla – A
- Red-breasted goose (Rothalsgans) Branta ruficollis – A
- Canada goose (Kanadagans) Branta canadensis – C
- Barnacle goose (Weißwangengans) Branta leucopsis – A
- Bar-headed goose (Streifengans) Anser indicus – C
- Greylag goose (Graugans) Anser anser – A
- Taiga bean goose (Waldsaatgans) Anser fabalis – A
- Pink-footed goose (Kurzschnabelgans) Anser brachyrhynchus – A
- Tundra bean goose (Tundrasaatgans) Anser serrirostris – A
- Greater white-fronted goose (Blässgans) Anser albifrons – A
- Lesser white-fronted goose (Zwerggans) Anser erythropus – A
- Mute swan (Höckerschwan) Cygnus olor – A
- Tundra swan (Zwergschwan) Cygnus columbianus – A
- Whooper swan (Singschwan) Cygnus cygnus – A
- Egyptian goose (Nilgans) Alopochen aegyptiacus – C
- Common shelduck (Brandgans) Tadorna tadorna – A
- Ruddy shelduck (Rostgans) Tadorna ferruginea – BC
- Mandarin duck (Mandarinente) Aix galericulata – C
- Garganey (Knäkente) Spatula querquedula – A
- Blue-winged teal (Blauflügelente) Spatula discors – A
- Northern shoveler (Löffelente) Spatula clypeata – A
- Gadwall (Schnatterente) Mareca strepera – A
- Eurasian wigeon (Pfeifente) Mareca penelope – A
- American wigeon (Canadapfeifente) Mareca americana – A
- Mallard (Stockente) Anas platyrhynchos – A
- Northern pintail (Spießente) Anas acuta – A
- Eurasian teal (Krickente) Anas crecca – A
- Green-winged teal (Carolinakrickente) Anas carolinensis – A
- Marbled teal (Marmelente) Marmaronetta angustirostris – B
- Red-crested pochard (Kolbenente) Netta rufina – A
- Common pochard (Tafelente) Aythya ferina – A
- Ferruginous duck (Moorente) Aythya nyroca – A
- Ring-necked duck (Ringschnabelente) Aythya collaris – A
- Tufted duck (Reiherente) Aythya fuligula – A
- Greater scaup (Bergente) Aythya marila – A
- Lesser scaup (KleineBergente) Aythya affinis – A
- Steller's eider (Scheckente) Polysticta stelleri – A
- King eider (Prachteiderente) Somateria spectabilis – A
- Common eider (Eiderente) Somateria mollissima – A
- Harlequin duck (Kragenente) Histrionicus histrionicus – B
- Surf scoter (Brillenente) Melanitta perspicillata – A
- Velvet scoter (Samtente) Melanitta fusca – A
- Stejneger's scoter (Kamtschatkasamtente) Melanitta stejnegeri – A
- Common scoter (Trauerente) Melanitta nigra – A
- Black scoter (Pazifiktrauerente) Melanitta americana – A
- Long-tailed duck (Eisente) Clangula hyemalis – A
- Common goldeneye (Schellente) Bucephala clangula – A
- Barrow's goldeneye (Spatelente) Bucephala islandica – B
- Smew (Zwergsäger) Mergellus albellus – A
- Goosander (Gänsesäger) Mergus merganser – A
- Red-breasted merganser (Mittelsäger) Mergus serrator – A
- Ruddy duck (Schwarzkopf-Ruderente) Oxyura jamaicensis – C
- White-headed duck (Weißkopf-Ruderente) Oxyura leucocephala – B

== Nightjars and allies ==
Order: Caprimulgiformes Family: Caprimulgidae

Nightjars are medium-sized nocturnal birds that usually nest on the ground. They have long wings, short legs, and very short bills. Most have small feet, of little use for walking, and long pointed wings. Their soft plumage is camouflaged to resemble bark or leaves.

- Eurasian nightjar (Ziegenmelker) Caprimulgus europaeus – A
- Egyptian nightjar (Pharaonenziegenmelker) Caprimulgus aegyptius – B

== Swifts ==
Order: Caprimulgiformes Family: Apodidae

Swifts are small birds which spend the majority of their lives flying. These birds have very short legs and never settle voluntarily on the ground, perching instead only on vertical surfaces. Many swifts have long swept-back wings which resemble a crescent or boomerang.

- Alpine swift (Alpensegler) Tachymarptis melba – A
- Common swift (Mauersegler) Apus apus – A
- Pallid swift (Fahlsegler) Apus pallidus – A
- Pacific swift (Pazifiksegler) Apus pacificus – A
- Little swift (Haussegler) Apus affinis – A

== Bustards ==
Order: Otidiformes Family: Otididae

Bustards are large terrestrial birds mainly associated with dry open country and steppes in the Old World. They are omnivorous and nest on the ground. They walk steadily on strong legs and big toes, pecking for food as they go. They have long broad wings with "fingered" wingtips and striking patterns in flight. Many have interesting mating displays.

- Great bustard (Großtrappe) Otis tarda – A
- MacQueen's bustard (Steppenkragentrappe) Chlamydotis macqueenii – A
- Little bustard (Zwergtrappe) Tetrax tetrax – A

== Cuckoos ==
Order: Cuculiformes Family: Cuculidae

The family Cuculidae includes cuckoos and allies. These birds are of variable size with slender bodies, long tails, and strong legs.

- Great spotted cuckoo (Häherkuckuck) Clamator glandarius – A
- Black-billed cuckoo (Schwarzschnabelkuckuck) Coccyzus erythropthalmus – A
- Common cuckoo (Kuckuck) Cuculus canorus – A

== Sandgrouse ==
Order: Pterocliformes Family: Pteroclidae

Sandgrouse have small, pigeon-like, heads and necks, but sturdy compact bodies. They have long pointed wings and sometimes tails and a fast direct flight. Flocks fly to watering holes at dawn and dusk. Their legs are feathered down to the toes.

- Pallas's sandgrouse (Steppenflughuhn) Syrrhaptes paradoxus – A
- Black-bellied sandgrouse (Sandflughuhn) Pterocles orientalis – B

== Pigeons and doves ==
Order: Columbiformes Family: Columbidae

Pigeons and doves are stout-bodied birds with short necks and short slender bills with a fleshy cere.

- Rock dove (Felsentaube) Columba livia – C
- Stock dove (Hohltaube) Columba oenas – A
- Common wood pigeon (Ringeltaube) Columba palumbus – A
- European turtle dove (Turteltaube) Streptopelia turtur – A
- Oriental turtle dove (Orientturteltaube) Streptopelia orientalis – A
- Eurasian collared dove (Türkentaube) Streptopelia decaocto – A
- Mourning dove (Carolinataube) Zenaida macroura – A

== Rails, moorhens, and coots ==
Order: Gruiformes Family: Rallidae

Rallidae is a large family of small to medium-sized birds which includes the rails, crakes, coots, and moorhens. Typically they inhabit dense vegetation in damp environments near lakes, swamps, or rivers. In general they are shy and secretive birds making them difficult to observe, but some are bold and conspicuous. Most species have strong legs and long toes which are well adapted to soft uneven surfaces. They tend to have short, rounded wings and appear to be weak fliers, though many are capable of long-distance migration.

- Water rail (Wasserralle) Rallus aquaticus – A
- Corn crake (Wachtelkönig) Crex crex – A
- Spotted crake (Tüpfelsumpfhuhn) Porzana porzana – A
- Little crake (Kleinsumpfhuhn) Zapornia parva – A
- Baillon's crake (Zwergsumpfhuhn) Zapornia pusilla – A
- Western swamphen (Purpurhuhn) Porphyrio porphyrio – B
- Grey-headed swamphen (Graukopf-Purpurhuhn) Porphyrio poliocephalus – A
- Allen's gallinule (Bronzesultanshuhn) Porphyrio alleni – B
- Common moorhen (Teichhuhn) Gallinula chloropus – A
- Eurasian coot (Blässhuhn) Fulica atra – A

== Cranes ==
Order: Gruiformes Family: Gruidae

Cranes are large, long-legged, and long-necked birds. Unlike the similar-looking but unrelated herons, cranes fly with necks outstretched, not pulled back. Most have elaborate and noisy courting displays or "dances".

- Sandhill crane (Kanadakranich) Antigone canadensis – A
- Demoiselle crane (Jungfernkranich) Anthropoides virgo – B
- Common crane (Kranich) Grus grus – A

== Grebes ==
Order: Podicipediformes Family: Podicipedidae

Grebes are small to medium-large freshwater diving birds. They have lobed toes and are excellent swimmers and divers. However, they have their feet placed far back on the body, making them quite ungainly on land.

- Little grebe (Zwergtaucher) Tachybaptus ruficollis – A
- Pied-billed grebe (Bindentaucher) Podilymbus podiceps – A
- Red-necked grebe (Rothalstaucher) Podiceps grisegena – A
- Great crested grebe (Haubentaucher) Podiceps cristatus – A
- Slavonian grebe (Ohrentaucher) Podiceps auritus – A
- Black-necked grebe (Schwarzhalstaucher) Podiceps nigricollis – A

== Flamingos ==
Order: Phoenicopteriformes Family: Phoenicopteridae

Flamingos are gregarious wading birds, usually 1 to 1.5 metres (3 ft 3 in to 4 ft 11 in) high, found in both the Western and Eastern Hemispheres. Flamingos filter-feed on shellfish and algae. Their oddly shaped beaks are specially adapted to separate mud and silt from the food they consume and, uniquely, are used upside-down.

- Greater flamingo (Rosaflamingo) Phoenicopterus roseus – A

== Stone-curlews ==
Order: Charadriiformes Family: Burhinidae

The stone-curlews and thick-knees are a group of waders found worldwide within the tropical zone, with some species also breeding in temperate Europe and Australia. They are medium to large waders with strong black or yellow-black bills, large yellow eyes, and cryptic plumage. Despite being classed as waders, most species have a preference for arid or semi-arid habitats.

- Eurasian stone-curlew (Triel) Burhinus oedicnemus – A

== Oystercatchers ==
Order: Charadriiformes Family: Haematopodidae

The oystercatchers are large and noisy plover-like birds with strong bills used for smashing or prising open molluscs.

- Eurasian oystercatcher (Austernfischer) Haematopus ostralegus – A

== Stilts and avocets ==
Order: Charadriiformes Family: Recurvirostridae

Recurvirostridae is a family of large wading birds which includes the avocets and stilts. The avocets have long legs and long up-curved bills. The stilts have extremely long legs and long, thin, straight bills.

- Black-winged stilt (Stelzenläufer) Himantopus himantopus – A
- Pied avocet (Säbelschnäbler) Recurvirostra avosetta – A

== Plovers and lapwings ==
Order: Charadriiformes Family: Charadriidae

The family Charadriidae includes the plovers, dotterels and lapwings. They are small to medium-sized birds with compact bodies, short, thick necks and long, usually pointed, wings. They are found in open country worldwide, mostly in habitats near water.

- Northern lapwing (Kiebitz) Vanellus vanellus – A
- Sociable lapwing (Steppenkiebitz) Vanellus gregarius – A
- White-tailed lapwing (Weißschwanzkiebitz) Vanellus leucurus – A
- European golden plover (Goldregenpfeifer) Pluvialis apricaria – A
- Pacific golden plover (Tundra-Goldregenpfeifer) Pluvialis fulva – A
- American golden plover (Prärie-Goldregenpfeifer) Pluvialis dominica – A
- Grey plover (Kiebitzregenpfeifer) Pluvialis squatarola – A
- Common ringed plover (Sandregenpfeifer) Charadrius hiaticula – A
- Little ringed plover (Flussregenpfeifer) Charadrius dubius – A
- Kentish plover (Seeregenpfeifer) Charadrius alexandrinus – A
- Siberian sand plover (Kolymaregenpfeifer) Charadrius mongolus – A
- Greater sand plover (Wüstenregenpfeifer) Charadrius leschenaultii – A
- Caspian plover (Wermutregenpfeifer) Charadrius asiaticus – B
- Eurasian dotterel (Mornellregenpfeifer) Charadrius morinellus – A

== Sandpipers and allies ==
Order: Charadriiformes Family: Scolopacidae

Scolopacidae is a large diverse family of small to medium-sized shorebirds including the sandpipers, curlews, godwits, shanks, woodcock, snipes, dowitchers, and phalaropes. The majority of these species eat small invertebrates picked out of the mud or soil. Variation in length of legs and bills enables multiple species to feed in the same habitat, particularly on the coast, without direct competition for food.

- Upland sandpiper (Prärieläufer) Bartramia longicauda – B
- Eurasian whimbrel (Regenbrachvogel) Numenius phaeopus – A
- Slender-billed curlew (Dünnschnabel-Brachvogel) Numenius tenuirostris – B
- Eurasian curlew (Brachvogel) Numenius arquata – A
- Bar-tailed godwit (Pfuhlschnepfe) Limosa lapponica – A
- Black-tailed godwit (Uferschnepfe) Limosa limosa – A
- Ruddy turnstone (Steinwälzer) Arenaria interpres – A
- Great knot (Anadyrknutt) Calidris tenuirostris – A
- Red knot (Knutt) Calidris canutus – A
- Ruff (Kampfläufer) Calidris pugnax – A
- Broad-billed sandpiper (Sumpfläufer) Calidris falcinellus – A
- Sharp-tailed sandpiper (Spitzschwanz-Strandläufer) Calidris acuminata – A
- Stilt sandpiper (Bindenstrandläufer) Calidris himantopus – A
- Curlew sandpiper (Sichelstrandläufer) Calidris ferruginea – A
- Temminck's stint (Temminckstrandläufer) Calidris temminckii – A
- Long-toed stint (Langzehen-Strandläufer) Calidris subminuta – A
- Red-necked stint (Rotkehl-Strandläufer) Calidris ruficollis – A
- Sanderling (Sanderling) Calidris alba – A
- Dunlin (Alpenstrandläufer) Calidris alpina – A
- Purple sandpiper (Meerstrandläufer) Calidris maritima – A
- Baird's sandpiper (Bairdstrandläufer) Calidris bairdii – A
- Little stint (Zwergstrandläufer) Calidris minuta – A
- Least sandpiper (Wiesenstrandläufer) Calidris minutilla – A
- White-rumped sandpiper (Weißbürzel-Strandläufer) Calidris fuscicollis – A
- Buff-breasted sandpiper (Grasläufer) Calidris subruficollis – A
- Pectoral sandpiper (Graubrust-Strandläufer) Calidris melanotos – A
- Semipalmated sandpiper (Sandstrandläufer) Calidris pusilla – A
- Long-billed dowitcher (Tundraschlammläufer) Limnodromus scolopaceus – A
- Short-billed dowitcher (Moorschlammläufer) Limnodromus griseus – A
- Eurasian woodcock (Waldschnepfe) Scolopax rusticola – A
- Jack snipe (Zwergschnepfe) Lymnocryptes minimus – A
- Great snipe (Doppelschnepfe) Gallinago media – A
- Common snipe (Bekassine) Gallinago gallinago – A
- Terek sandpiper (Terekwasserläufer) Xenus cinereus – A
- Wilson's phalarope (Wilsonwassertreter) Phalaropus tricolor – A
- Red-necked phalarope (Odinshühnchen) Phalaropus lobatus – A
- Red phalarope (Thorshühnchen) Phalaropus fulicarius – A
- Common sandpiper (Flussuferläufer) Actitis hypoleucos – A
- Spotted sandpiper (Drosseluferläufer) Actitis macularius – A
- Green sandpiper (Waldwasserläufer) Tringa ochropus – A
- Lesser yellowlegs (Gelbschenkel) Tringa flavipes – A
- Common redshank (Rotschenkel) Tringa totanus – A
- Marsh sandpiper (Teichwasserläufer) Tringa stagnatilis – A
- Wood sandpiper (Bruchwasserläufer) Tringa glareola – A
- Spotted redshank (DunklerWasserläufer) Tringa erythropus – A
- Common greenshank (Grünschenkel) Tringa nebularia – A

== Pratincoles and coursers ==
Order: Charadriiformes Family: Glareolidae

Glareolidae is a family of wading birds comprising the pratincoles, which have short legs, long pointed wings, and long forked tails, and the coursers, which have long legs, short wings, and long, pointed bills which curve downwards.

- Cream-coloured courser (Rennvogel) Cursorius cursor – A
- Collared pratincole (Rotflügel-Brachschwalbe) Glareola pratincola – A
- Black-winged pratincole (Schwarzflügel-Brachschwalbe) Glareola nordmanni – A

== Gulls and terns ==
Order: Charadriiformes Family: Laridae

Laridae is a family of medium to large seabirds, the gulls, terns, and allies. Gulls are typically grey or white, often with black markings on the head or wings. They have stout, longish bills and webbed feet. Terns are a group of generally medium to small seabirds typically with grey or white plumage, often with black markings on the head, and a long, slender bill. Most terns hunt fish by diving but some pick insects off the surface of fresh water. Gulls and terns are generally long-lived birds, with several species known to live in excess of 30 years.

- Brown noddy (Noddi) Anous stolidus – B
- Black-legged kittiwake (Dreizehenmöwe) Rissa tridactyla – A
- Ivory gull (Elfenbeinmöwe) Pagophila eburnea – A
- Sabine's gull (Schwalbenmöwe) Xema sabini – A
- Slender-billed gull (Dünnschnabelmöwe) Chroicocephalus genei – A
- Bonaparte's gull (Bonapartemöwe) Chroicocephalus philadelphia – A
- Black-headed gull (Lachmöwe) Chroicocephalus ridibundus – A
- Little gull (Zwergmöwe) Hydrocoloeus minutus – A
- Ross's gull (Rosenmöwe) Rhodostethia rosea – A
- Laughing gull (Aztekenmöwe) Leucophaeus atricilla – A
- Franklin's gull (Präriemöwe) Leucophaeus pipixcan – A
- Audouin's gull (Korallenmöwe) Ichthyaetus audouinii – A
- Mediterranean gull (Schwarzkopfmöwe) Ichthyaetus melanocephalus – A
- Pallas's gull (Fischmöwe) Ichthyaetus ichthyaetus – A
- Common gull (Sturmmöwe) Larus canus – A
- Ring-billed gull (Ringschnabelmöwe) Larus delawarensis – A
- Great black-backed gull (Mantelmöwe) Larus marinus – A
- Glaucous gull (Eismöwe) Larus hyperboreus – A
- Iceland gull (Polarmöwe) Larus glaucoides – A
- European herring gull (Silbermöwe) Larus argentatus – A
- American herring gull (Kanadamöwe) Larus smithsonianus – A
- Caspian gull (Steppenmöwe) Larus cachinnans – A
- Yellow-legged gull (Mittelmeermöwe) Larus michahellis – A
- Lesser black-backed gull (Heringsmöwe) Larus fuscus – A
- Gull-billed tern (Lachseeschwalbe) Gelochelidon nilotica – A
- Caspian tern (Raubseeschwalbe) Hydroprogne caspia – A
- Lesser crested tern (Rüppellseeschwalbe) Thalasseus bengalensis – A
- Sandwich tern (Brandseeschwalbe) Thalasseus sandvicensis – A
- Elegant tern (Schmuckseeschwalbe) Thalasseus elegans – A
- Little tern (Zwergseeschwalbe) Sternula albifrons – A
- Bridled tern (Zügelseeschwalbe) Onychoprion anaethetus – A
- Sooty tern (Rußseeschwalbe) Onychoprion fuscatus – A
- Roseate tern (Rosenseeschwalbe) Sterna dougallii – A
- Common tern (Flussseeschwalbe) Sterna hirundo – A
- Arctic tern (Küstenseeschwalbe) Sterna paradisaea – A
- Whiskered tern (Weißbart-Seeschwalbe) Chlidonias hybrida – A
- White-winged tern (Weißflügel-Seeschwalbe) Chlidonias leucopterus – A
- Black tern (Trauerseeschwalbe) Chlidonias niger – A

== Skuas ==
Order: Charadriiformes Family: Stercorariidae

The family Stercorariidae are, in general, medium to large birds, typically with grey or brown plumage, often with white markings on the wings. They nest on the ground in subarctic and arctic regions; many are mostly long-distance migrants.

- Great skua (Skua) Stercorarius skua – A
- Pomarine skua (Spatelraubmöwe) Stercorarius pomarinus – A
- Arctic skua (Schmarotzerraubmöwe) Stercorarius parasiticus – A
- Long-tailed skua (Falkenraubmöwe) Stercorarius longicaudus – A

== Auks, guillemot, and puffins ==
Order: Charadriiformes Family: Alcidae

Alcids are superficially similar to penguins due to their black-and-white colours, their upright posture, and some of their habits, however they are not related to the penguins and differ in being able to fly. Auks live on the open sea, only deliberately coming ashore to nest.

- Little auk (Krabbentaucher) Alle alle – A
- Brünnich's guillemot (Dickschnabellumme) Uria lomvia – A
- Common guillemot (Trottellumme) Uria aalge – A
- Razorbill (Tordalk) Alca torda – A
- Black guillemot (Gryllteiste) Cepphus grylle – A
- Atlantic puffin (Papageitaucher) Fratercula arctica – A

== Divers ==
Order: Gaviiformes Family: Gaviidae

Divers, also called loons, are a group of aquatic birds found in many parts of North America and northern Europe. They are the size of a large duck or small goose, which they somewhat resemble when swimming, but to which they are completely unrelated.

- Red-throated diver (Sterntaucher) Gavia stellata – A
- Black-throated diver (Prachttaucher) Gavia arctica – A
- Great northern diver (Eistaucher) Gavia immer – A
- White-billed diver (Gelbschnabeltaucher) Gavia adamsii – A

== Southern storm petrels ==
Order: Procellariiformes Family: Oceanitidae

The storm petrels are the smallest seabirds, relatives of the petrels, feeding on planktonic crustaceans and small fish picked from the surface, typically while hovering. The flight is fluttering and sometimes bat-like. Until 2018, this family's species were included with the other storm-petrels in family Hydrobatidae.

- Wilson's storm petrel (Buntfuß-Sturmschwalbe) Oceanites oceanicus – A

== Albatrosses ==
Order: Procellariiformes Family: Diomedeidae

The albatrosses are among the largest of flying birds, and the great albatrosses from the genus Diomedea have the largest wingspans of any extant birds.

- Black-browed albatross (Schwarzbrauenalbatros) Thalassarche melanophris – A

== Northern storm petrels ==
Order: Procellariiformes Family: Hydrobatidae

Though the members of this family are similar in many respects to the southern storm petrels, including their general appearance and habits, there are enough genetic differences to warrant their placement in a separate family.

- European storm petrel (Sturmwellenläufer) Hydrobates pelagicus – A
- Leach's storm petrel (Wellenläufer) Hydrobates leucorhous
- Swinhoe's storm petrel (Swinhoewellenläufer) Hydrobates monorhis – A

== Shearwaters and petrels ==
Order: Procellariiformes Family: Procellariidae

The procellariids are the main group of medium-sized "true petrels", characterised by united nostrils with medium septum and a long outer functional primary.

- Northern fulmar (Eissturmvogel) Fulmarus glacialis – A
- Scopoli's shearwater (Sepiasturmtaucher) Calonectris diomedea – B
- Cory's shearwater (Corysturmtaucher) Calonectris borealis – A
- Sooty shearwater (Dunkelsturmtaucher) Ardenna grisea – A
- Great shearwater (Kappensturmtaucher) Ardenna gravis – A
- Manx shearwater (Atlantiksturmtaucher) Puffinus puffinus – A
- Balearic shearwater (Balearensturmtaucher) Puffinus mauretanicus – A
- Barolo shearwater (Barolosturmtaucher) Puffinus baroli – A
- Bulwer's petrel (Bulwersturmvogel) Bulweria bulwerii – A

== Storks ==
Order: Ciconiiformes Family: Ciconiidae

Storks are large, long-legged, long-necked, wading birds with long, stout bills. Storks are mute, but bill-clattering is an important mode of communication at the nest. Their nests can be large and may be reused for many years. Many species are migratory.

- White stork (Weißstorch) Ciconia ciconia – A
- Black stork (Schwarzstorch) Ciconia nigra – A

== Boobies and gannets ==
Order: Suliformes Family: Sulidae

The sulids comprise the gannets and boobies. Both groups are medium to large coastal seabirds that plunge-dive for fish.

- Northern gannet (Basstölpel) Morus bassanus (A)
- Brown booby (Weißbauchtölpel) Sula leucogaster (A)

== Cormorants and shags ==
Order: Suliformes Family: Phalacrocoracidae

Phalacrocoracidae is a family of medium to large coastal, fish-eating seabirds that includes cormorants and shags. Plumage colouration varies, with the majority having mainly dark plumage, some species being black-and-white, and a few being colourful.

- Pygmy cormorant (Zwergscharbe) Microcarbo pygmeus – A
- European shag (Krähenscharbe) Gulosus aristotelis – A
- Great cormorant (Kormoran) Phalacrocorax carbo – A

== Ibises and spoonbills ==
Order: Pelecaniformes Family: Threskiornithidae

Threskiornithidae is a family of large terrestrial and wading birds which includes the ibises and spoonbills. They have long, broad wings with 11 primary and about 20 secondary feathers. They are strong fliers and despite their size and weight, very capable soarers.

- Glossy ibis (Sichler) Plegadis falcinellus – A
- Eurasian spoonbill (Löffler) Platalea leucorodia – A

== Herons, egrets, and bitterns ==
Order: Pelecaniformes Family: Ardeidae

The family Ardeidae contains the bitterns, herons, and egrets. Herons and egrets are medium to large wetland birds with long necks and legs. Bitterns tend to be shorter necked and more wary. Members of Ardeidae fly with their necks retracted, unlike other long-necked birds such as storks, ibises, and spoonbills.

- Great bittern (Rohrdommel) Botaurus stellaris – A
- Little bittern (Zwergdommel) Ixobrychus minutus – A
- Black-crowned night heron (Nachtreiher) Nycticorax nycticorax – A
- Squacco heron (Rallenreiher) Ardeola ralloides – A
- Cattle egret (Kuhreiher) Bubulcus ibis – A
- Grey heron (Graureiher) Ardea cinerea – A
- Purple heron (Purpurreiher) Ardea purpurea – A
- Great egret (Silberreiher) Ardea alba – A
- Little egret (Seidenreiher) Egretta garzetta – A

== Pelicans ==
Order: Pelecaniformes Family: Pelecanidae

Pelicans are large water birds with a distinctive pouch under their beak. They have webbed feet with four toes.

- Great white pelican (Rosapelikan) Pelecanus onocrotalus – B
- Dalmatian pelican (Krauskopfpelikan) Pelecanus crispus – A

== Osprey ==
Order: Accipitriformes Family: Pandionidae

The family Pandionidae contains only one species, the osprey. The osprey is a medium-large raptor which is a specialist fish-eater with a worldwide distribution.

- Osprey (Fischadler) Pandion haliaetus – A

== Hawks, eagles, and kites ==
Order: Accipitriformes Family: Accipitridae

Accipitridae is a family of birds of prey, which includes hawks, eagles, kites, harriers, and Old World vultures. These birds have powerful hooked beaks for tearing flesh from their prey, strong legs, powerful talons, and keen eyesight.

- Black-winged kite (Gleitaar) Elanus caeruleus – A
- Bearded vulture (Bartgeier) Gypaetus barbatus – B
- Egyptian vulture (Schmutzgeier) Neophron percnopterus – A
- European honey buzzard (Wespenbussard) Pernis apivorus – A
- Griffon vulture (Gänsegeier) Gyps fulvus – A
- Eurasian black vulture (Mönchsgeier) Aegypius monachus – B
- Short-toed snake eagle (Schlangenadler) Circaetus gallicus – A
- Lesser spotted eagle (Schreiadler) Clanga pomarina – A
- Greater spotted eagle (Schelladler) Clanga clanga – A
- Booted eagle (Zwergadler) Hieraaetus pennatus – A
- Steppe eagle (Steppenadler) Aquila nipalensis – A
- Imperial eagle (Kaiseradler) Aquila heliaca – A
- Golden eagle (Steinadler) Aquila chrysaetos – A
- Bonelli's eagle (Habichtsadler) Aquila fasciata – A
- Eurasian sparrowhawk (Sperber) Accipiter nisus – A
- Northern goshawk (Habicht) Accipiter gentilis – A
- Eurasian marsh harrier (Rohrweihe) Circus aeruginosus – A
- Hen harrier (Kornweihe) Circus cyaneus – A
- Pallid harrier (Steppenweihe) Circus macrourus – A
- Montagu's harrier (Wiesenweihe) Circus pygargus – A
- Red kite (Rotmilan) Milvus milvus – A
- Black kite (Schwarzmilan) Milvus migrans – A
- White-tailed eagle (Seeadler) Haliaeetus albicilla – A
- Rough-legged buzzard (Raufußbussard) Buteo lagopus – A
- Long-legged buzzard (Adlerbussard) Buteo rufinus – A
- Common buzzard (Mäusebussard) Buteo buteo – A

== Barn owls ==
Order: Strigiformes Family: Tytonidae

Barn owls are medium to large owls with large heads and characteristic heart-shaped faces. They have long strong legs with powerful talons.

- Western barn owl (Schleiereule) Tyto alba – A

== Owls ==
Order: Strigiformes Family: Strigidae

The typical owls are small to large solitary nocturnal birds of prey. They have large forward-facing eyes and ears, a hawk-like beak, and a conspicuous circle of feathers around each eye called a facial disk.

- Eurasian scops owl (Zwergohreule) Otus scops – A
- Snowy owl (Schnee-Eule) Bubo scandiacus – A
- Eurasian eagle-owl (Uhu) Bubo bubo – A
- Tawny owl (Waldkauz) Strix aluco – A
- Ural owl (Habichtskauz) Strix uralensis – B
- Northern hawk owl (Sperbereule) Surnia ulula – A
- Eurasian pygmy owl (Sperlingskauz) Glaucidium passerinum – A
- Little owl (Steinkauz) Athene noctua – A
- Boreal owl (Raufußkauz) Aegolius funereus – A
- Long-eared owl (Waldohreule) Asio otus – A
- Short-eared owl (Sumpfohreule) Asio flammeus – A

== Hoopoes ==
Order: Bucerotiformes Family: Upupidae

Hoopoes have black, white, and orangey-pink colouring with a large erectile crest on their head.

- Eurasian hoopoe (Wiedehopf) Upupa epops – A

== Rollers ==
Order: Coraciiformes Family: Coraciidae

Rollers resemble crows in size and build, but are more closely related to the kingfishers and bee-eaters. They share the colourful appearance of those groups with blues and browns predominating. The two inner front toes are connected, but the outer toe is not.

- European roller (Blauracke) Coracias garrulus – A

== Kingfishers ==
Order: Coraciiformes Family: Alcedinidae

Kingfishers are medium-sized birds with large heads, long pointed bills, short legs, and stubby tails.

- Common kingfisher (Eisvogel) Alcedo atthis – A

== Bee-eaters ==
Order: Coraciiformes Family: Meropidae

The bee-eaters are a group of coraciiform birds found mostly in Africa, but others occur in southern Europe, Madagascar, Australia, and New Guinea. They are characterised by richly coloured plumage, slender bodies, and usually elongated central tail feathers. All are colourful and have long downturned bills and pointed wings, which give them a swallow-like appearance when seen from afar. coraciiform

- Blue-cheeked bee-eater (Blauwangenspint) Merops persicus – A
- European bee-eater (Bienenfresser) Merops apiaster – A

== Woodpeckers ==
Order: Piciformes Family: Picidae

Woodpeckers are small to medium-sized birds with chisel-like beaks, short legs, stiff tails, and long tongues used for capturing insects. Some species have feet with two toes pointing forward and two backward, while several species have only three toes. Many woodpeckers have the habit of tapping noisily on tree trunks with their beaks.

- Eurasian wryneck (Wendehals) Jynx torquilla – A
- Eurasian three-toed woodpecker (Dreizehenspecht) Picoides tridactylus – A
- Middle spotted woodpecker (Mittelspecht) Dendrocoptes medius – A
- Lesser spotted woodpecker (Kleinspecht) Dryobates minor – A
- Syrian woodpecker (Blutspecht) Dendrocopos syriacus – A
- Great spotted woodpecker (Buntspecht) Dendrocopos major – A
- White-backed woodpecker (Weißrückenspecht) Dendrocopos leucotos – A
- Black woodpecker (Schwarzspecht) Dryocopus martius – A
- Eurasian green woodpecker (Grünspecht) Picus viridis – A
- Grey-headed woodpecker (Grauspecht) Picus canus – A

== Falcons and caracaras ==
Order: Falconiformes Family: Falconidae

Falconidae is a family of diurnal birds of prey. They differ from hawks, eagles, and kites in that they kill with their beaks instead of their talons.

- Lesser kestrel (Rötelfalke) Falco naumanni – A
- Eurasian kestrel (Turmfalke) Falco tinnunculus – A
- Red-footed falcon (Rotfußfalke) Falco vespertinus – A
- Eleonora's falcon (Eleonorenfalke) Falco eleonorae – A
- Merlin (Merlin) Falco columbarius – A
- Eurasian hobby (Baumfalke) Falco subbuteo – A
- Saker falcon (Würgfalke) Falco cherrug – A
- Gyrfalcon (Gerfalke) Falco rusticolus – A
- Peregrine falcon (Wanderfalke) Falco peregrinus – A

== Old World parrots ==
Order: Psittaciformes Family: Psittaculidae

Characteristic features of parrots include a strong curved bill, an upright stance, strong legs, and clawed zygodactyl feet. Many parrots are vividly coloured, and some are multi-coloured. In size they range from 8 cm (3.1 in) to 1 m (3.3 ft) in length. Old World parrots are found from Africa east across south and southeast Asia and Oceania to Australia and New Zealand.

- Rose-ringed parakeet (Halsbandsittich) Psittacula krameri – C

== Shrikes ==
Order: Passeriformes Family: Laniidae

Shrikes are passerine birds known for their habit of catching small birds and mammals and large insects, and impaling the uneaten portions of their bodies on thorns. A shrike's beak is hooked, like that of a typical bird of prey.

- Brown shrike (Braunwürger) Lanius cristatus – A
- Red-backed shrike (Neuntöter) Lanius collurio – A
- Isabelline shrike (Isabellwürger) Lanius isabellinus – A
- Red-tailed shrike (Turkestanwürger) Lanius phoenicuroides – A
- Lesser grey shrike (Schwarzstirnwürger) Lanius minor – A
- Great grey shrike (Raubwürger) Lanius excubitor – A
- Woodchat shrike (Rotkopfwürger) Lanius senator – A
- Masked shrike (Maskenwürger) Lanius nubicus – A

== Vireos, shrike-babblers, and erpornis ==
Order: Passeriformes Family: Vireonidae

The vireos are a group of small to medium-sized passerine birds restricted to the New World. They are typically greenish in colour and resemble wood warblers apart from their heavier bills.

- Yellow-throated vireo (Gelbkehlvireo) Vireo flavifrons – A
- Red-eyed vireo (Rotaugenvireo) Vireo olivaceus – A

== Old World orioles ==
Order: Passeriformes Family: Oriolidae

The Old World orioles are colourful passerine birds. They are not related to the New World orioles.

- Eurasian golden oriole (Pirol) Oriolus oriolus – A

== Crows, jays, and magpies ==
Order: Passeriformes Family: Corvidae

The family Corvidae includes crows, ravens, jays, choughs, magpies, and nutcrackers. Corvids are above average in size among the Passeriformes, and some of the larger species show high levels of intelligence and remarkable spatial memory.

- Eurasian jay (Eichelhäher) Garrulus glandarius – A
- Eurasian magpie (Elster) Pica pica – A
- Eurasian nutcracker (Tannenhäher) Nucifraga caryocatactes – A
- Red-billed chough (Alpenkrähe) Pyrrhocorax pyrrhocorax – B
- Alpine chough (Alpendohle) Pyrrhocorax graculus – A
- Eurasian jackdaw (Dohle) Coloeus monedula – A
- Rook (Saatkrähe) Corvus frugilegus – A
- Carrion crow (Rabenkrähe) Corvus corone – A
- Hooded crow (Nebelkrähe) Corvus cornix – A
- Common raven (Kolkrabe) Corvus corax – A

== Waxwings ==
Order: Passeriformes Family: Bombycillidae

The waxwings are a group of birds with soft silky plumage and unique red tips to some of the wing feathers. These tips look like sealing wax and give the group its name. These are arboreal birds of northern forests. They live on insects in summer and berries in winter.

- Bohemian waxwing (Seidenschwanz) Bombycilla garrulus – A

== Tits ==
Order: Passeriformes Family: Paridae

The tits are mainly small stocky woodland species with short stout bills. Some have crests. They are adaptable birds, with a mixed diet including seeds and insects.

- Coal tit (Tannenmeise) Periparus ater – A
- Crested tit (Haubenmeise) Lophophanes cristatus – A
- Marsh tit (Sumpfmeise) Poecile palustris – A
- Willow tit (Weidenmeise) Poecile montana – A
- Eurasian blue tit (Blaumeise) Cyanistes caeruleus – A
- Azure tit (Lasurmeise) Cyanistes cyanus – A
- Great tit (Kohlmeise) Parus major – A

== Penduline tits ==
Order: Passeriformes Family: Remizidae

The penduline tits are a group of small passerine birds related to the true tits. They are insectivores.

- Eurasian penduline tit (Beutelmeise) Remiz pendulinus – A

== Bearded reedling ==
Order: Passeriformes Family: Panuridae

This species, the only one in its family, is found in reed beds throughout temperate Europe and Asia.

- Bearded reedling (Bartmeise) Panurus biarmicus – A

== Larks ==
Order: Passeriformes Family: Alaudidae

Larks are small terrestrial birds with often extravagant songs and display flights. Most larks are fairly dull in appearance. Their food is insects and seeds.

- Wood lark (Heidelerche) Lullula arborea – A
- White-winged lark (Weißflügellerche) Alauda leucoptera – B
- Eurasian skylark (Feldlerche) Alauda arvensis – A
- Crested lark (Haubenlerche) Galerida cristata – A
- Shore lark (Ohrenlerche) Eremophila alpestris – A
- Greater short-toed lark (Kurzzehenlerche) Calandrella brachydactyla – A
- Bimaculated lark (Bergkalanderlerche) Melanocorypha bimaculata – A
- Calandra lark (Kalanderlerche) Melanocorypha calandra – A
- Black lark (Schwarzsteppenlerche) Melanocorypha yeltoniensis – A
- Mediterranean short-toed lark (Stummellerche) Alaudala rufescens – B

== Swallows ==
Order: Passeriformes Family: Hirundinidae

The family Hirundinidae is adapted to aerial feeding. They have a slender streamlined body, long pointed wings, and a short bill with a wide gape. The feet are adapted to perching rather than walking, and the front toes are partially joined at the base.

- Sand martin (Uferschwalbe) Riparia riparia – A
- Barn swallow (Rauchschwalbe) Hirundo rustica – A
- Eurasian crag martin (Felsenschwalbe) Ptyonoprogne rupestris – A
- Common house martin (Mehlschwalbe) Delichon urbica – A
- European red-rumped swallow (Rötelschwalbe) Cecropis rufula – A

== Bush warblers and allies ==
Order: Passeriformes Family: Cettiidae

The members of this family are found mostly in Africa and Asia with a few species in Europe and Polynesia.

- Cetti's warbler (Seidensänger) Cettia cetti – A

== Long-tailed tits ==
Order: Passeriformes Family: Aegithalidae

Long-tailed tits are a group of small passerine birds with medium to long tails. They make woven bag nests in trees. Most eat a mixed diet which includes insects.

- Long-tailed tit (Schwanzmeise) Aegithalos caudatus – A

== Leaf warblers ==
Order: Passeriformes Family: Phylloscopidae

Leaf warblers are a family of small insectivorous birds found mostly in Eurasia and ranging into Wallacea and Africa. The species are of various sizes, often green-plumaged above and yellow below, or more subdued with greyish-green to greyish-brown colours.

- Wood warbler (Waldlaubsänger) Phylloscopus sibilatrix – A
- Western Bonelli's warbler (Berglaubsänger) Phylloscopus bonelli – A
- Hume's warbler (Tienshanlaubsänger) Phylloscopus humei – A
- Yellow-browed warbler (Gelbbrauen-Laubsänger) Phylloscopus inornatus – A
- Pallas's leaf warbler (Goldhähnchen-Laubsänger) Phylloscopus proregulus – A
- Radde's warbler (Bartlaubsänger) Phylloscopus schwarzi – A
- Dusky warbler (Dunkellaubsänger) Phylloscopus fuscatus – A
- Willow warbler (Fitis) Phylloscopus trochilus – A
- Common chiffchaff (Zilpzalp) Phylloscopus collybita – A
- Iberian chiffchaff (IberischerZilpzalp) Phylloscopus ibericus – A
- Eastern crowned warbler (Kronenlaubsänger) Phylloscopus coronatus – A
- Green warbler (Wacholderlaubsänger) Phylloscopus nitidus – A
- Two-barred warbler (Middendorff-Laubsänger) Phylloscopus plumbeitarsus – A
- Greenish warbler (Grünlaubsänger) Phylloscopus trochiloides – A
- Arctic warbler (Wanderlaubsänger) Phylloscopus borealis – A

== Reed warblers and allies ==
Order: Passeriformes Family: Acrocephalidae

The members of this family are usually rather large for "warblers". Most are rather plain olivaceous brown above with much yellow to beige below. They are usually found in open woodland, reedbeds, or tall grass. The family occurs mostly in southern to western Eurasia and surroundings, but it also ranges far into the Pacific, with some species in Africa.

- Great reed warbler (Drosselrohrsänger) Acrocephalus arundinaceus – A
- Moustached warbler (Mariskenrohrsänger) Acrocephalus melanopogon – A
- Aquatic warbler (Seggenrohrsänger) Acrocephalus paludicola – A
- Sedge warbler (Schilfrohrsänger) Acrocephalus schoenobaenus – A
- Paddyfield warbler (Feldrohrsänger) Acrocephalus agricola – A
- Blyth's reed warbler (Buschrohrsänger) Acrocephalus dumetorum – A
- Eurasian reed warbler (Teichrohrsänger) Acrocephalus scirpaceus – A
- Marsh warbler (Sumpfrohrsänger) Acrocephalus palustris – A
- Booted warbler (Buschspötter) Iduna caligata – A
- Sykes's warbler (Steppenspötter) Iduna rama – A
- Eastern olivaceous warbler (Blassspötter) Iduna pallida – A
- Melodious warbler (Orpheusspötter) Hippolais polyglotta – A
- Icterine warbler (Gelbspötter) Hippolais icterina – A

== Grassbirds and allies ==
Order: Passeriformes Family: Locustellidae

Locustellidae are a family of small insectivorous songbirds found mainly in Eurasia, Africa, and the Australian region. They are smallish birds with tails that are usually long and pointed, and tend to be drab brownish or buffy all over.

- Pallas's grasshopper warbler (Streifenschwirl) Helopsaltes certhiola – B
- Lanceolated warbler (Strichelschwirl) Locustella lanceolata – A
- Common grasshopper warbler (Feldschwirl) Locustella naevia – A
- River warbler (Schlagschwirl) Locustella fluviatilis – A
- Savi's warbler (Rohrschwirl) Locustella luscinioides – A

== Cisticolas and allies ==
Order: Passeriformes Family: Cisticolidae

The Cisticolidae are warblers found mainly in warmer southern regions of the Old World. They are generally very small birds of drab brown or grey appearance found in open country such as grassland or scrub.

- Zitting cisticola (Cistensänger) Cisticola juncidis – A

== Sylviid warblers and allies ==
Order: Passeriformes Family: Sylviidae

The family Sylviidae is a group of small insectivorous birds. They mainly occur in Europe, Asia and, to a lesser extent, Africa; the highest diversity is in the Mediterranean region. Most are generally grey-brown, but often with black or grey head patterns, and a white throat; some have a reddish breast and/or rufous wings. Many have distinctive songs.

- Eurasian blackcap (Mönchsgrasmücke) Sylvia atricapilla – A
- Garden warbler (Gartengrasmücke) Sylvia borin – A
- Barred warbler (Sperbergrasmücke) Curruca nisoria – A
- Lesser whitethroat (Klappergrasmücke) Curruca curruca – A
- Western Orphean warbler (Orpheusgrasmücke) Curruca hortensis – A
- Asian desert warbler (Wüstengrasmücke) Curruca nana – A
- Greater whitethroat (Dorngrasmücke) Curruca communis – A
- Dartford warbler (Provencegrasmücke) Curruca undata – A
- Spectacled warbler (Brillengrasmücke) Curruca conspicillata – A
- Eastern subalpine warbler (Weißbart-Grasmücke) Curruca cantillans – A
- Moltoni's warbler (Ligurien-Bartgrasmücke) Curruca subalpina – A
- Sardinian warbler (Samtkopf-Grasmücke) Curruca melanocephala – A

== Crests ==
Order: Passeriformes Family: Regulidae

The crests or kinglets are a small family of birds which resemble some warblers. They are very small insectivorous birds in the single genus Regulus. The adults have coloured crowns, giving rise to their name.

- Common firecrest (Sommergoldhähnchen) Regulus ignicapillus – A
- Goldcrest (Wintergoldhähnchen) Regulus regulus – A

== Wrens ==
Order: Passeriformes Family: Troglodytidae

The wrens are mainly small and inconspicuous except for their loud songs. These birds have short wings and thin down-turned bills. Several species often hold their tails upright. All are insectivorous. The family is almost entirely found in the New World, with just one species widespread in the Old World.

- Eurasian wren (Zaunkönig) Troglodytes troglodytes – A

== Nuthatches ==
Order: Passeriformes Family: Sittidae

Nuthatches are small woodland birds. They have the unusual ability to climb down trees head first, unlike other birds which can only go upwards. Nuthatches have big heads, short tails, and powerful bills and feet.

- Eurasian nuthatch (Kleiber) Sitta europaea – A

== Wallcreeper ==
Order: Passeriformes Family: Tichodromidae

The wallcreeper is a small bird related to the nuthatch family which has stunning crimson, grey, and black plumage.

- Wallcreeper (Mauerläufer) Tichodroma muraria – A

== Treecreepers ==
Order: Passeriformes Family: Certhiidae

Treecreepers are small woodland birds, brown above and white below. They have thin pointed down-curved bills, which they use to extricate insects from bark. They have stiff tail feathers, like woodpeckers, which they use to support themselves on vertical trees.

- Eurasian treecreeper (Waldbaumläufer) Certhia familiaris – A
- Short-toed treecreeper (Gartenbaumläufer) Certhia brachydactyla – A

== Mockingbirds and thrashers ==
Order: Passeriformes Family: Mimidae

The mimids are a family of passerine birds that includes thrashers, mockingbirds, and the New World catbirds. These birds are notable for their songs and calls, especially their ability to mimic a wide variety of birds and other sounds heard outdoors. Their colouring tends towards greys and browns.

- Grey catbird (Katzenvogel) Dumetella carolinensis – B

== Starlings ==
Order: Passeriformes Family: Sturnidae

Starlings are small to medium-sized passerine birds. Their flight is strong and direct and they are very gregarious. Their preferred habitat is fairly open country. They eat insects and fruit. Their plumage is variable; many are dark with a strong to very strong metallic sheen, others are brightly patterned in pink, yellow, or other colours.

- Rosy starling (Rosenstar) Pastor roseus – A
- European starling (Star) Sturnus vulgaris – A

== Thrushes and allies ==
Order: Passeriformes Family: Turdidae

The thrushes are a group of passerine birds that occur mainly in the Old World. They are plump, soft plumaged, medium-sized insectivores or sometimes omnivores, often feeding on the ground. Many have attractive songs.

- Siberian thrush (Schieferdrossel) Geokichla sibirica – A
- White's thrush (Erddrossel) Zoothera aurea – A
- Grey-cheeked thrush (Grauwangendrossel) Catharus minimus – B
- Swainson's thrush (Zwergdrossel) Catharus ustulatus – A
- Hermit thrush (Einsiedlerdrossel) Catharus guttatus – B
- Tickell's thrush (Einfarbdrossel) Turdus unicolor – B
- Ring ouzel (Ringdrossel) Turdus torquatus – A
- Eurasian blackbird (Amsel) Turdus merula – A
- Eyebrowed thrush (Weißbrauendrossel) Turdus obscurus – A
- Black-throated thrush (Schwarzkehldrossel) Turdus atrogularis – A
- Red-throated thrush (Rotkehldrossel) Turdus ruficollis – A
- Naumann's thrush (Rostschwanzdrossel) Turdus naumanni – A
- Dusky thrush (Rostflügeldrossel) Turdus eunomus – A
- Fieldfare (Wacholderdrossel) Turdus pilaris – A
- Redwing (Rotdrossel) Turdus iliacus – A
- Song thrush (Singdrossel) Turdus philomelos – A
- Mistle thrush (Misteldrossel) Turdus viscivorus – A
- American robin (Wanderdrossel) Turdus migratorius – A

== Chats and Old World flycatchers ==
Order: Passeriformes Family: Muscicapidae

The chats and Old World flycatchers are a large group of small passerine birds native to the Old World. They are mainly small insectivores, arboreal or from open habitats. The appearance of these birds is highly varied, but they mostly have musical songs and harsh calls.

- Rufous-tailed scrub-robin (Heckensänger) Cercotrichas galactotes – A
- Spotted flycatcher (Grauschnäpper) Muscicapa striata – A
- European robin (Rotkehlchen) Erithacus rubecula – A
- Bluethroat (Blaukehlchen) Luscinia svecica – A
- Thrush nightingale (Sprosser) Luscinia luscinia – A
- Common nightingale (Nachtigall) Luscinia megarhynchos – A
- Siberian rubythroat (Rubinkehlchen) Calliope calliope – A
- Red-flanked bluetail (Blauschwanz) Tarsiger cyanurus – A
- European pied flycatcher (Trauerschnäpper) Ficedula hypoleuca – A
- Collared flycatcher (Halsbandschnäpper) Ficedula albicollis – A
- Red-breasted flycatcher (Zwergschnäpper) Ficedula parva – A
- Black redstart (Hausrotschwanz) Phoenicurus ochruros – A
- Common redstart (Gartenrotschwanz) Phoenicurus phoenicurus – A
- Rufous-tailed rock thrush (Steinrötel) Monticola saxatilis – A
- Blue rock thrush (Blaumerle) Monticola solitarius – A
- Whinchat (Braunkehlchen) Saxicola rubetra – A
- European stonechat (Schwarzkehlchen) Saxicola rubicola – A
- Siberian stonechat (Pallasschwarzkehlchen) Saxicola maurus – A
- Northern wheatear (Steinschmätzer) Oenanthe oenanthe – A
- Isabelline wheatear (Isabellsteinschmätzer) Oenanthe isabellina – A
- Desert wheatear (Wüstensteinschmätzer) Oenanthe deserti – A
- Western black-eared wheatear (Maurensteinschmätzer) Oenanthe hispanica – A
- Cyprus wheatear (Zypernsteinschmätzer) Oenanthe cypriaca – B
- Pied wheatear (Nonnensteinschmätzer) Oenanthe pleschanka – A

== Dippers ==
Order: Passeriformes Family: Cinclidae

Dippers are a group of perching birds whose habitat includes aquatic environments in the Americas, Europe, and Asia. They are named for their bobbing or dipping movements.

- White-throated dipper (Wasseramsel) Cinclus cinclus – A

== Old World sparrows ==
Order: Passeriformes Family: Passeridae

Sparrows are small passerine birds. In general, sparrows tend to be small, plump, brown or grey birds with short tails and short powerful beaks. Sparrows are seed eaters, but they also consume small insects.

- House sparrow (Haussperling) Passer domesticus – A
- Eurasian tree sparrow (Feldsperling) Passer montanus – A
- Rock sparrow (Steinsperling) Petronia petronia – B
- White-winged snowfinch (Schneesperling) Montifringilla nivalis – A

== Accentors and dunnocks ==
Order: Passeriformes Family: Prunellidae

The accentors or dunnocks are the only bird family which is completely endemic to the Palearctic. They are small, fairly drab species superficially similar to sparrows but with a slender bill.

- Alpine accentor (Alpenbraunelle) Prunella collaris – A
- Siberian accentor (Bergbraunelle) Prunella montanella – A
- Black-throated accentor (Schwarzkehlbraunelle) Prunella atrogularis – A
- Dunnock (Heckenbraunelle) Prunella modularis – A

== Wagtails and pipits ==
Order: Passeriformes Family: Motacillidae

Motacillidae is a family of small passerine birds with medium to long tails. They include the wagtails and pipits. They are slender ground-feeding insectivores of open country.

- Western yellow wagtail (Schafstelze) Motacilla flava – A
- Citrine wagtail (Zitronenstelze) Motacilla citreola – A
- Grey wagtail (Gebirgsstelze) Motacilla cinerea – A
- White wagtail (Bachstelze) Motacilla alba – A
- Richard's pipit (Spornpieper) Anthus richardi – A
- Blyth's pipit (Steppenpieper) Anthus godlewskii – A
- Tawny pipit (Brachpieper) Anthus campestris – A
- Meadow pipit (Wiesenpieper) Anthus pratensis – A
- Tree pipit (Baumpieper) Anthus trivialis – A
- Olive-backed pipit (Waldpieper) Anthus hodgsoni – A
- Pechora pipit (Petschorapieper) Anthus gustavi – A
- Red-throated pipit (Rotkehlpieper) Anthus cervinus – A
- Buff-bellied pipit (Pazifikpieper) Anthus rubescens – A
- Water pipit (Bergpieper) Anthus spinoletta – A
- Rock pipit (Strandpieper) Anthus petrosus – A

== Finches and allies ==
Order: Passeriformes Family: Fringillidae

Finches are seed-eating passerine birds that are small to moderately large and have a strong beak, usually conical and in some species very large. All have twelve tail feathers and nine primaries. These birds have a bouncing flight with alternating bouts of flapping and gliding on closed wings, and most sing well.

- Common chaffinch (Buchfink) Fringilla coelebs – A
- Brambling (Bergfink) Fringilla montifringilla – A
- Hawfinch (Kernbeißer) Coccothraustes coccothraustes – A
- Pine grosbeak (Hakengimpel) Pinicola enucleator – A
- Eurasian bullfinch (Gimpel) Pyrrhula pyrrhula – A
- Trumpeter finch (Wüstengimpel) Bucanetes githagineus – A
- Common rosefinch (Karmingimpel) Carpodacus erythrinus – A
- European greenfinch (Grünfink) Chloris chloris – A
- Twite (Berghänfling) Linaria flavirostris – A
- Eurasian linnet (Bluthänfling) Linaria cannabina – A
- Common redpoll (Taigabirkenzeisig) Acanthis flammea – A
- Lesser redpoll (Alpenbirkenzeisig) Acanthis cabaret – A
- Arctic redpoll (Polarbirkenzeisig) Acanthis hornemanni – A
- Parrot crossbill (Kiefernkreuzschnabel) Loxia pytyopsittacus – A
- Red crossbill (Fichtenkreuzschnabel) Loxia curvirostra – A
- Two-barred crossbill (Bindenkreuzschnabel) Loxia leucoptera – A
- European goldfinch (Stieglitz) Carduelis carduelis – A
- Citril finch (Zitronengirlitz) Carduelis citrinella – A
- European serin (Girlitz) Serinus serinus – A
- Eurasian siskin (Erlenzeisig) Spinus spinus – A

== Longspurs and snow buntings ==
Order: Passeriformes Family: Calcariidae

The Calcariidae are a family of birds that had been traditionally grouped with the buntings, but differ in a number of respects and are usually found in open grassy areas.

- Lapland longspur (Spornammer) Calcarius lapponicus – A
- Snow bunting (Schneeammer) Plectrophenax nivalis – A

== Old World buntings ==
Order: Passeriformes Family: Emberizidae

Emberizidae is a family of passerine birds containing a single genus. Until 2017, the New World sparrows (Passerellidae) were also considered part of this family.

- Corn bunting (Grauammer) Emberiza calandra – A
- Yellowhammer (Goldammer) Emberiza citrinella – A
- Pine bunting (Fichtenammer) Emberiza leucocephalos – A
- Rock bunting (Zippammer) Emberiza cia – A
- Grey-necked bunting (Steinortolan) Emberiza buchanani – A
- Cinereous bunting (Türkenammer) Emberiza cineracea – B
- Ortolan bunting (Ortolan) Emberiza hortulana – A
- Cretzschmar's bunting (Grauortolan) Emberiza caesia – A
- Cirl bunting (Zaunammer) Emberiza cirlus – A
- Little bunting (Zwergammer) Emberiza pusilla – A
- Rustic bunting (Waldammer) Emberiza rustica – A
- Yellow-breasted bunting (Weidenammer) Emberiza aureola – A
- Black-headed bunting (Kappenammer) Emberiza melanocephala – A
- Red-headed bunting (Braunkopfammer) Emberiza bruniceps – B
- Black-faced bunting (Maskenammer) Emberiza spodocephala – A
- Reed bunting (Rohrammer) Emberiza schoeniclus – A

== New World warblers ==
Order: Passeriformes Family: Parulidae

The New World warblers are a group of small, often colourful, passerine birds restricted to the New World. Most are arboreal, but some are terrestrial. Most members of this family are insectivores.

- Northern parula (Meisenwaldsänger) Setophaga americana – A
- Black-throated green warbler (Grünwaldsänger) Setophaga virens – B

== Appendices ==
=== Category D ===
Species that would otherwise appear in categories A or B except that there is reasonable doubt that they have ever occurred in a natural state.

- Baikal teal (Gluckente) Sibirionetta formosa
- Falcated duck (Sichelente) Mareca falcata
- Red-wattled lapwing (Rotlappenkiebitzes) Vanellus indicus – D
- Snowy egret (Schmuckreiher) Egretta thula
- Song sparrow (Singammer) Melospiza melodia

=== Category E ===
Species that have been recorded as introductions, transportees, or escapees from captivity, and whose breeding populations (if any) are not believed to be self-sustaining. Only selected species are shown here (for a full list, see Barthel & Krüger 2019).

- Greater rhea (Nandu) Rhea americana (see note) (Note: A population of greater rheas in a small area has grown to at least 150 birds from several which escaped from a farm in 2000. However, the Deutsche Ornithologen-Gesellschaft (German Ornithologists' Society) does not consider them established because three generations have not passed.)
- Red-legged partridge (Rothuhn) Alectoris rufa
- Cackling goose (Zwergkanadagans) Branta hutchinsii
- Snow goose (Schneegans) Anser caerulescens
- Swan goose (Schwanengans) Anser cygnoides
- Black swan (Schwarzschwan) Cygnus atratus
- Wood duck (Brautente) Aix sponsa
- African sacred ibis (Pharaonenibis) Threskiornis aethiopicus
- Northern bald ibis (Waldrapp) Geronticus eremita
- Western reef heron (Küstenreiher) Egretta gularis
- Lanner falcon (Lannerfalke) Falco biarmicus
- Yellow-headed parrot (Gelbkopfamazone) Amazona oratrix
- Alexandrine parakeet (GroßerAlexandersittich) Psittacula eupatria
- Daurian jackdaw (Elsterdohle) Corvus dauuricus
- White-crowned wheatear (Saharasteinschmätzer) Oenanthe leucopyga
- White-throated sparrow (Weißkehlammer) Zonotrichia albicollis
- Savannah sparrow (Grasammer) Passerculus sandwichensis
- Brown-headed cowbird (Braunkopf-Kuhstärling) Molothrus ater
- Rose-breasted grosbeak (Rosenbrust-Kernknacker) Pheucticus ludovicianus

== See also ==
- List of birds
- Lists of birds by region
