= Dutch Birding =

- Editor: Arnoud van den Berg
- Categories: Ornithology
- Frequency: Bimonthly
- Publisher: Dutch Birding Association
- First issue: 1979
- Country: Netherlands
- Language: Dutch, English
- Website: www.dutchbirding.nl/journal
- ISSN: 0167-2878
- OCLC: 885234088

Dutch Birding, originally subtitled Journal of the Dutch Birding Association, and currently subtitled International journal on Palaearctic birds, is an ornithological magazine published by the Amsterdam-based Dutch Birding Association. It was established in 1979 and its editor-in-chief is Arnoud van den Berg.

The magazine has English and Dutch language editions and covers morphology, systematics, occurrence, and distribution of birds in the Benelux, Europe, and elsewhere in the Palaearctic region. It also publishes contributions on birds in the Asian-Pacific region and other regions.

== See also ==
- Ardea – official publication of the Netherlands Ornithologists' Union
- List of birds of the Netherlands
- List of journals and magazines relating to birding and ornithology
