= Ardea (journal) =

- Discipline: Ornithology
- Language: English
- Edited by: Rob G. Bijlsma, Bart Kempenaers, Theunis Piersma

Publication details
- History: 1912–present
- Publisher: Netherlands Ornithologists' Union (Netherlands)
- Frequency: Biannually
- Open access: Hybrid
- License: CC BY
- Impact factor: 1.088 (2019)

Standard abbreviations
- ISO 4: Ardea

Indexing
- ISSN: 0373-2266
- LCCN: 51015157
- OCLC no.: 611618777

Links
- Journal homepage; Online access; Online archive

Ardea is a biannual peer-reviewed scientific journal that was established in 1912. It is the official publication of the Netherlands Ornithologists' Union and covers the ecology, life history, and evolution of birds. It occasionally publishes special issues on conference or workshop proceedings. The journal takes its name from the heron genus Ardea.

== See also ==
- Dutch Birding – journal of the Dutch Birding Association
- List of birds of the Netherlands
- List of journals and magazines relating to birding and ornithology
