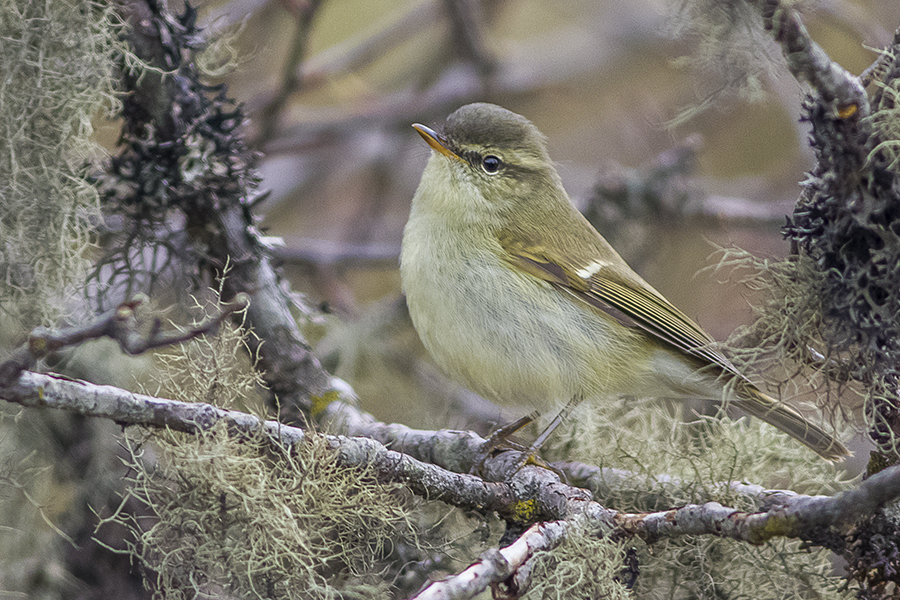
- nominate race P. trochiloides trochiloides adult from Pangolakha Wildlife Sanctuary, Sikkim, India

Conservation status
- Least Concern (IUCN 3.1)

Scientific classification
- Kingdom: Animalia
- Phylum: Chordata
- Class: Aves
- Order: Passeriformes
- Family: Phylloscopidae
- Genus: Phylloscopus
- Species: P. trochiloides

Binomial name
- Phylloscopus trochiloides (Sundevall, 1837)

Subspecies
- 5, and see text
- Range of P. trochiloides Breeding Passage Non-breeding

= Greenish warbler =

Species of bird

The greenish warbler (Phylloscopus trochiloides) is a widespread leaf warbler with a breeding range in northeastern Europe, and temperate to subtropical continental Asia. This warbler is strongly migratory and winters in India. It is not uncommon as a spring or early autumn vagrant in Western Europe and is annually seen in Great Britain. In Central Europe large numbers of vagrant birds are encountered in some years; some of these may stay to breed, as a handful of pairs does each year in Germany.

Like all leaf warblers, it was formerly placed in the "Old World warbler" assemblage, but now belongs to the new leaf-warbler family Phylloscopidae. The genus name Phylloscopus is from Ancient Greek phullon, "leaf", and skopos, "seeker" (from skopeo, "to watch"). The specific trochiloides is from Ancient Greek trokhalos, "bowed", and -oides "resembling", from the similarity to the willow warbler, P. trochilus. The English name of this species provides a perfect argument in favour of the capitalisation of species names (i.e. treating them as proper nouns), a convention which is generally applied in scientific literature. The decapitalised "greenish warbler" is equally descriptive of many bird species across multiple families, whereas a capitalised "Greenish Warbler" shows unambiguously that Phylloscopus trochiloides is under discussion.

== Description and ecology ==
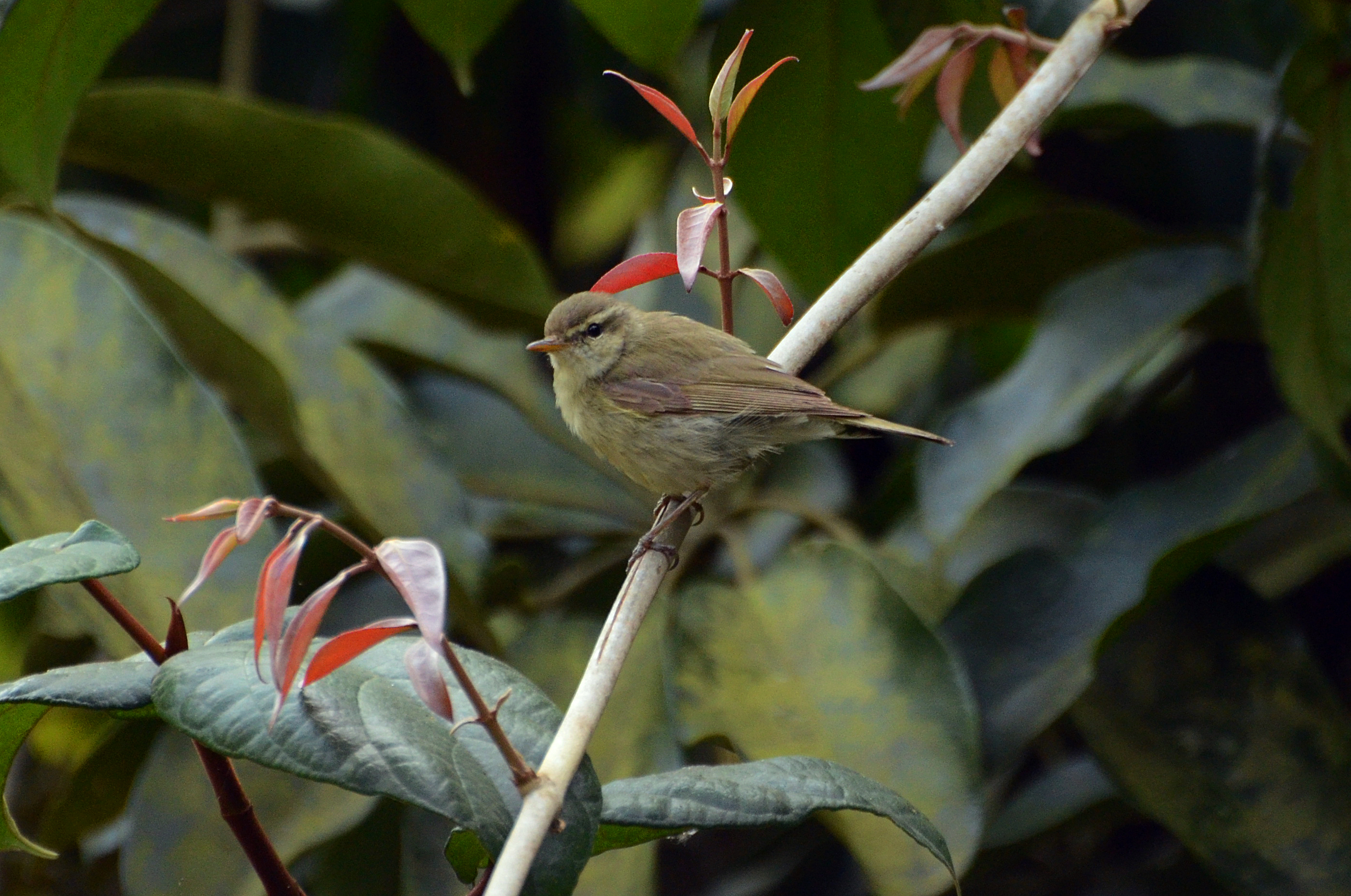
Greenish warbler P. trochiloides from Anamalai Hills, Southern Western Ghats, India

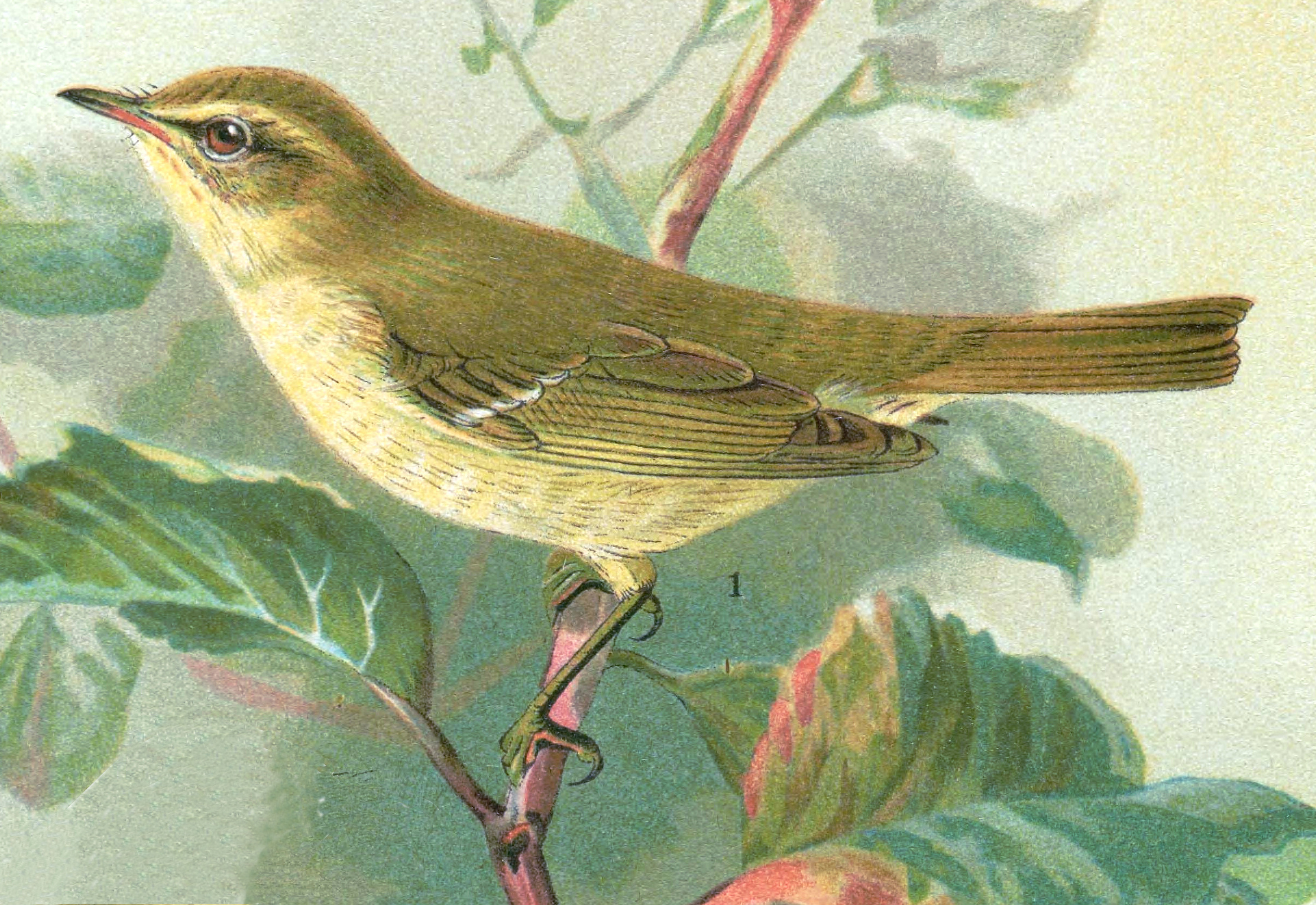
Western greenish warbler, P. (t.) viridanus

This is a typical leaf warbler in appearance, grayish-green above and off-white below. The single wing bar found in the southern and western populations distinguishes them from most similar species (except Arctic warbler P. borealis). It is slightly smaller than that species and has a thinner bill, without a dark tip to the lower mandible. A latitude-based analysis of wintering birds indicated that more northerly P. trochiloides are smaller, i.e. this species does not seem to follow Bergmann's rule.

Its song is a high jerky trill, in some populations containing a sequence of down- and more rarely up slurred notes.

It breeds in lowland deciduous or mixed forest; non-breeding birds in the warmer parts of its range may move to montane habitat in summer. Individuals from southeast of the Himalayas are for example quite often seen in Bhutan during the hot months, typically in humid Bhutan Fir (Abies densa) forest up to about 3,800 meters ASL or more, but they do not breed there and return again to the adjacent subtropical lowlands in winter.

The nest is on the ground in low shrub. Like its relatives, this small passerine is insectivorous.

=== Subspecies and evolution ===
Presumed evolution around Himalayas. Yellow: P. t. trochiloides Orange: P. t. obscuratus Red: P. plumbeitarsus green: P. t. ludlowi Blue: P. t. viridanus P. nitidus of the Caucasus is not shown.

It has a number of subspecies, of which P. t . viridanus is the most familiar in Europe. As it seems, it is a ring species, with populations diverging east- and westwards of the Tibetan Plateau, later meeting on the northern side. Their relationships are therefore fairly confusing:

- Eastern group: greenish warblers
  - Phylloscopus trochiloides trochiloides: greenish warbler
    - Southern rim of the Himalaya eastwards from Nepal into W China.
    - Dusky greyish green above, often traces of second wing bar.
  - Phylloscopus trochiloides obscuratus: dull-green warbler
    - Intermediate between trochiloides and two-barred warbler.
    - Gansu and surroundings, China.
  - Phylloscopus trochiloides ludlowi
- Western group: green warblers
  - Phylloscopus trochiloides viridanus: western greenish warbler
    - Breeds Western Siberia to north-east Europe; at east of range south to NW India.
    - Dull green above, with yellowish supercilium, throat, breast and faint wing bar.

The groups' origin lies probably in the Himalayan region, where trochiloides is found. This taxon is close to the parapatric obscuratus, and to plumbeitarsus which is geographically separated from obscuratus; they all can (and in the case of the former two do naturally) hybridize. P. t. plumbeitarsus is often split as distinct species, as it does not hybridize with viridanus in the narrow zone in the western Sayan Mountains where their ranges overlap.

But phylogenetically, the western taxa are even more distinct. However, there is some gene flow between trochiloides and viridanus also, with their hybrids being especially common in Baltistan; which are now considered as a distinct subspecies ludlowi. The green warbler P. nitidus, now considered as a distinct species, is a mountain isolate that diverged from ancestral viridanus.

Song structure differs mainly between greenish warbler and two-barred warbler, which was formerly considered conspecific. The former has a fairly uniform, long, and warbling song. Around the Himalayas, song structure is similar, but songs are generally shorter. Two-barred warbler, on the other hand, has a long song that can be clearly divided into a warbling part, followed by a series of up- and downslurred notes. The songs of obscuratus and ludlowi, are short, but contain the downslur elements too; in the latter, they uniquely appear at the start of the song.
