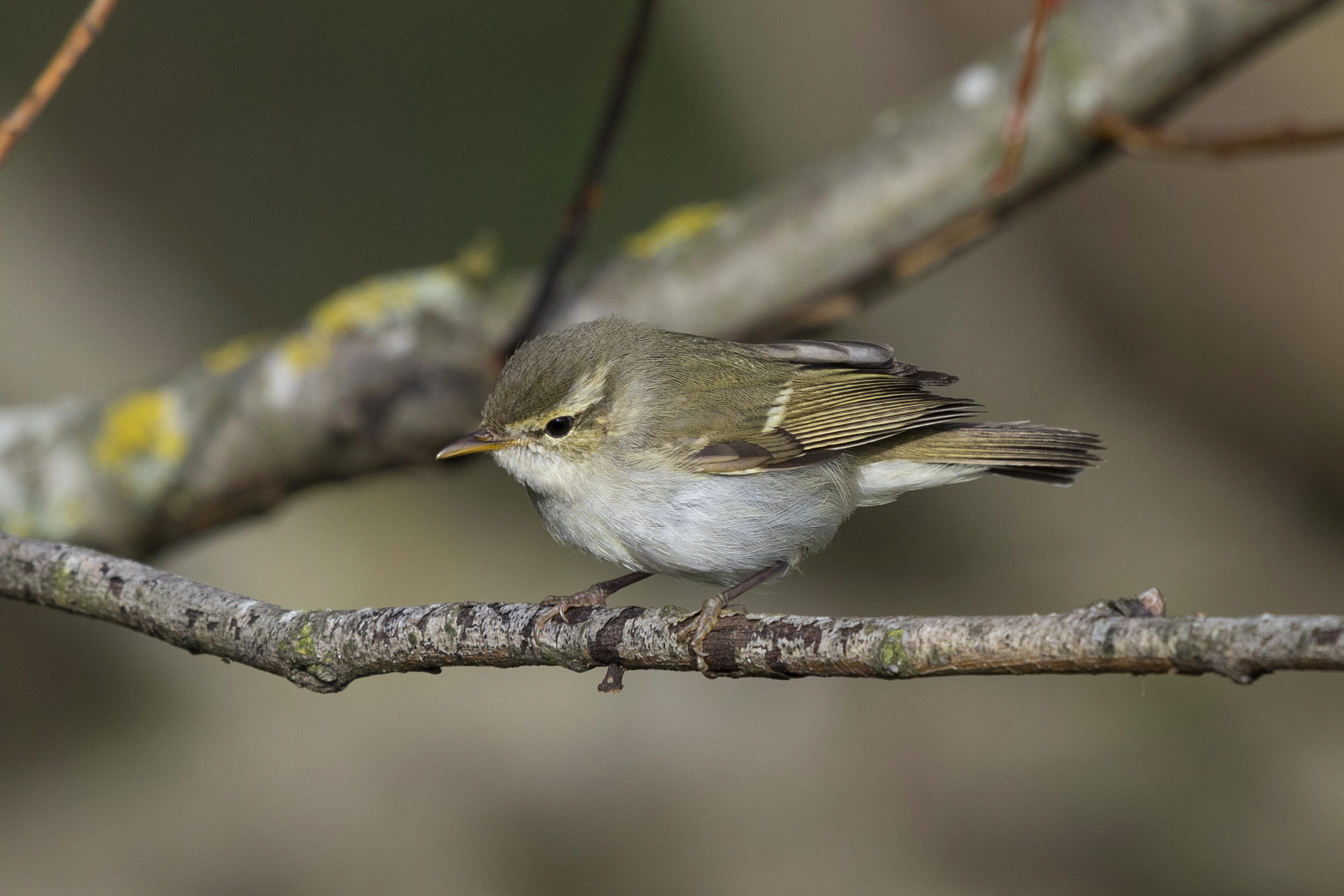
- Vagrant two-barred warbler in Öland, Sweden

Conservation status
- Least Concern (IUCN 3.1)

Scientific classification
- Kingdom: Animalia
- Phylum: Chordata
- Class: Aves
- Order: Passeriformes
- Family: Phylloscopidae
- Genus: Phylloscopus
- Species: P. plumbeitarsus

Binomial name
- Phylloscopus plumbeitarsus R. Swinhoe, 1861

Synonyms
- Phylloscopus trochiloides plumbeitarsus

= Two-barred warbler =

Species of bird

The two-barred warbler (Phylloscopus plumbeitarsus) is a bird of the leaf warbler family (Phylloscopidae). The species was first described by Robert Swinhoe in 1861. It was formerly included in the "Old World warbler" assemblage. It is closely related to the greenish warbler, to which it was formerly considered conspecific.

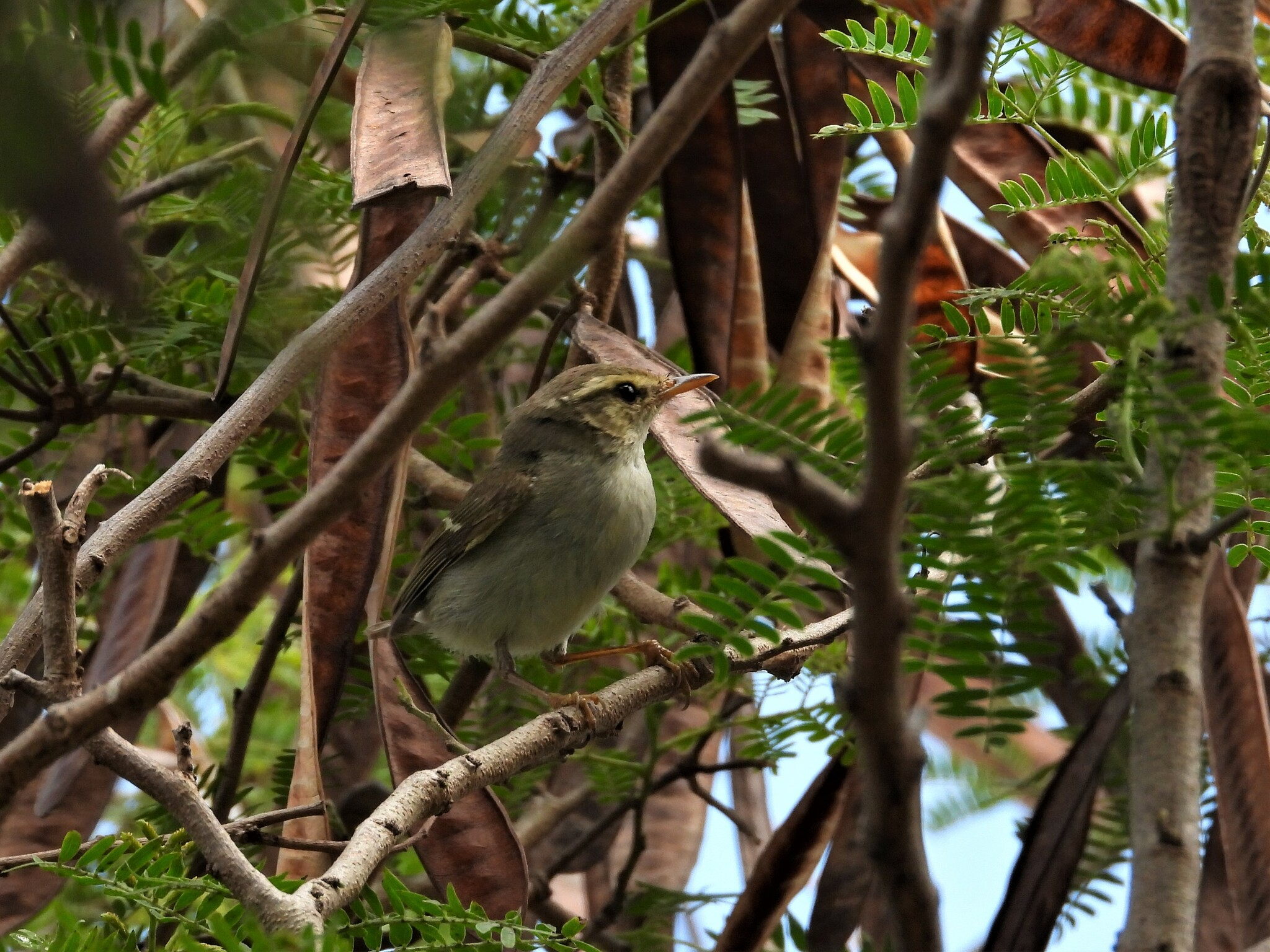
In Hong Kong

It is found in northern Mongolia, Manchuria and southern Siberia.

They are a migratory species. Before the autumn migration, both adults and juveniles molt.
