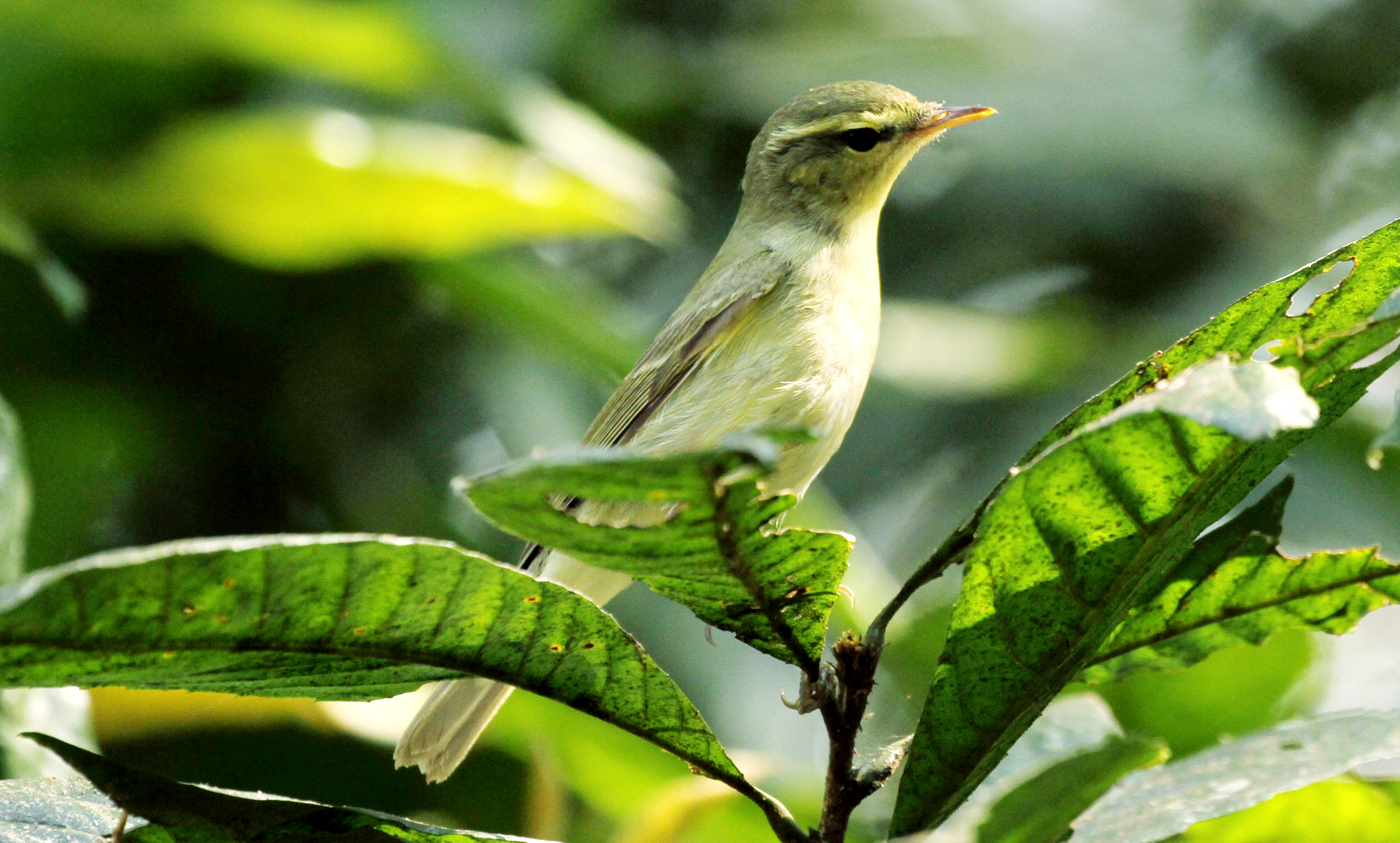

Conservation status
- Least Concern (IUCN 3.1)

Scientific classification
- Kingdom: Animalia
- Phylum: Chordata
- Class: Aves
- Order: Passeriformes
- Family: Phylloscopidae
- Genus: Phylloscopus
- Species: P. nitidus

Binomial name
- Phylloscopus nitidus Blyth, 1843

= Green warbler =

Species of bird

The green warbler (Phylloscopus nitidus), also known as green willow warbler or green leaf warbler, is a leaf warbler found in the Caucasus Mountains in southeastern Europe.

Like all leaf warblers, it was formerly placed in the "Old World warbler" assemblage, but now belongs to the new leaf-warbler family Phylloscopidae. The genus name Phylloscopus is from Ancient Greek phullon, "leaf", and skopos, "seeker" (from skopeo, "to watch"). The specific nitidus is from Latin and means "shining".

It is most closely related to the greenish warbler but is brighter in colour, and the underside is much more yellow. It has one strong and one faint wing bar, especially in young birds.
