= List of birds of Sweden =

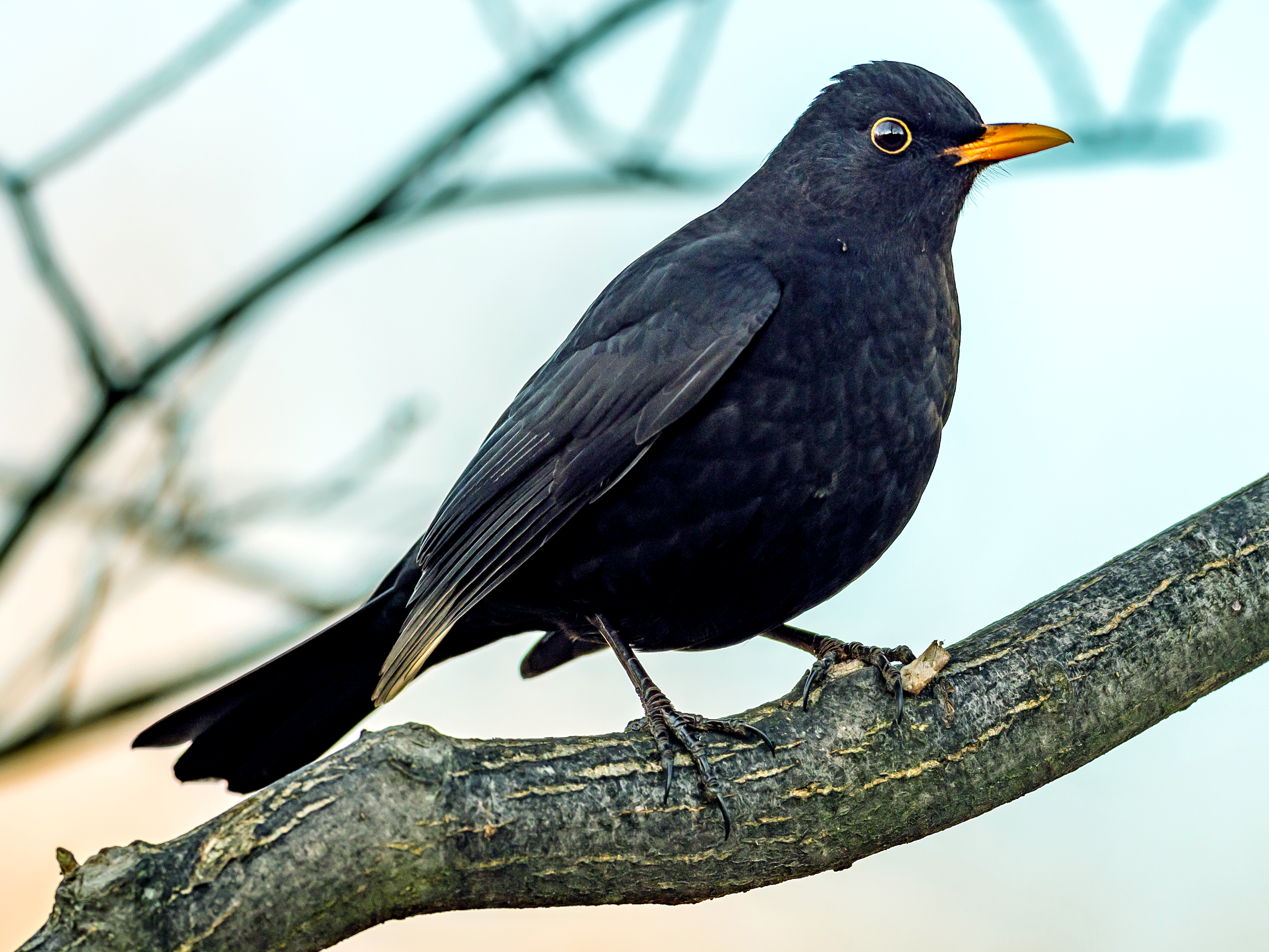
The Eurasian blackbird, here at Vaxholm near Stockholm, is the national bird of Sweden.

This is a list of the bird species recorded in Sweden. The avifauna of Sweden included a total of 562 confirmed species as of 2024, according to Birdlife Sverige (BLS). Of them, seven have been introduced by humans and one, the great auk, is globally extinct. This list does not include species whose origin (whether wild or human-assisted) is not known.

This list's taxonomic treatment (designation and sequence of orders, families and species) and nomenclature (Swedish, English and scientific names) are those of AviList, which the Swedish Taxonomic Committee follows as of June 2025.

The following tags have been used to highlight some categories of occurrence as noted by Birdlife Sverige.

- (B) Breeding – regularly breeds in Sweden
- (b) Irregularly breeding – irregularly breeds in Sweden
- (M) Migrating or wintering – does not breed in Sweden but passes through on migration or regular non-breeding visitor
- (O) Occasional – annual but irregular, with more than 100 records in total
- (R) Rarity - less than 100 records
- (I) Introduced - a species introduced directly or indirectly to Sweden and which has an established population or is derived from such a population outside Sweden

== Ducks, geese, and waterfowl ==
Order: Anseriformes Family: Anatidae

Anatidae includes geese, swans, and ducks. These birds are adapted to an aquatic existence with webbed feet, flattened bills, and feathers that are excellent at shedding water due to an oily coating.

- Ruddy duck (amerikansk kopparand) Oxyura jamaicensis (R) (I)
- Mute swan (knölsvan) Cygnus olor (B)
- Tundra swan (mindre sångsvan) Cygnus columbianus (M)
- Whooper swan (sångsvan) Cygnus cygnus (B)
- Brant goose (prutgås) Branta bernicla (M)
- Red-breasted goose (rödhalsad gås) Branta ruficollis (O)
- Canada goose (kanadagås) Branta canadensis (B) (I)
- Barnacle goose (vitkindad gås) Branta leucopsis (B)
- Cackling goose (polargås) Branta hutchinsii (R)
- Bar-headed goose (stripgås) Anser indicus (O) (I)
- Ross's goose (dvärgsnögås) Anser rossi (R)
- Greylag goose (grågås) Anser anser (B)
- Lesser white-fronted goose (fjällgås) Anser erythropus (B)
- Greater white-fronted goose (bläsgås) Anser albifrons (M)
- Tundra bean goose (tundragås) Anser serrirostris (b)
- Pink-footed goose (spetsbergsgås) Anser brachyrhynchus (M)
- Taiga bean goose (skogsgås) Anser fabalis (B)
- Mandarin duck (mandarinand) Aix galericulata (B) (I)
- Egyptian goose (nilgås) Alopochen aegyptiaca (O) (I)
- Common shelduck (gravand) Tadorna tadorna (B)
- Ruddy shelduck (rostand) Tadorna ferruginea (O)
- Long-tailed duck (alfågel) Clangula hyemalis (B)
- Steller's eider (alförrädare) Polysticta stelleri (O)
- King eider (praktejder) Somateria spectabilis (O)
- Common eider (ejder) Somateria mollissima (B)
- Harlequin duck (strömand) Histrionicus histrionicus (R)
- Common scoter (sjöorre) Melanitta nigra (B)
- Black scoter (amerikansk sjöorre) Melanitta americana (R)
- Surf scoter (vitnackad svärta) Melanitta perspicillata (O)
- Velvet scoter (svärta) Melanitta fusca (B)
- White-winged scoter (amerikansk knölsvärta) Melanitta deglandi (R)
- Stejneger's scoter (sibirisk knölsvärta) Melanitta stejnegeri (R)
- Common goldeneye (knipa) Bucephala clangula (B)
- Smew (salskrake) Mergellus albellus (B)
- Red-breasted merganser (småskrake) Mergus serrator (B)
- Common merganser (storskrake) Mergus merganser (B)
- Red-crested pochard (rödhuvad dykand) Netta rufina (O)
- Ferruginous duck (vitögd dykand) Aythya nyroca (R)
- Common pochard (brunand) Aythya ferina (B)
- Ring-necked duck (ringand) Aythya collaris (R)
- Tufted duck (vigg) Aythya fuligula (B)
- Lesser scaup (mindre bergand) Aythya affinis (R)
- Greater scaup (bergand) Aythya marila (B)
- Baikal teal (gulkindad kricka) Sibirionetta formosa (R)
- Garganey (årta) Spatula querquedula (B)
- Blue-winged teal (blåvingad årta) Spatula discors (R)
- Northern shoveler (skedand) Spatula clypeata (B)
- Gadwall (snatterand) Mareca strepera (B)
- Eurasian wigeon (bläsand) Mareca penelope (B)
- American wigeon (amerikansk bläsand) Mareca americana (O)
- Mallard (gräsand) Anas platyrhynchos (B)
- American black duck (svartand) Anas rubripes (R)
- Northern pintail (stjärtand) Anas acuta (B)
- Green-winged teal (kricka) Anas crecca (B)
  - Eurasian green-winged teal (eurasisk kricka) Anas crecca crecca (B)
  - American green-winged teal (amerikansk kricka) Anas crecca carolinensis (O)
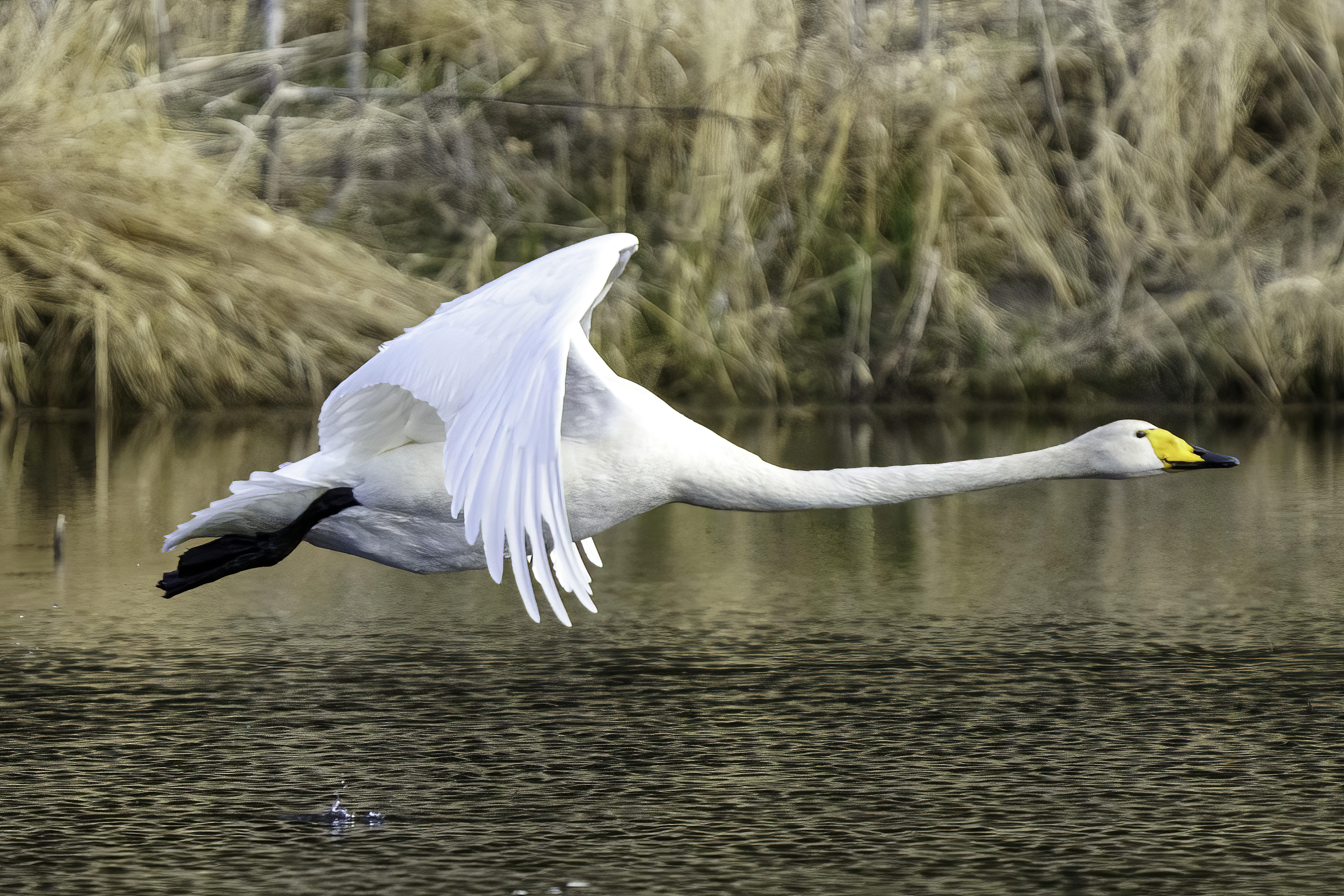
Whooper swan, Vaxholm, Stockholm

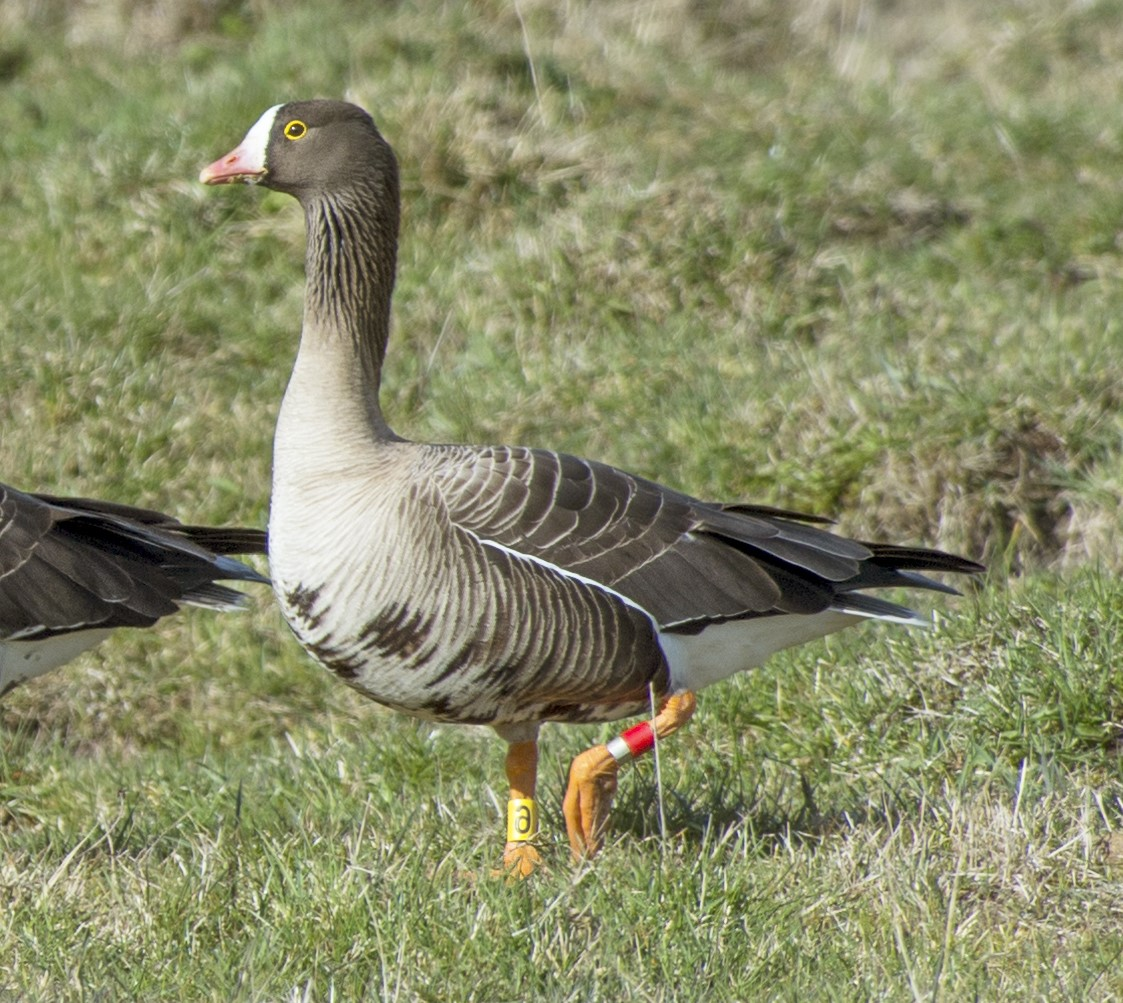
Lesser white-fronted goose, Sätunaviken, Östergötland

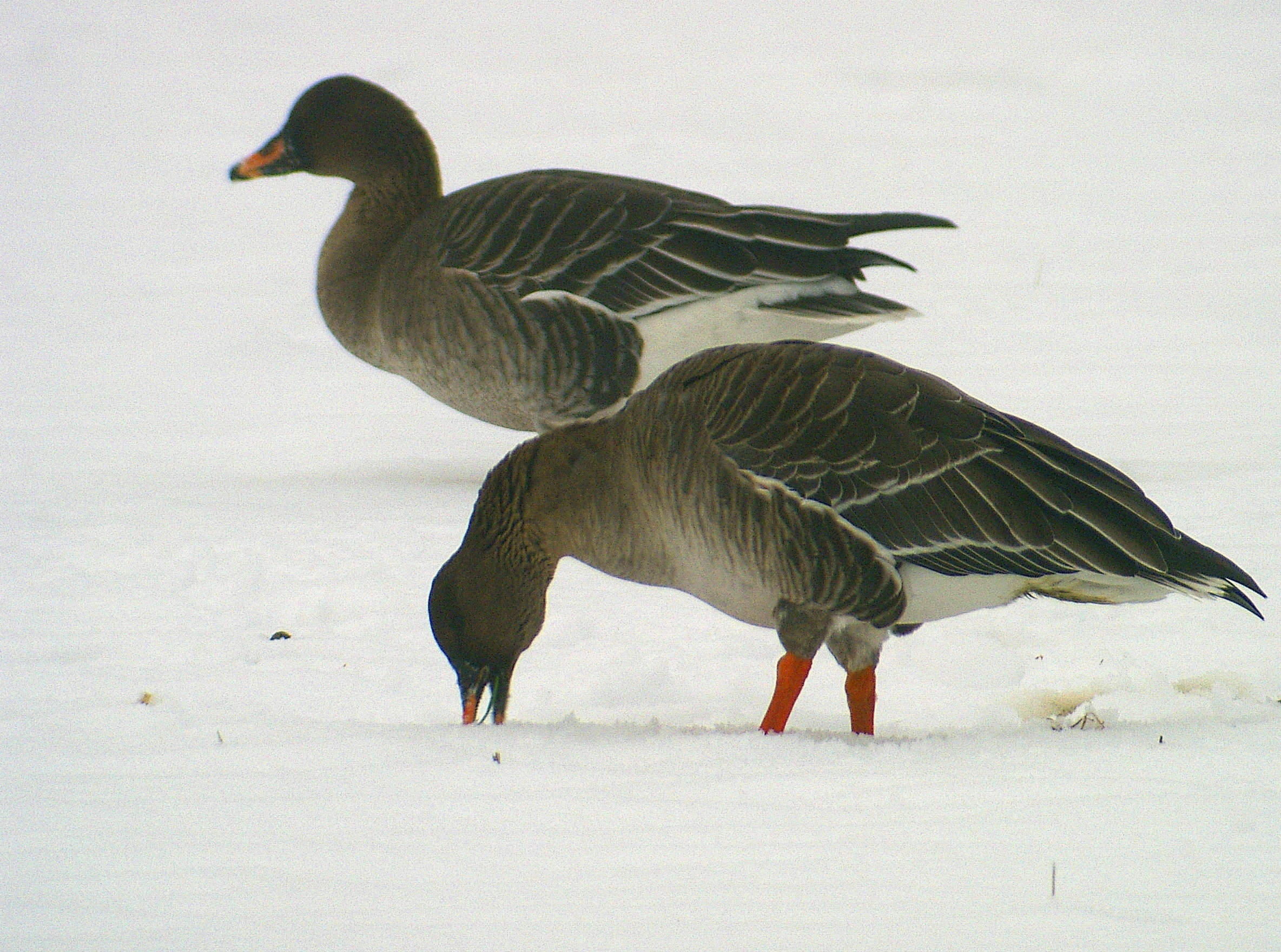
Tundra bean geese, Billdal, Västra Götaland

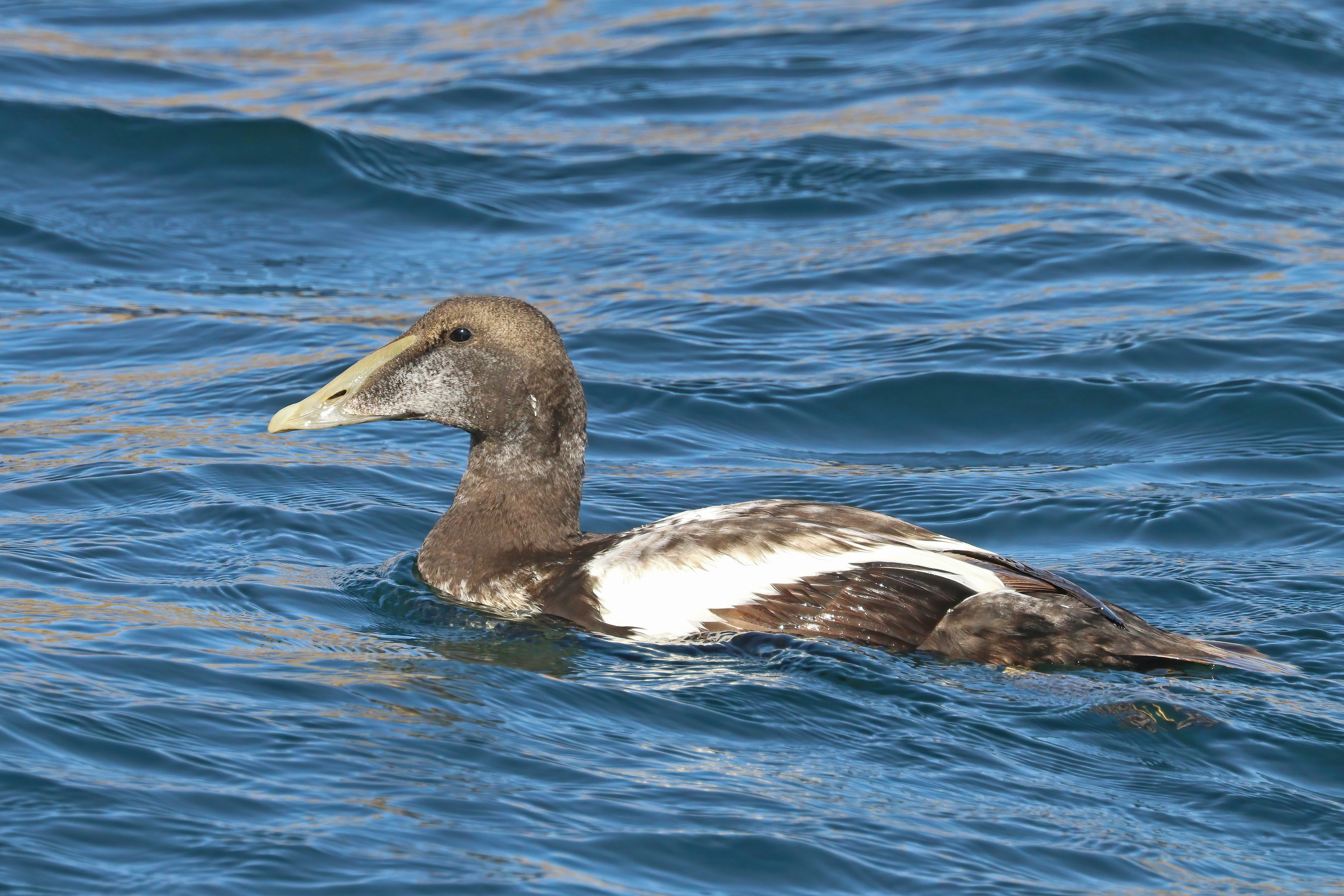
Common eider, Smögen, Västra Götaland

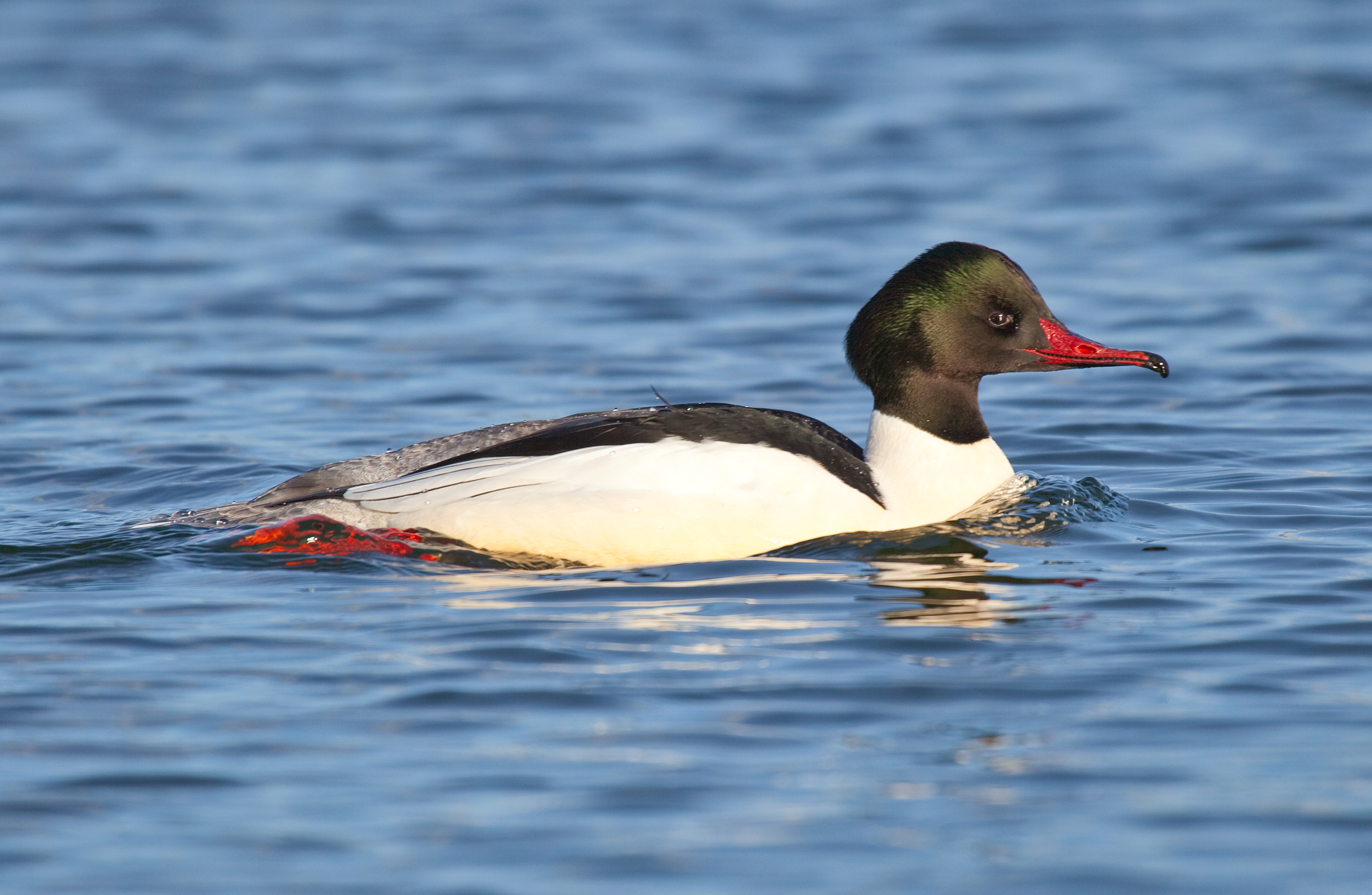
Common merganser, Vaxholm, Stockholm

== Pheasants, grouse, and allies ==
Order: Galliformes Family: Phasianidae

These are terrestrial species of gamebirds, feeding and nesting on the ground. They are variable in size but generally plump, with broad and relatively short wings.

- Hazel grouse (järpe) Tetrastes bonasia (B)
- Rock ptarmigan (fjällripa) Lagopus muta (B)
- Willow ptarmigan (dalripa) Lagopus lagopus (B)
- Western capercaillie (tjäder) Tetrao urogallus (B)
- Black grouse (orre) Lyrurus tetrix (B)
- Grey partridge (rapphöna) Perdix perdix (B)
- Common pheasant (fasan) Phasianus colchicus (B) (I)
- Common quail (vaktel) Coturnix coturnix (B)
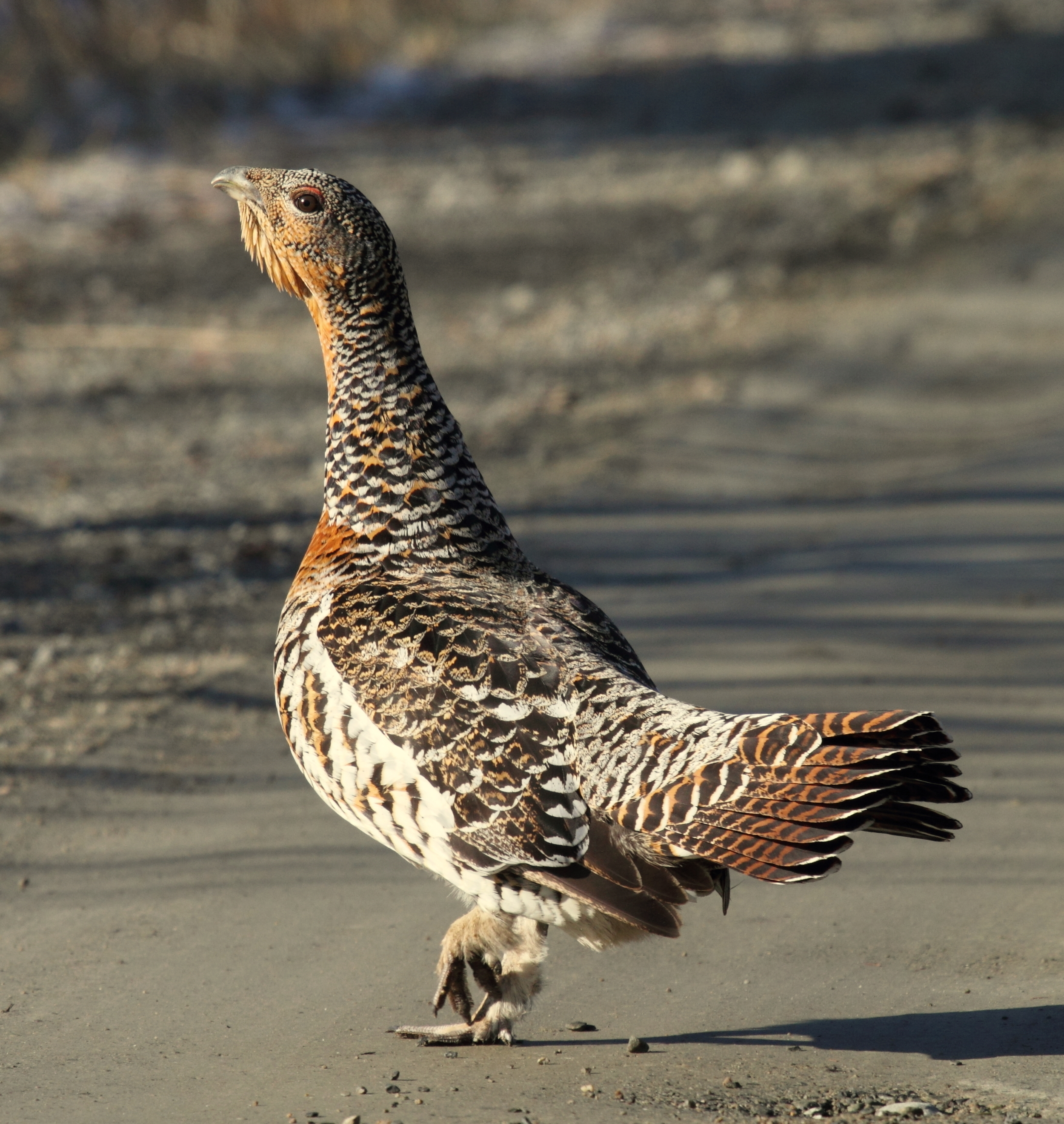
Western capercaillie, Ytterolden, Jämtland

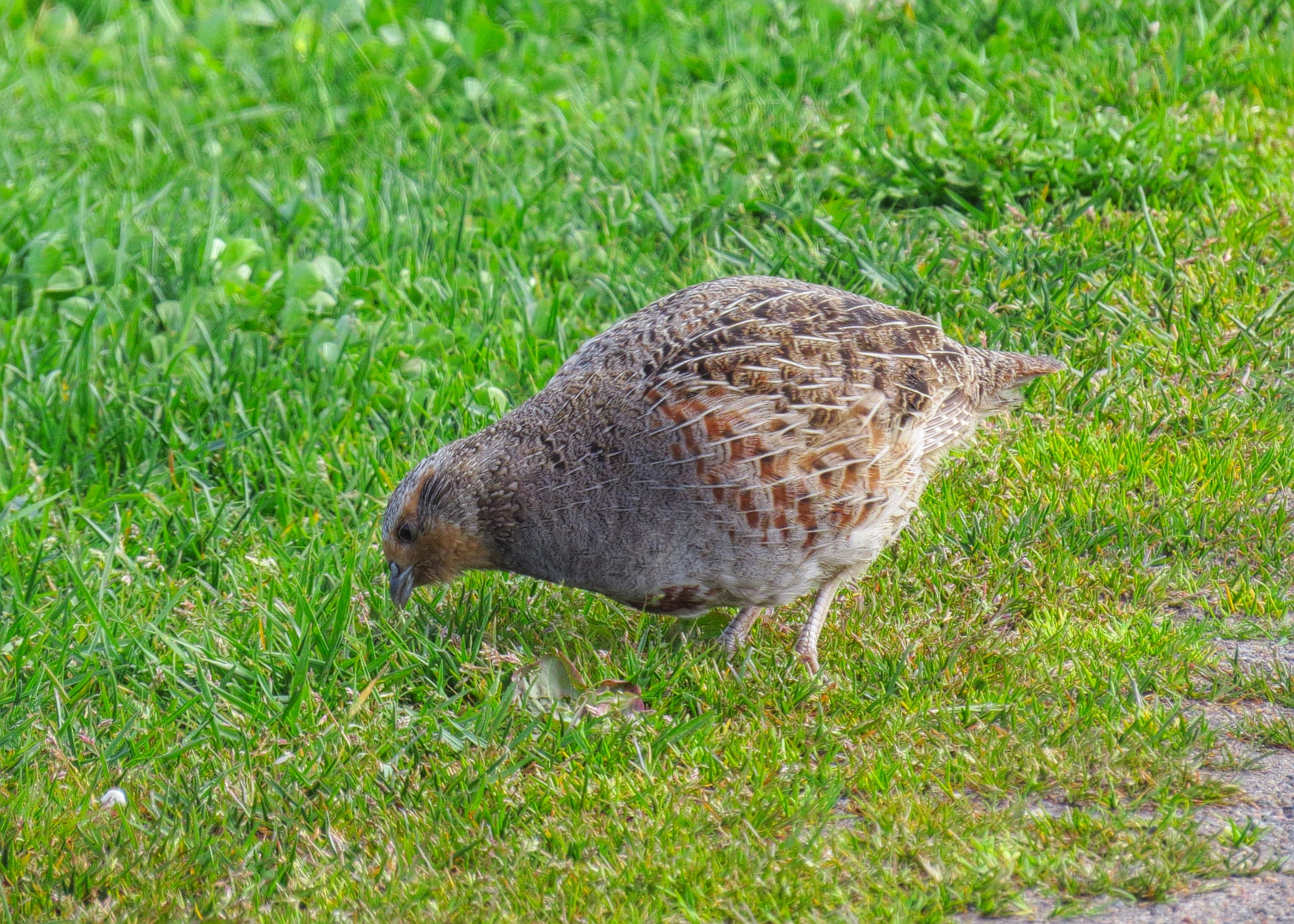
Grey partridge, Morups Tånge, Falkenberg, Halland

== Grebes ==
Order: Podicipediformes Family: Podicipedidae

Grebes are small to medium-large freshwater diving birds. They have lobed toes and are excellent swimmers and divers. However, they have their feet placed far back on the body, making them quite ungainly on land.

- Little grebe (smådopping) Tachybaptus ruficollis (B)
- Horned grebe (svarthakedopping) Podiceps auritus (B)
- Red-necked grebe (gråhakedopping) Podiceps grisegena (B)
- Great crested grebe (skäggdopping) Podiceps cristatus (B)
- Black-necked grebe (svarthalsad dopping) Podiceps nigricollis (B)
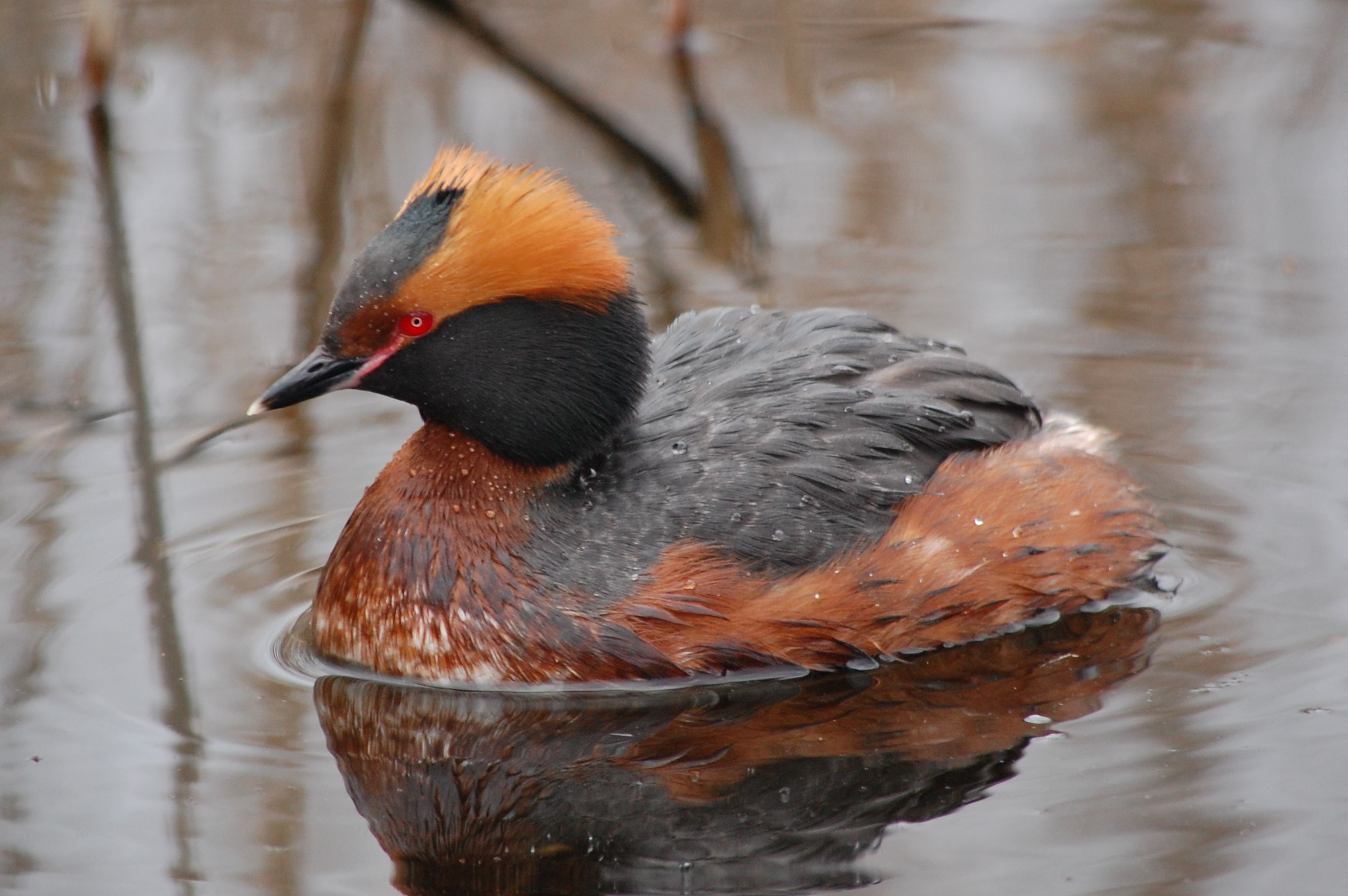
Horned grebe, Kyrksjölötens naturreservat, Stockholm

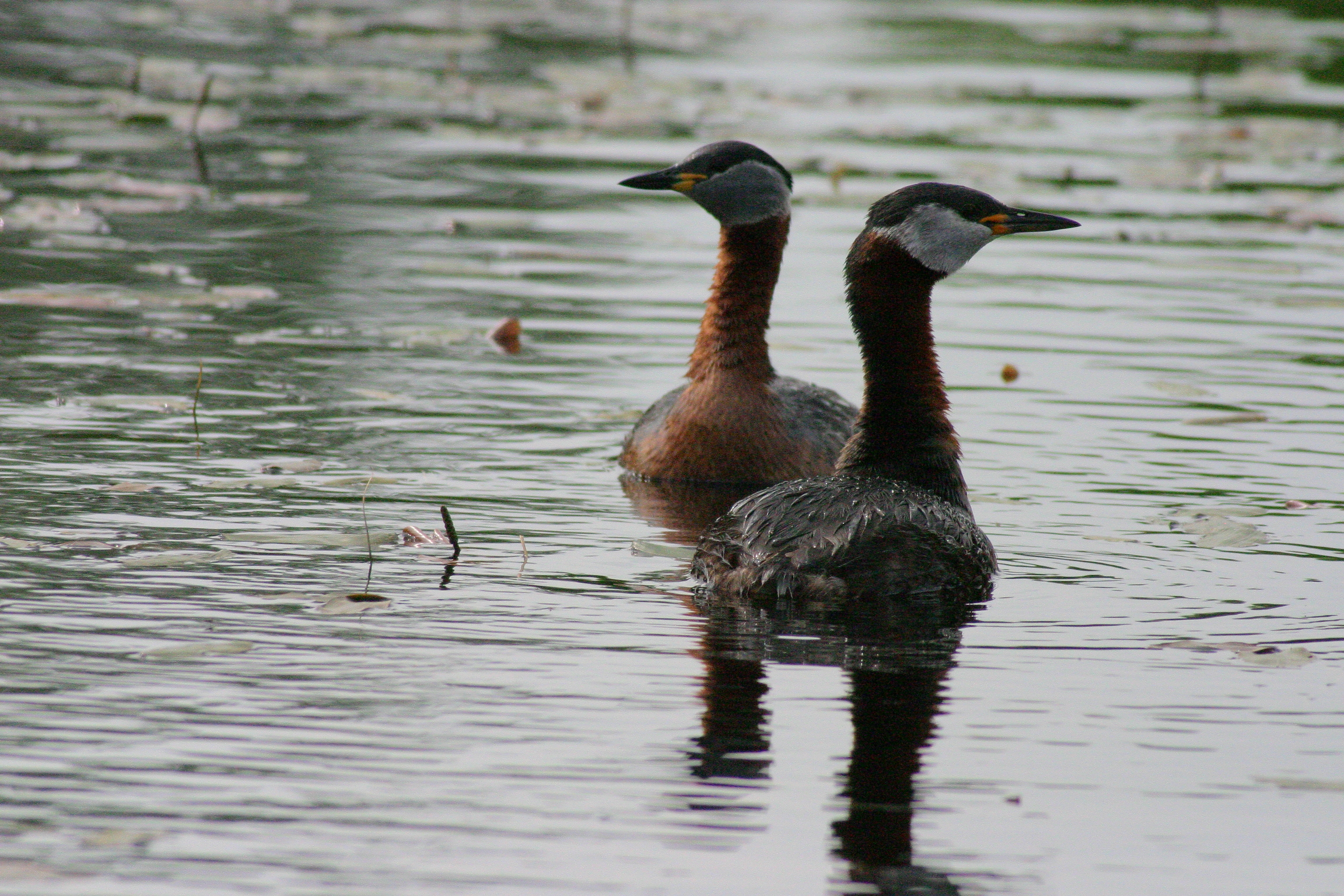
Red-necked grebes, Sweden

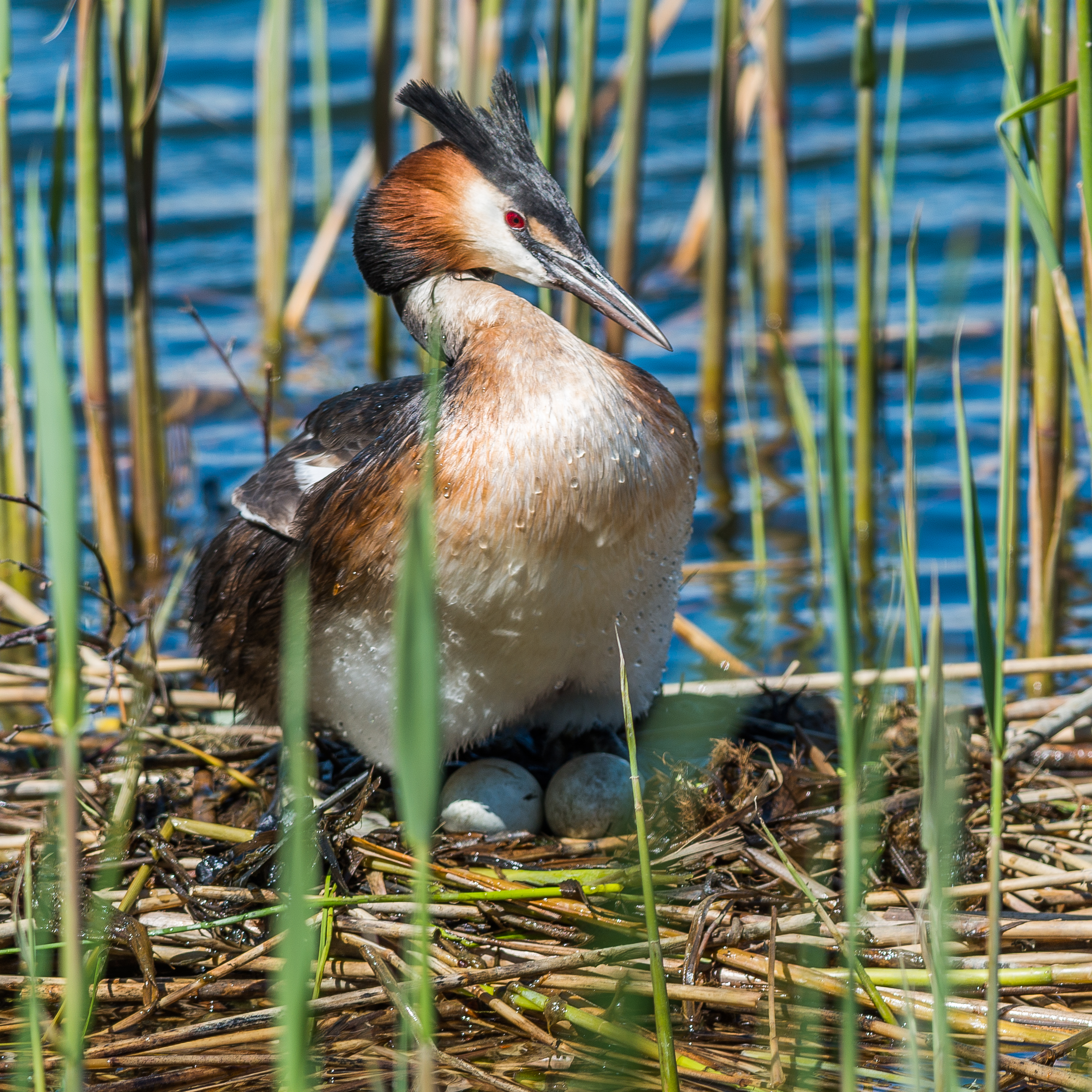
Great crested grebe, Vaxholm, Stockholm

== Bustards ==
Order: Otidiformes Family: Otididae

Bustards are large terrestrial birds mainly associated with dry open country and steppes in the Old World. They are omnivorous and nest on the ground. They walk steadily on strong legs and big toes, pecking for food as they go. They have long broad wings with "fingered" wingtips and striking patterns in flight. Many have interesting mating displays.

- Great bustard (stortrapp) Otis tarda (R)
- Asian houbara (kragtrapp) Chlamydotis macqueenii (R)
- Little bustard (småtrapp) Tetrax tetrax (R)

== Cuckoos ==
Order: Cuculiformes Family: Cuculidae

The family Cuculidae includes cuckoos, roadrunners, and anis. These birds are of variable size with slender bodies, long tails, and strong legs. The Old World cuckoos are brood parasites.

- Great spotted cuckoo (skatgök) Clamator glandarius (R)
- Common cuckoo (gök) Cuculus canorus (B)

== Sandgrouse ==
Order: Pterocliformes Family: Pteroclidae

Sandgrouse have small pigeon-like heads and necks, but sturdy compact bodies. They have long pointed wings and sometimes tails and a fast direct flight. Flocks fly to watering holes at dawn and dusk. Their legs are feathered down to the toes.

- Pallas's sandgrouse (stäppflyghöna) Syrrhaptes paradoxus (R)

== Pigeons and doves ==
Order: Columbiformes Family: Columbidae

Pigeons and doves are stout-bodied birds with short necks and short slender bills with a fleshy cere.

- Mourning dove (spetsstjärtad duva) Zenaida macroura (R)
- Oriental turtle dove (större turturduva) Streptopelia orientalis (R)
- European turtle dove (turturduva) Streptopelia turtur (O)
- Eurasian collared dove (turkduva) Streptopelia decaocto (B)
- Common wood pigeon (ringduva) Columba palumbus (B)
- Rock dove / feral pigeon (klippduva / tamduva) Columba livia (B) (I)
- Stock dove (skogsduva) Columba oenas (B)
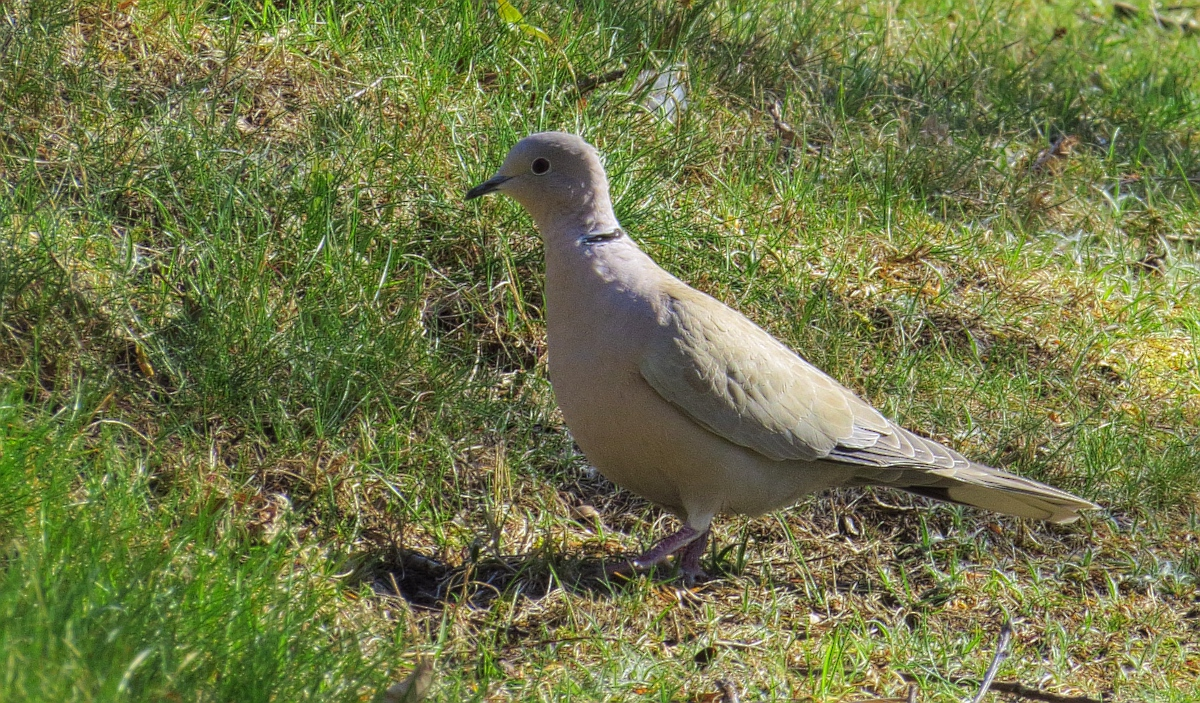
Eurasian collared dove, Varberg, Halland

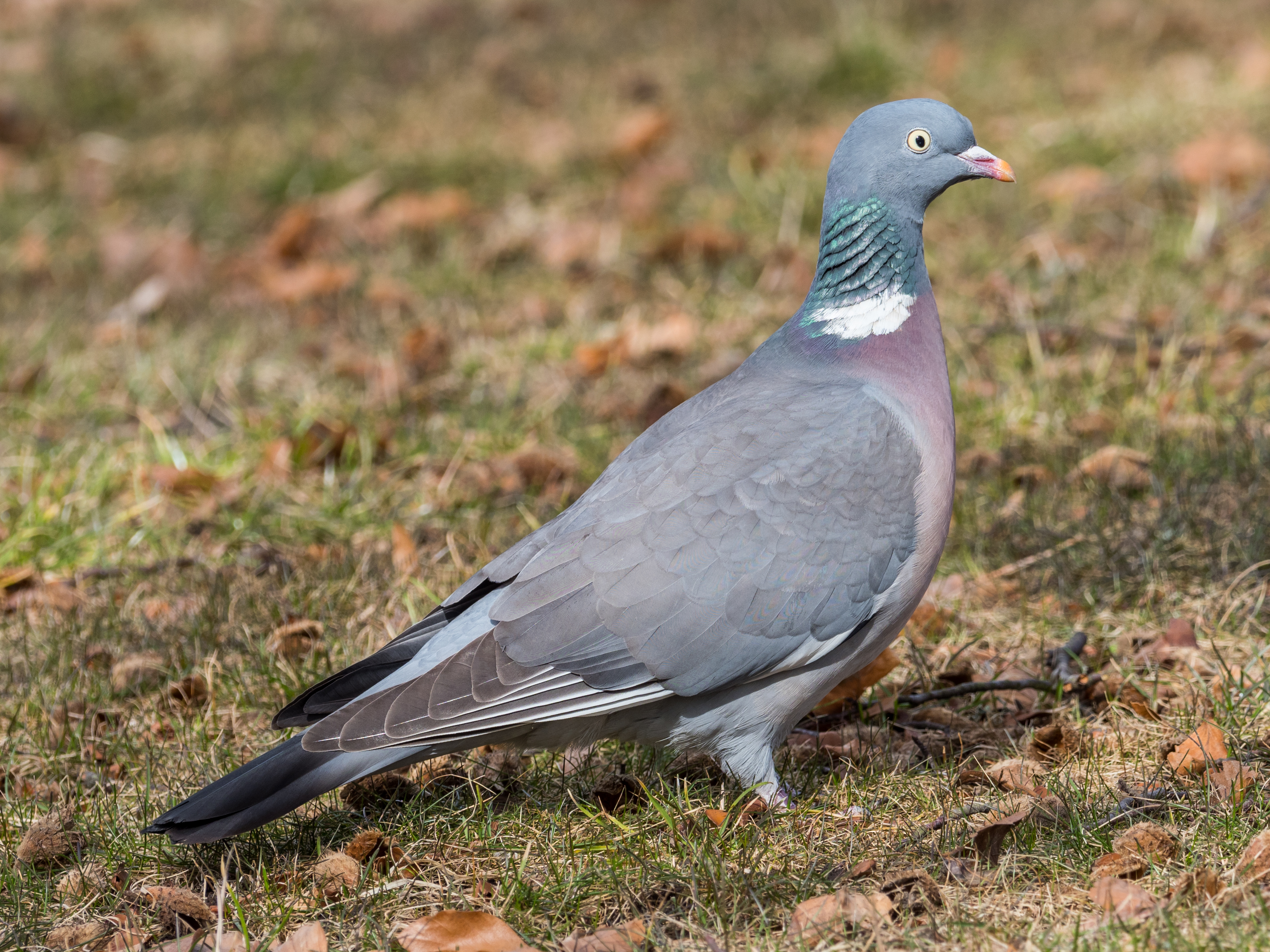
Common wood pigeon, Vaxholm, Stockholm

== Cranes ==
Order: Gruiformes Family: Gruidae

Cranes are large, long-legged, and long-necked birds. Unlike the similar-looking but unrelated herons, cranes fly with necks outstretched, not pulled back. Most have elaborate and noisy courting displays or "dances".

- Sandhill crane (prärietrana) Antigone canadensis (R)
- Demoiselle crane (jungfrutrana) Grus virgo (R)
- Common crane (trana) Grus grus (B)
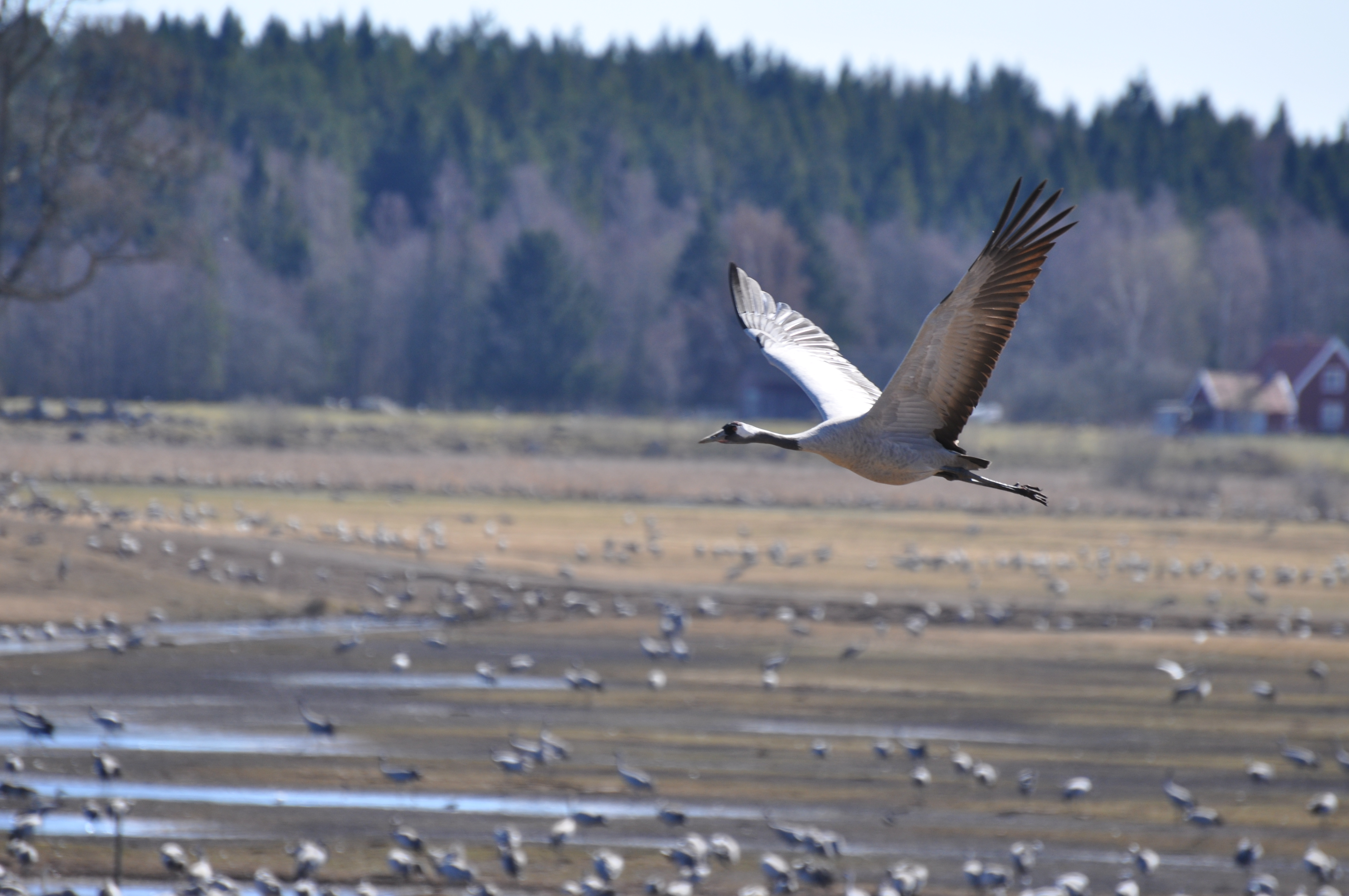
Common crane, Lake Hornborga, Västergötland

== Rails, gallinules, and coots ==
Order: Gruiformes Family: Rallidae

Rallidae is a large family of small to medium-sized birds which includes the rails, crakes, coots, and gallinules. Typically they inhabit dense vegetation in damp environments near lakes, swamps, or rivers. In general they are shy and secretive birds, making them difficult to observe. Most species have strong legs and long toes which are well adapted to soft uneven surfaces. They tend to have short, rounded wings and to be weak fliers.

- Water rail (vattenrall) Rallus aquaticus (B)
- Corn crake (kornknarr) Crex crex (B)
- Sora (karolinasumphöna) Porzana carolina (R)
- Spotted crake (småfläckig sumphöna) Porzana porzana (B)
- Common moorhen (rörhöna) Gallinula chloropus (B)
- Eurasian coot (sothöna) Fulica atra (B)
- Little crake (mindre sumphöna) Zapornia parva (O)
- Baillon's crake (dvärgsumphöna) Zapornia pusilla (R)
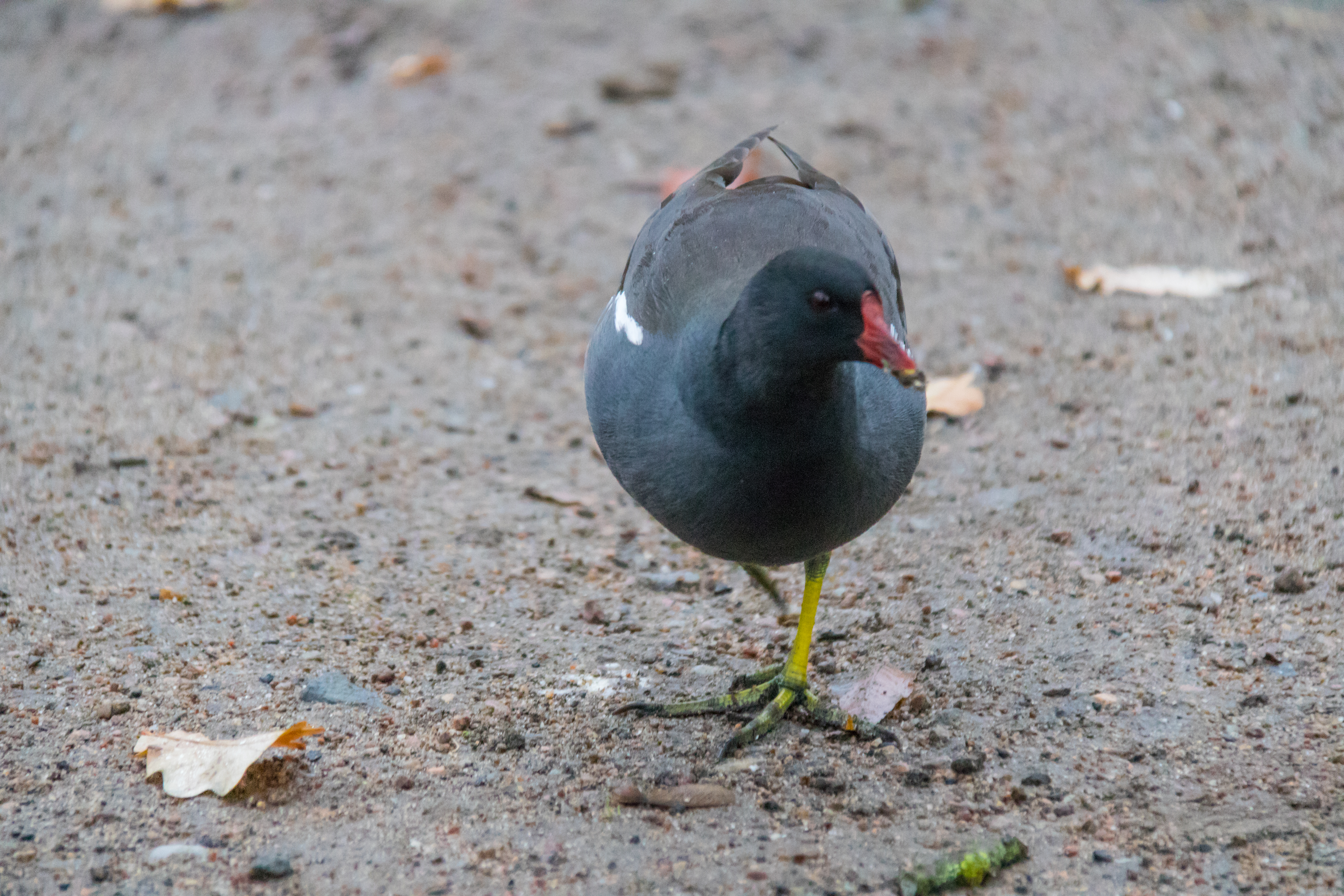
Common moorhen, Stadsparken, Lund, Scania

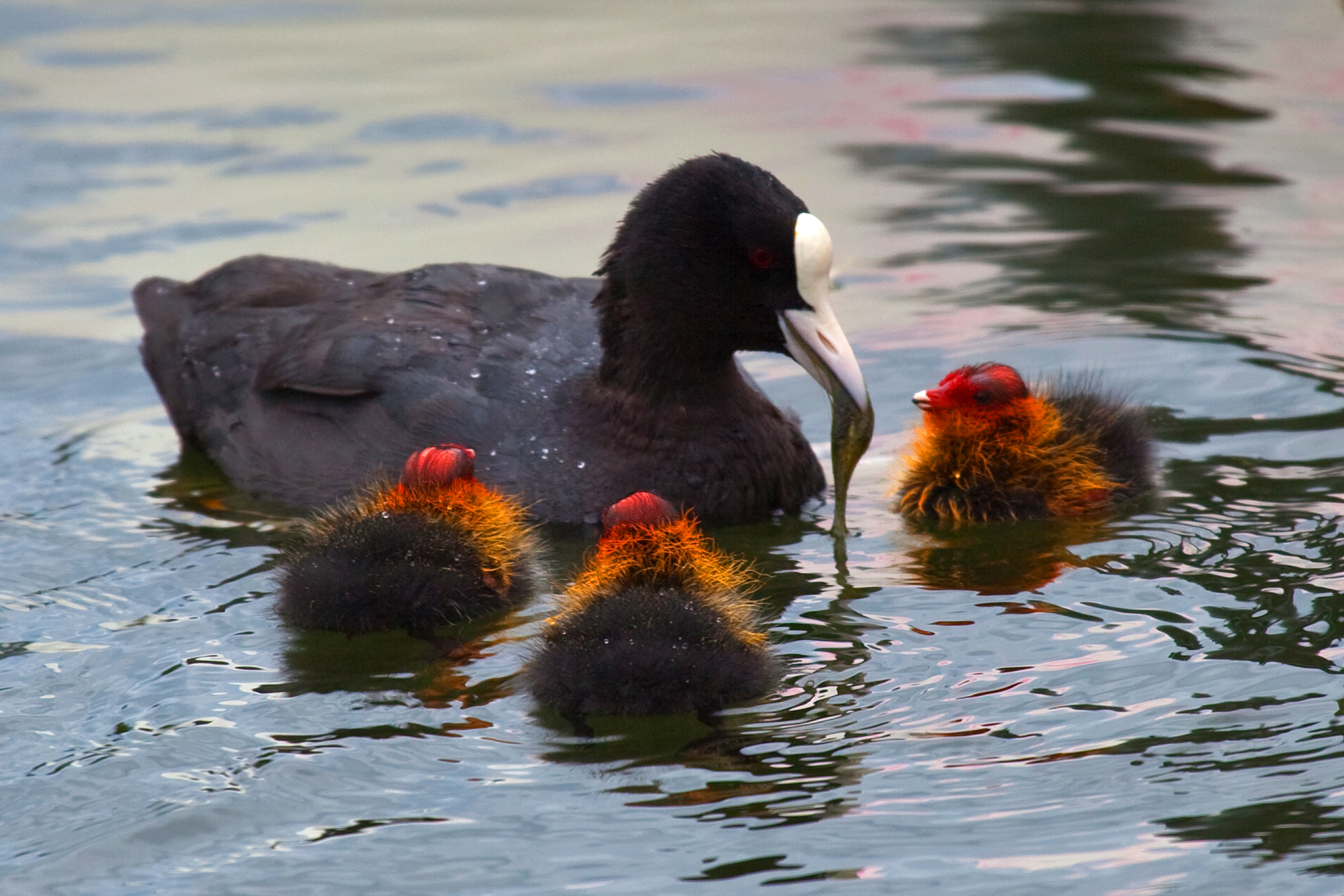
Eurasian coot, Vaxholm, Stockholm

== Stone-curlews ==
Order: Charadriiformes Family: Burhinidae

The stone-curlews are a group of waders found worldwide within the tropical zone, with some species also breeding in temperate Europe and Australia. They are medium to large waders with strong black or yellow-black bills, large yellow eyes, and cryptic plumage. Despite being classed as waders, most species have a preference for arid or semi-arid habitats.

- Eurasian stone-curlew (tjockfot) Burhinus oedicnemus (R)

== Stilts and avocets ==
Order: Charadriiformes Family: Recurvirostridae

Recurvirostridae is a family of large wading birds which includes the stilts and avocets. The stilts have extremely long legs and long, thin, straight bills. The avocets have long legs and long up-curved bills.

- Pied avocet (skärfläcka) Recurvirostra avosetta (B)
- Black-winged stilt (styltlöpare) Himantopus himantopus (R)
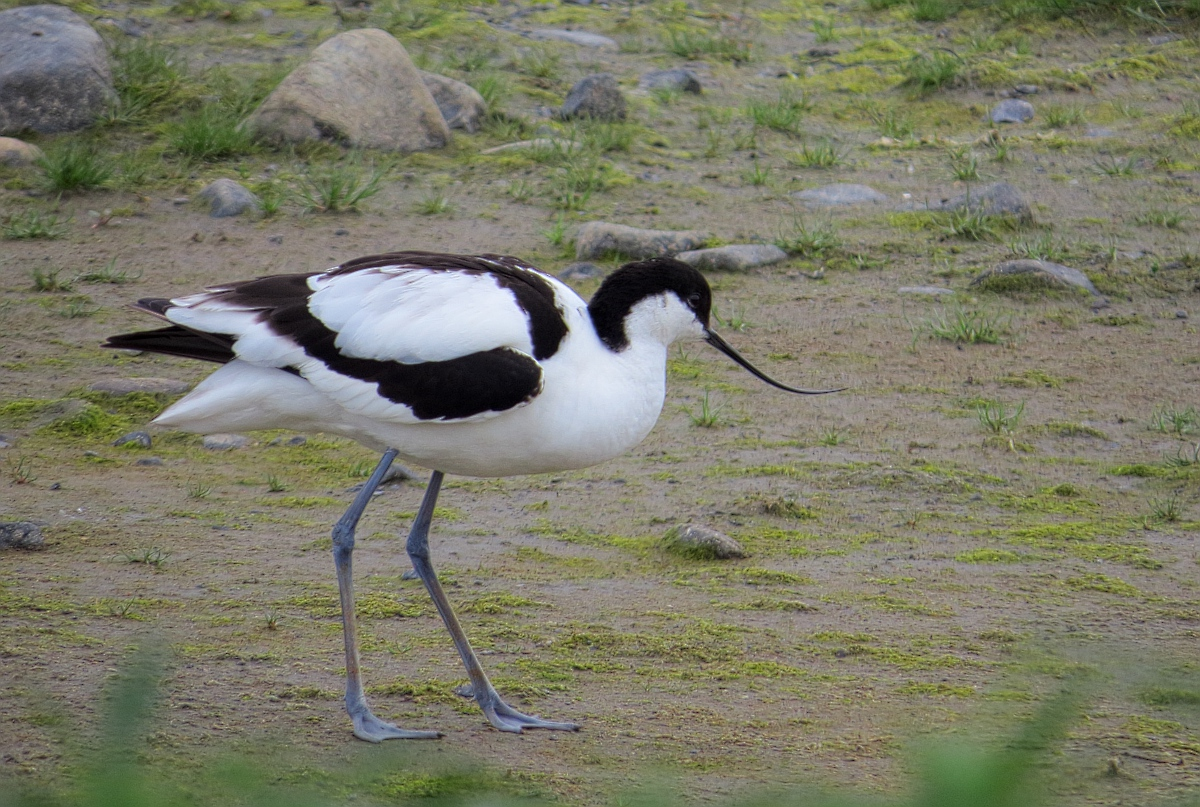
Pied avocet, Morups Tånge, Falkenberg, Halland

== Oystercatchers ==
Order: Charadriiformes Family: Haematopodidae

The oystercatchers are large and noisy plover-like birds, with strong bills used for smashing or prising open molluscs and probing for worms.

- Eurasian oystercatcher (strandskata) Haematopus ostralegus (B)
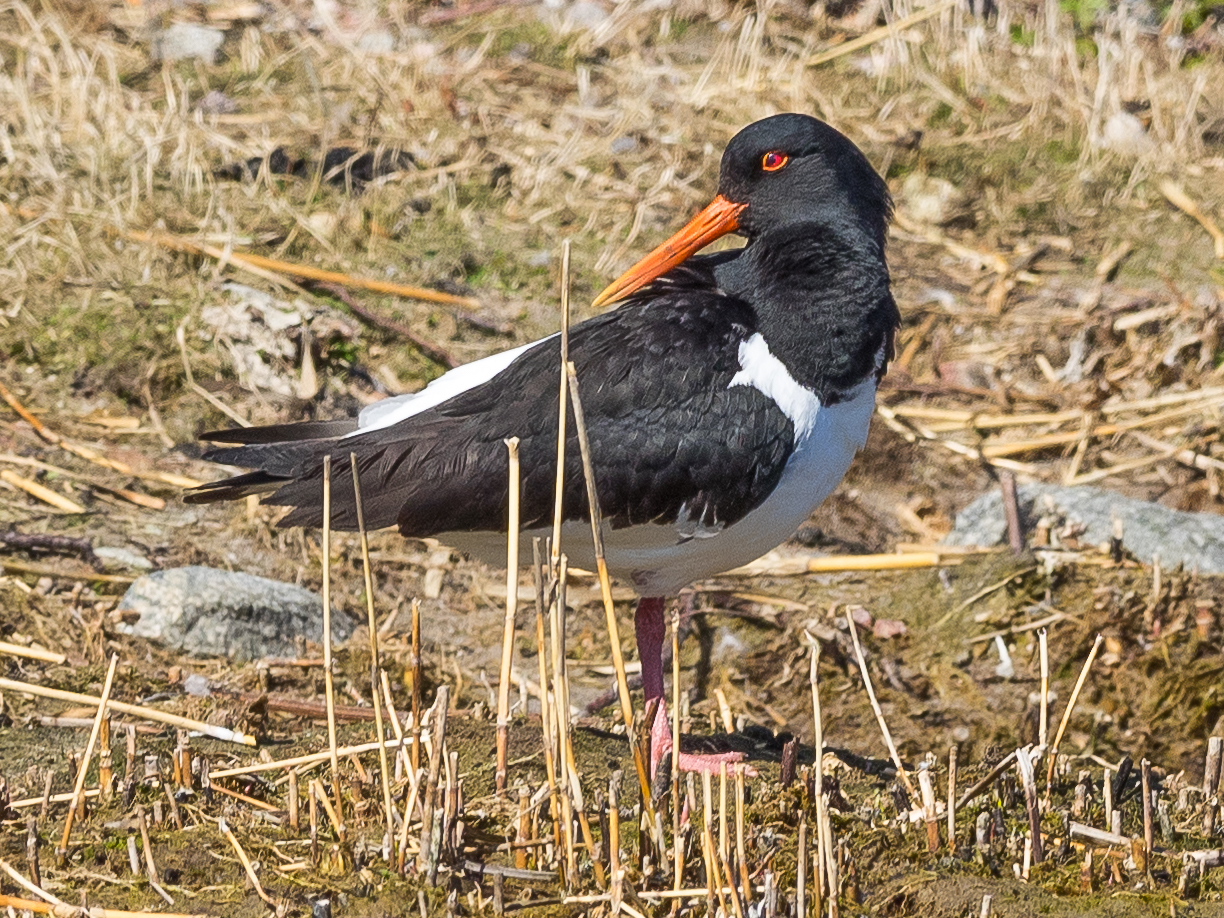
Eurasian oystercatcher, Vaxholm, Stockholm

== Plovers and lapwings ==
Order: Charadriiformes Family: Charadriidae

The family Charadriidae includes the plovers, dotterels, and lapwings. They are small to medium-sized birds with compact bodies, short thick necks, and long, usually pointed, wings. They are found in open country worldwide, mostly in habitats near water.

- Grey plover (kustpipare) Pluvialis squatarola (M)
- European golden plover (ljungpipare) Pluvialis apricaria (B)
- Pacific golden plover (sibirisk tundrapipare) Pluvialis fulva (R)
- American golden plover (amerikansk tundrapipare) Pluvialis dominica (R)
- Eurasian dotterel (fjällpipare) Eudromias morinellus (B)
- Common ringed plover (större strandpipare) Charadrius hiaticula (B)
- Little ringed plover (mindre strandpipare) Thinornis dubius (B)
- Northern lapwing (tofsvipa) Vanellus vanellus (B)
- Grey-headed lapwing (gråhuvad vipa) Vanellus cinereus (R)
- Sociable lapwing (stäppvipa) Vanellus gregarius (R)
- White-tailed lapwing (sumpvipa) Vanellus leucurus (R)
- Caspian plover (kaspisk pipare) Anarhynchus asiaticus (R)
- Oriental plover (orientpipare) Anarhynchus veredus (R)
- Tibetan sand plover (tibetpipare) Anarhynchus atrifrons (R)
- Siberian sand plover (kamtjatkapipare) Anarhynchus mongolus (R)
- Greater sand plover (ökenpipare) Anarhynchus leschenaultii (R)
- Kentish plover (svartbent strandpipare) Anarhynchus alexandrinus (O)
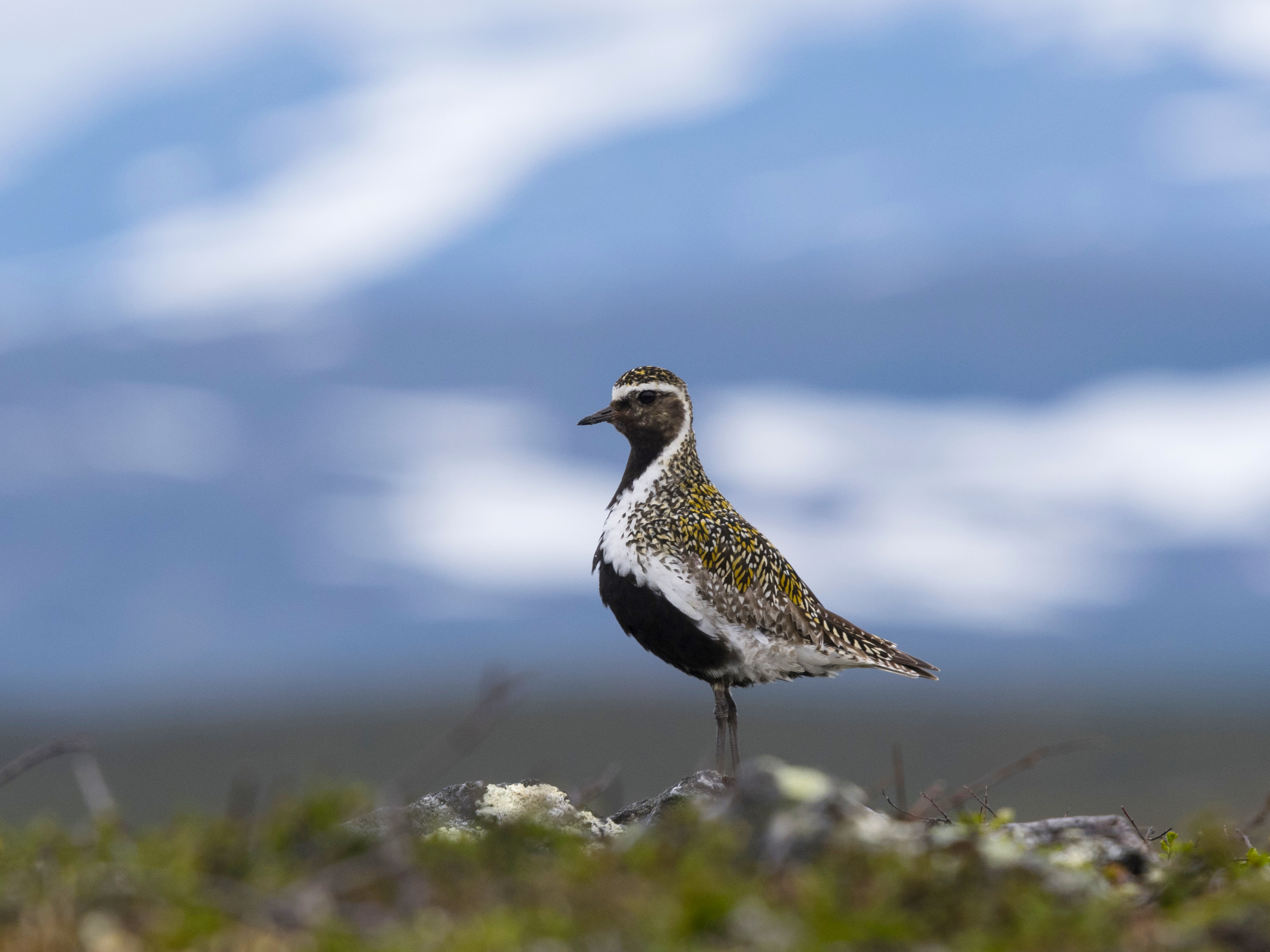
European golden plover, Flatruet, Härjedalen

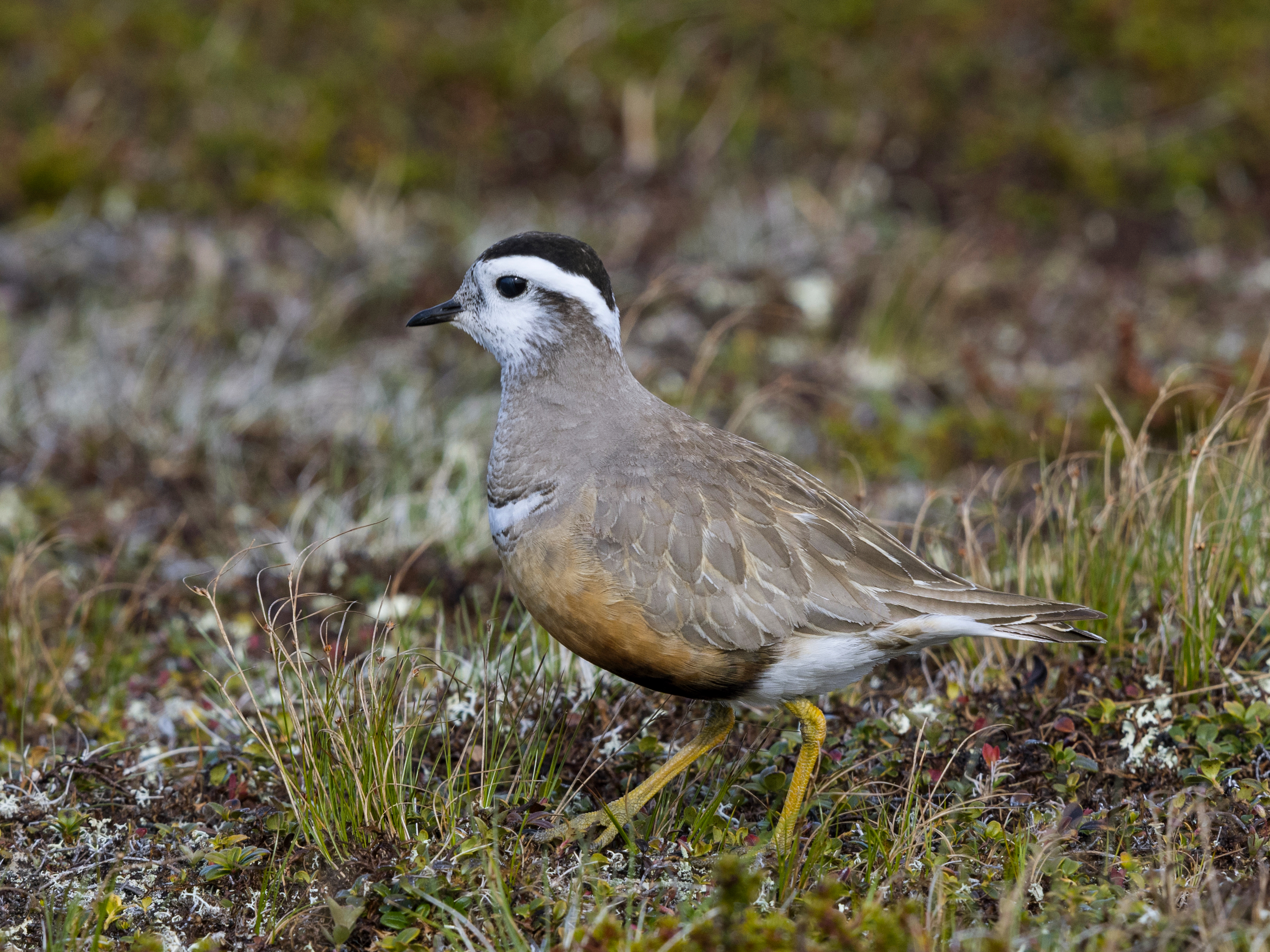
Eurasian dotterel, Idre, Dalarna

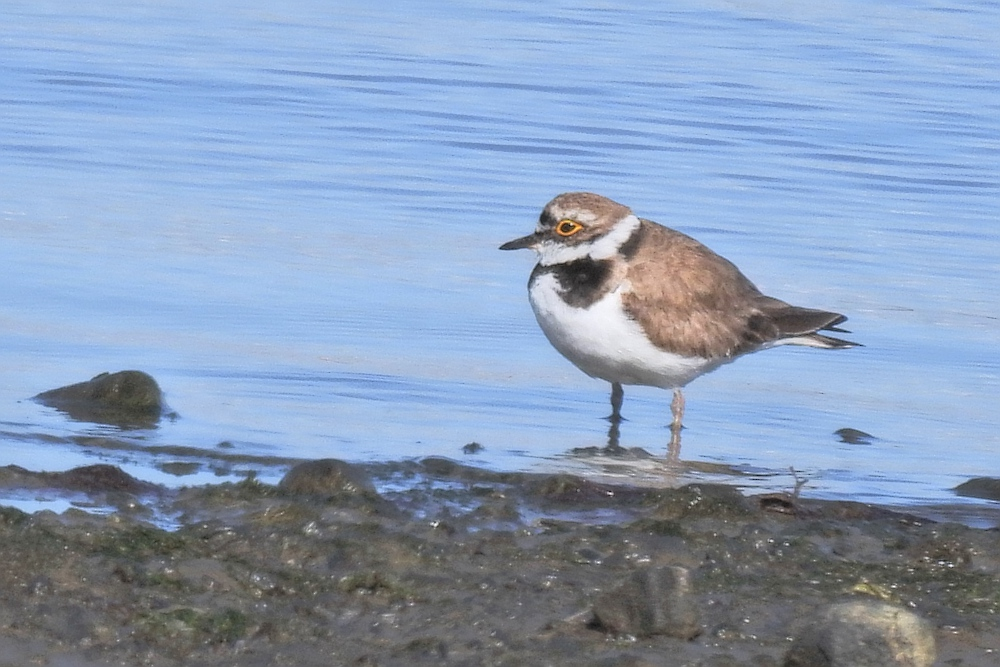
Little ringed plover, Morups Tånge, Falkenberg, Halland

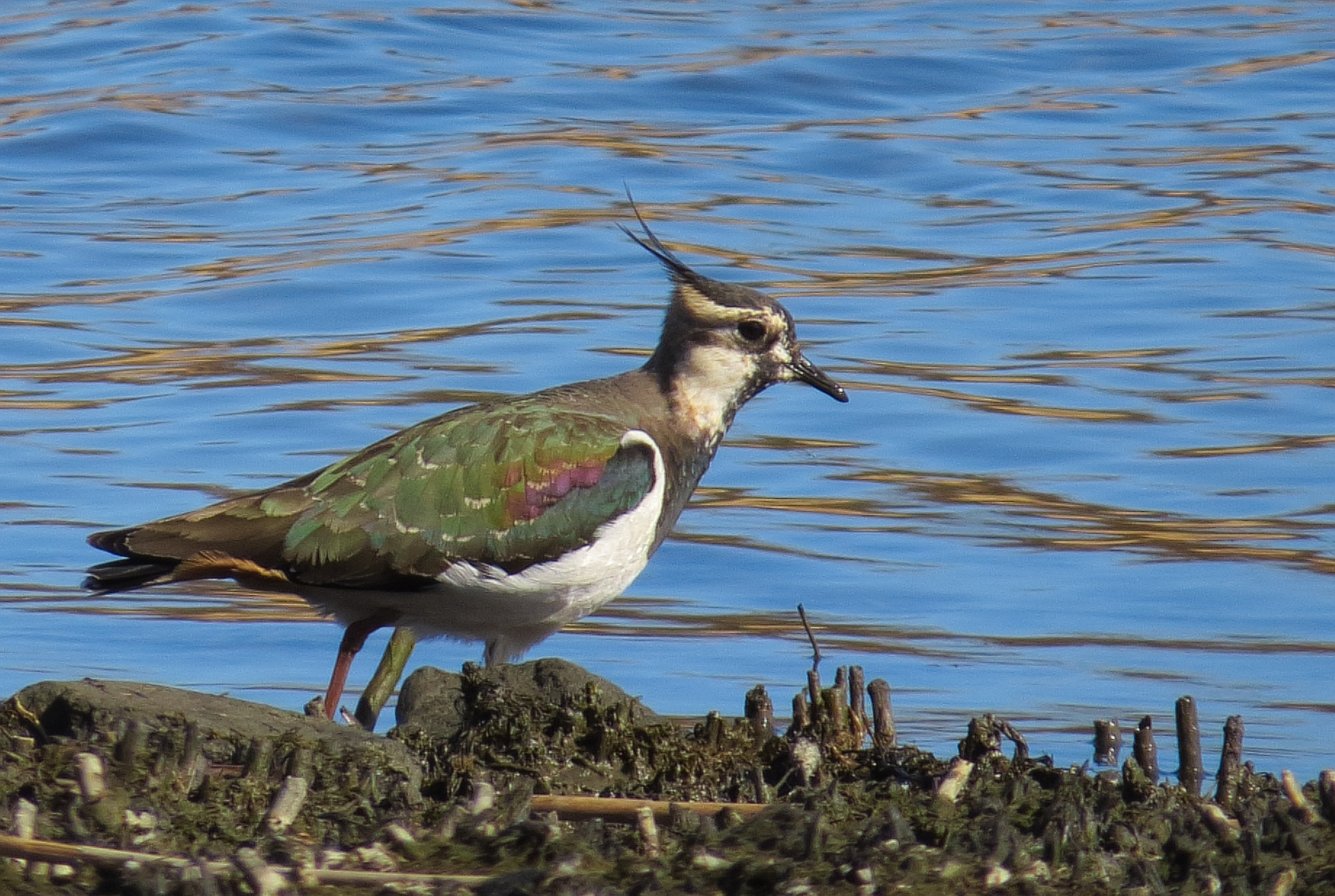
Northern lapwing, Gothenburg

== Sandpipers and allies ==
Order: Charadriiformes Family: Scolopacidae

Scolopacidae is a large diverse family of small to medium-sized shorebirds including the sandpipers, curlews, godwits, shanks, tattlers, woodcocks, snipes, dowitchers, and phalaropes. The majority of these species eat small invertebrates picked out of the mud or soil. Variation in length of legs and bills enables multiple species to feed in the same habitat, particularly on the coast, without direct competition for food.

- Upland sandpiper (piparsnäppa) Bartramia longicauda (R)
- Little curlew (dvärgspov) Numenius minutus (R)
- Eurasian whimbrel (småspov) Numenius phaeopus (B)
- Eurasian curlew (storspov) Numenius arquata (B)
- Bar-tailed godwit (myrspov) Limosa lapponica (B)
- Black-tailed godwit (rödspov) Limosa limosa (B)
- Hudsonian godwit (hudsonspov) Limosa haemastica (R)
- Long-billed dowitcher (större beckasinsnäppa) Limnodromus scolopaceus (R)
- Short-billed dowitcher (mindre beckasinsnäppa) Limnodromus griseus (R)
- Jack snipe (dvärgbeckasin) Lymnocryptes minimus (B)
- Eurasian woodcock (morkulla) Scolopax rusticola (B)
- Great snipe (dubbelbeckasin) Gallinago media (B)
- Wilson's snipe (amerikansk beckasin) Gallinago delicata (R)
- Common snipe (enkelbeckasin) Gallinago gallinago (B)
- Terek sandpiper (tereksnäppa) Xenus cinereus (O)
- Common sandpiper (drillsnäppa) Actitis hypoleucos (B)
- Spotted sandpiper (fläckdrillsnäppa) Actitis macularius (R)
- Wilson's phalarope (präriesimsnäppa) Phalaropus tricolor (R)
- Red phalarope (brednäbbad simsnäppa) Phalaropus fulicarius (O)
- Red-necked phalarope (smalnäbbad simsnäppa) Phalaropus lobatus (B)
- Green sandpiper (skogssnäppa) Tringa ochropus (B)
- Solitary sandpiper (amerikansk skogssnäppa) Tringa solitaria (R)
- Grey-tailed tattler (sibirisk gråsnäppa) Tringa brevipes (R)
- Marsh sandpiper (dammsnäppa) Tringa stagnatilis (O)
- Wood sandpiper (grönbena) Tringa glareola (B)
- Common redshank (rödbena) Tringa totanus (B)
- Lesser yellowlegs (mindre gulbena) Tringa flavipes (R)
- Spotted redshank (svartsnäppa) Tringa erythropus (B)
- Common greenshank (gluttsnäppa) Tringa nebularia (B)
- Greater yellowlegs (större gulbena) Tringa melanoleuca (R)
- Ruddy turnstone (roskarl) Arenaria interpres (B)
- Red knot (kustsnäppa) Calidris canutus (M)
- Great knot (kolymasnäppa) Calidris tenuirostris (R)
- Ruff (brushane) Calidris pugnax (B)
- Sharp-tailed sandpiper (spetsstjärtad snäppa) Calidris acuminata (R)
- Broad-billed sandpiper (myrsnäppa) Calidris falcinellus (B)
- Curlew sandpiper (spovsnäppa) Calidris ferruginea (M)
- Stilt sandpiper (styltsnäppa) Calidris himantopus (R)
- Red-necked stint (rödhalsad snäppa) Calidris ruficollis (R)
- Temminck's stint (mosnäppa) Calidris temminckii (B)
- Long-toed stint (långtåsnäppa) Calidris subminuta (R)
- Buff-breasted sandpiper (prärielöpare) Calidris subruficollis (O)
- Sanderling (sandlöpare) Calidris alba (M)
- Dunlin (kärrsnäppa) Calidris alpina (B)
- Purple sandpiper (skärsnäppa) Calidris maritima (B)
- Baird's sandpiper (gulbröstad snäppa) Calidris bairdii (R)
- Pectoral sandpiper (tuvsnäppa) Calidris melanotos (O)
- Semipalmated sandpiper (sandsnäppa) Calidris pusilla (R)
- Western sandpiper (tundrasnäppa) Calidris mauri (R)
- Little stint (småsnäppa) Calidris minuta (M)
- Least sandpiper (dvärgsnäppa) Calidris minutilla (R)
- White-rumped sandpiper (vitgumpsnäppa) Calidris fuscicollis (R)
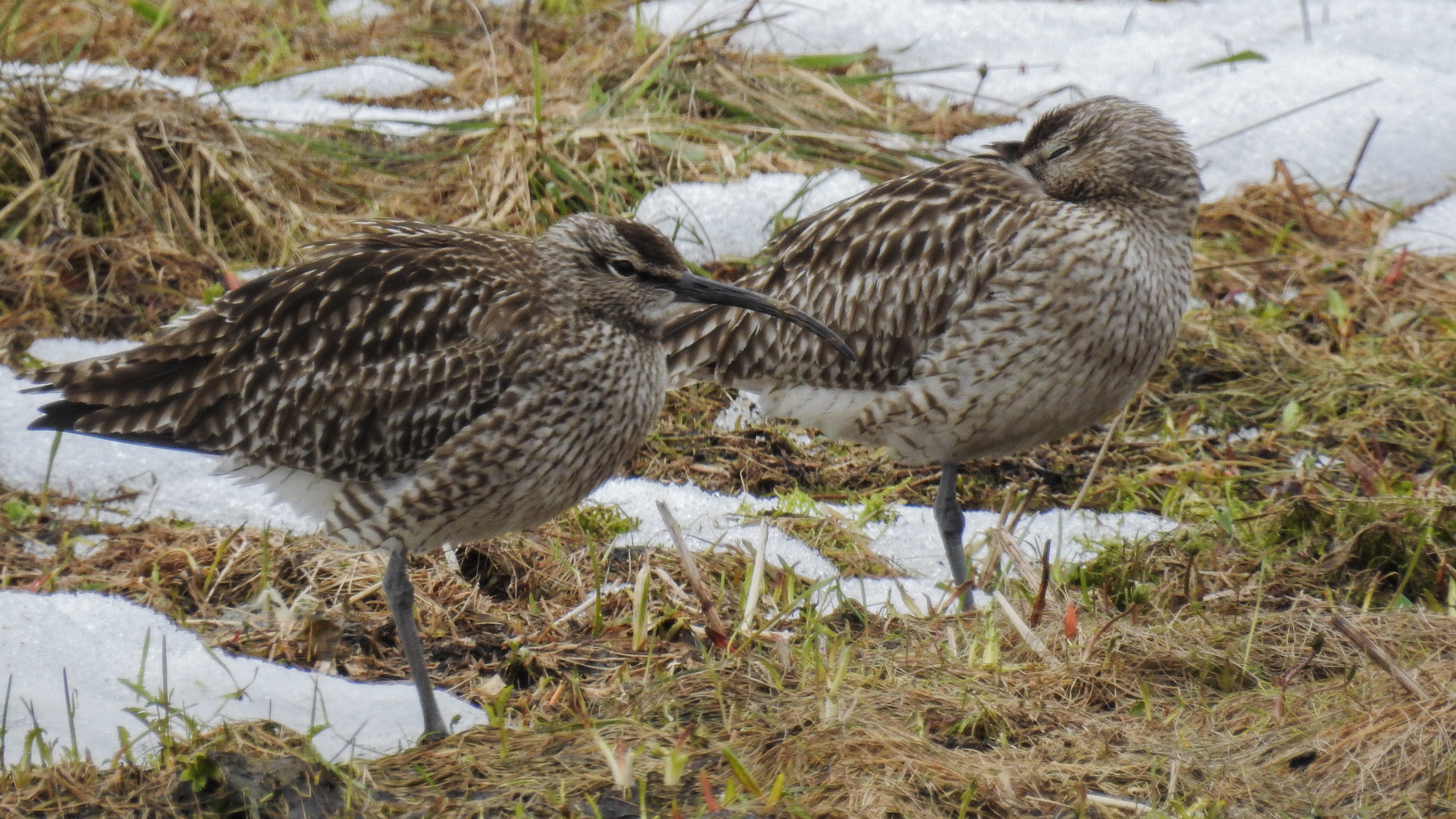
Eurasian whimbrel, Huuki, Norrbottens Län

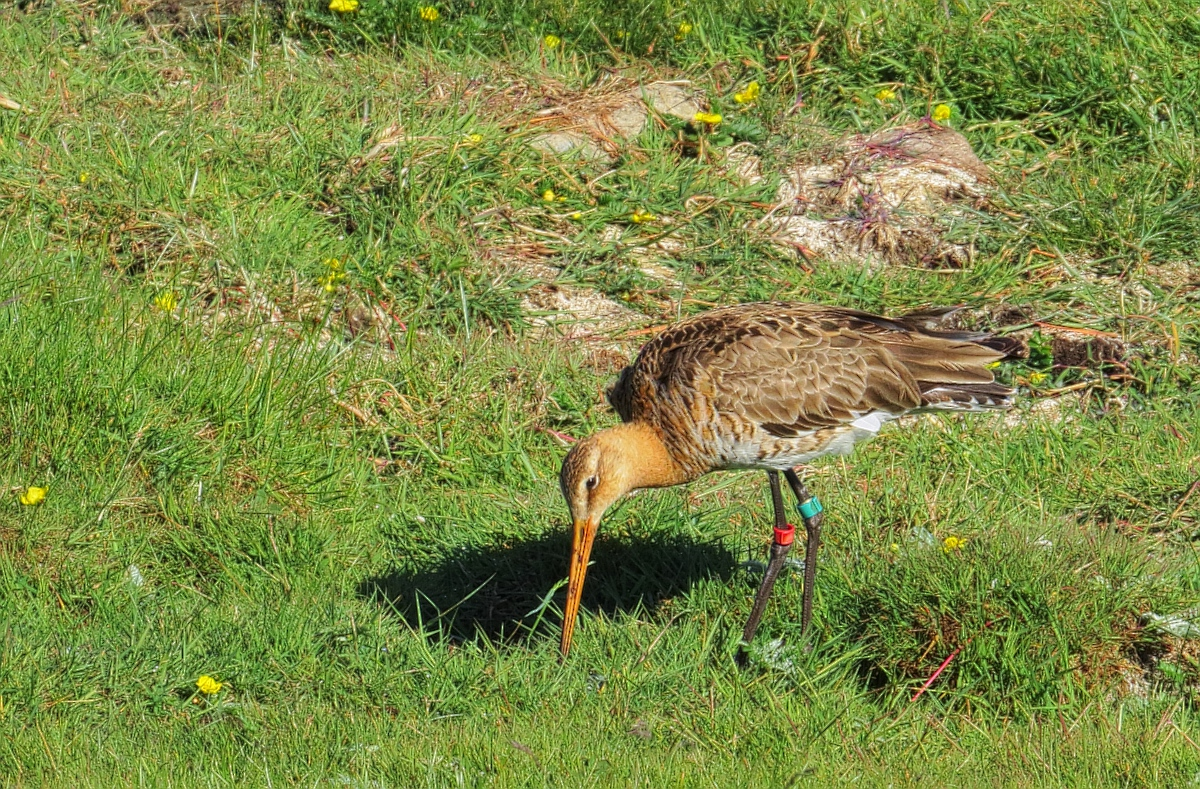
Black-tailed godwit, Ottenby, Öland

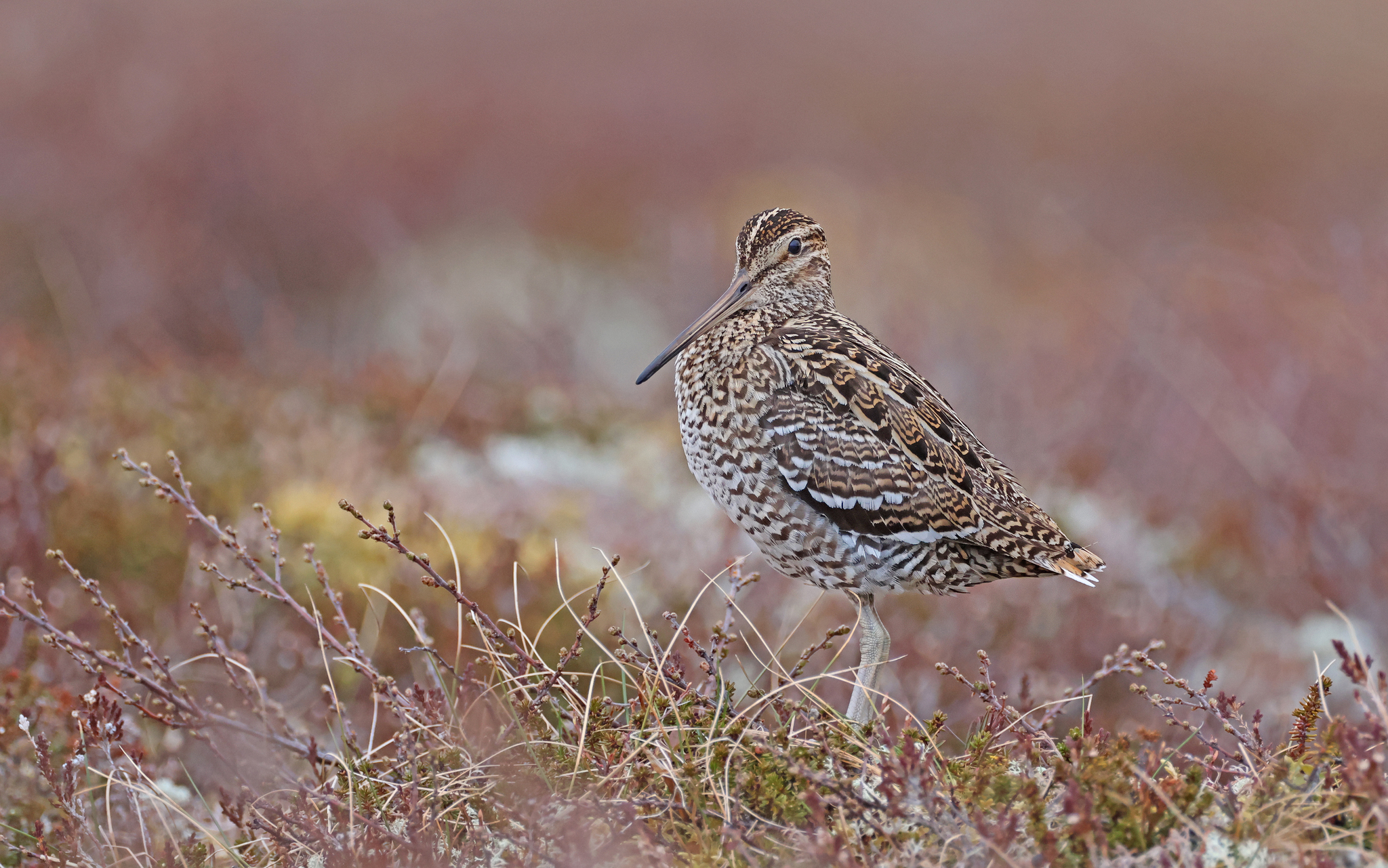
Great snipe, Jämtland

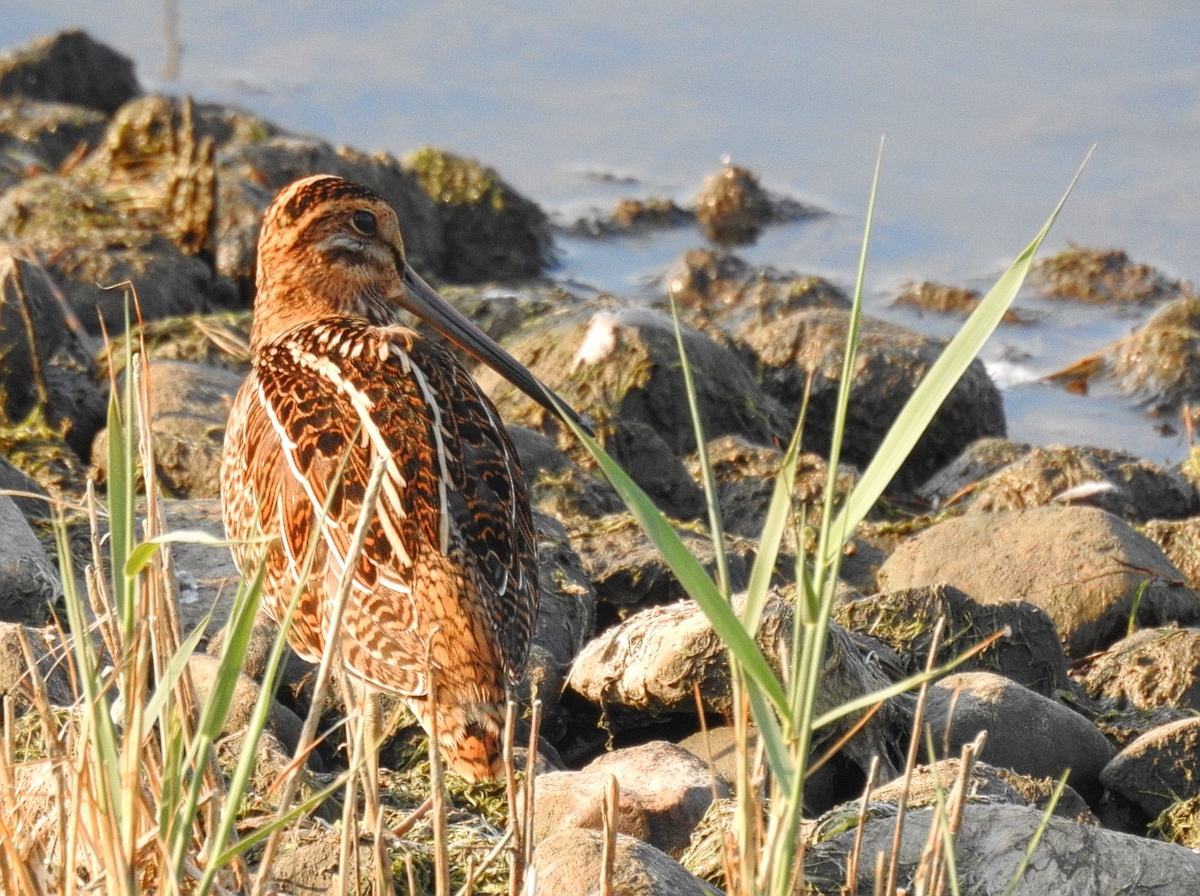
Common snipe, Varberg

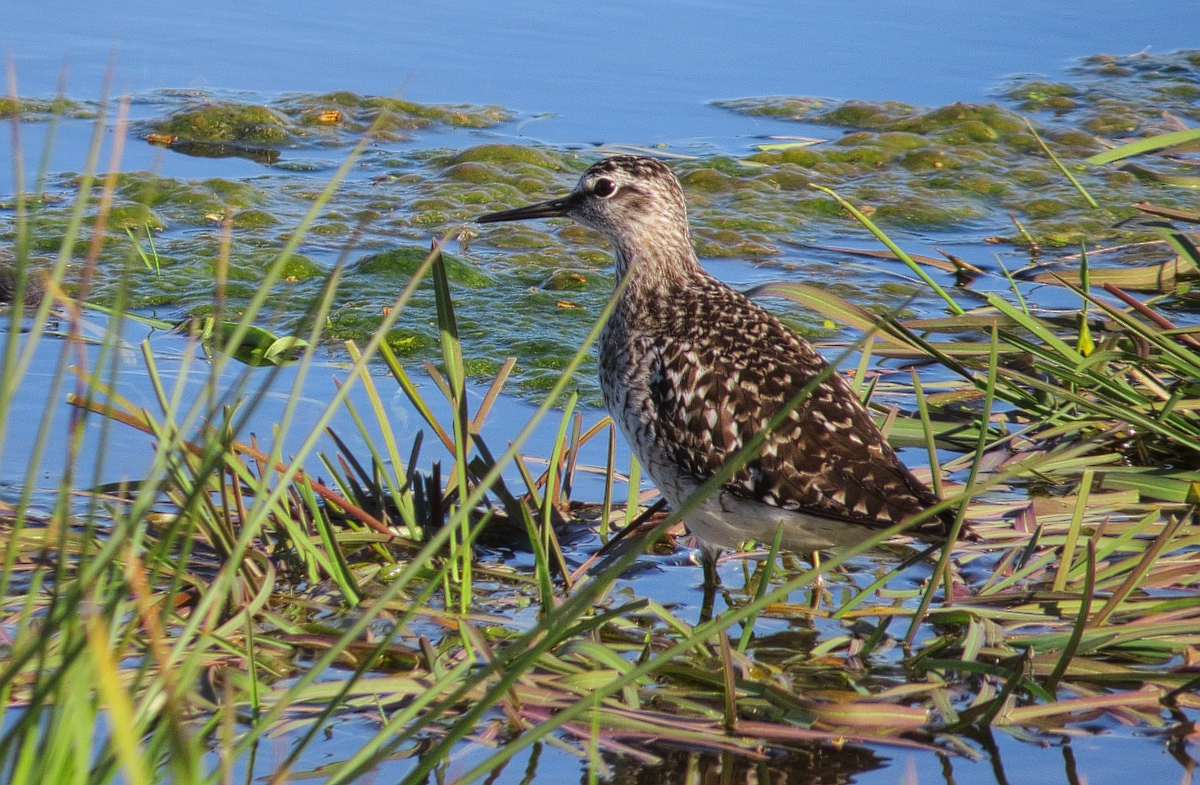
Wood sandpiper, Halmstad

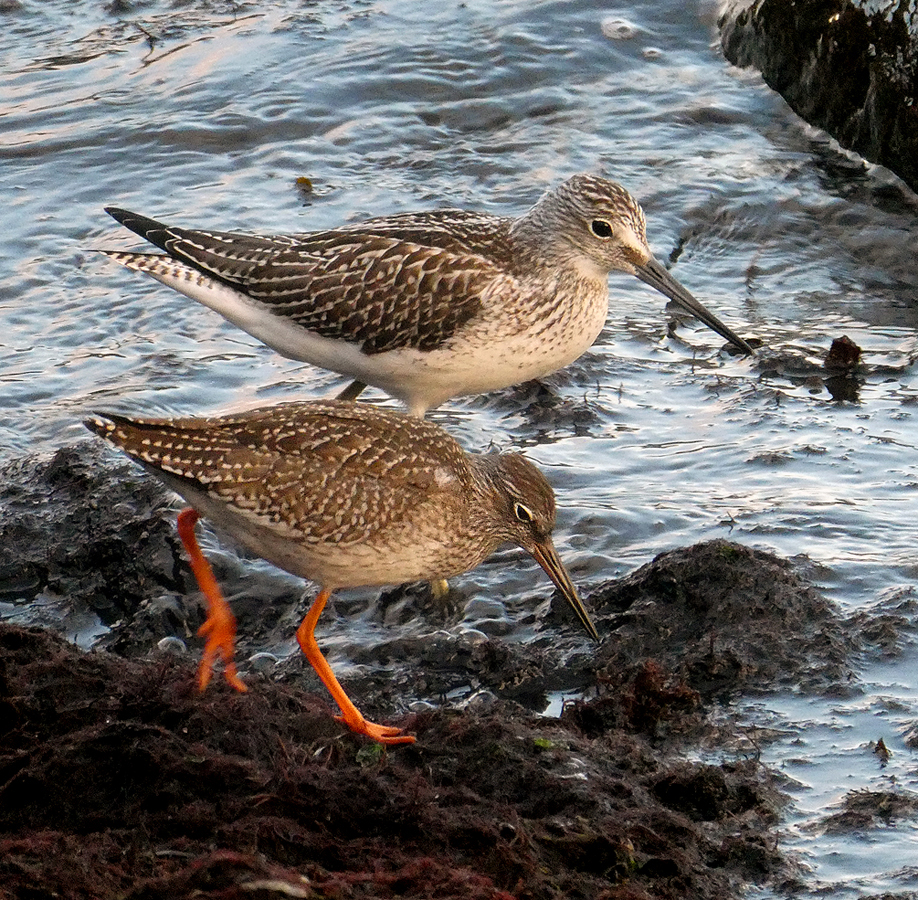
Common redshank (below) with common greenshank (above), Ystad, Scania

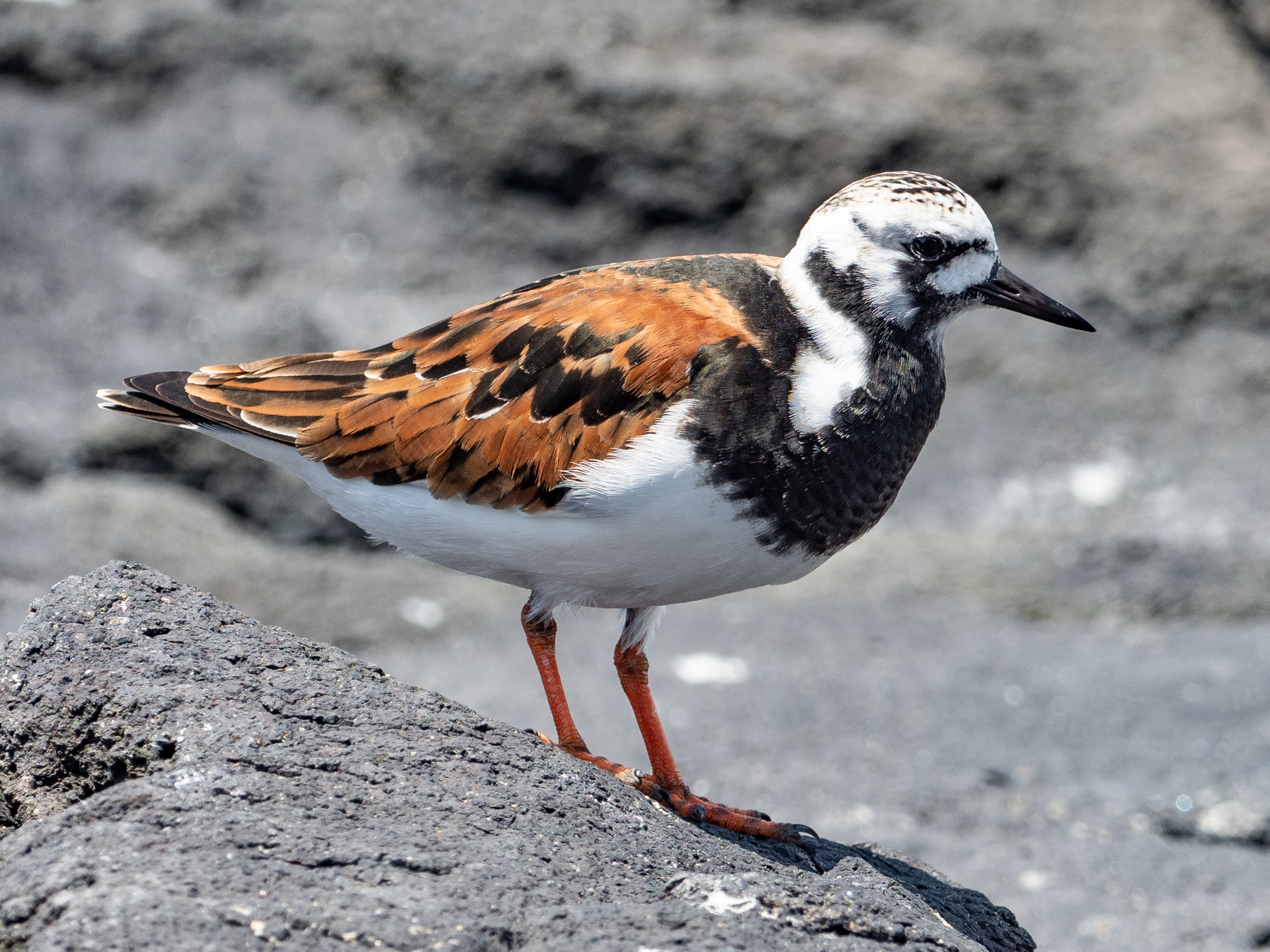
Ruddy turnstone, Vaxholm, Stockholm

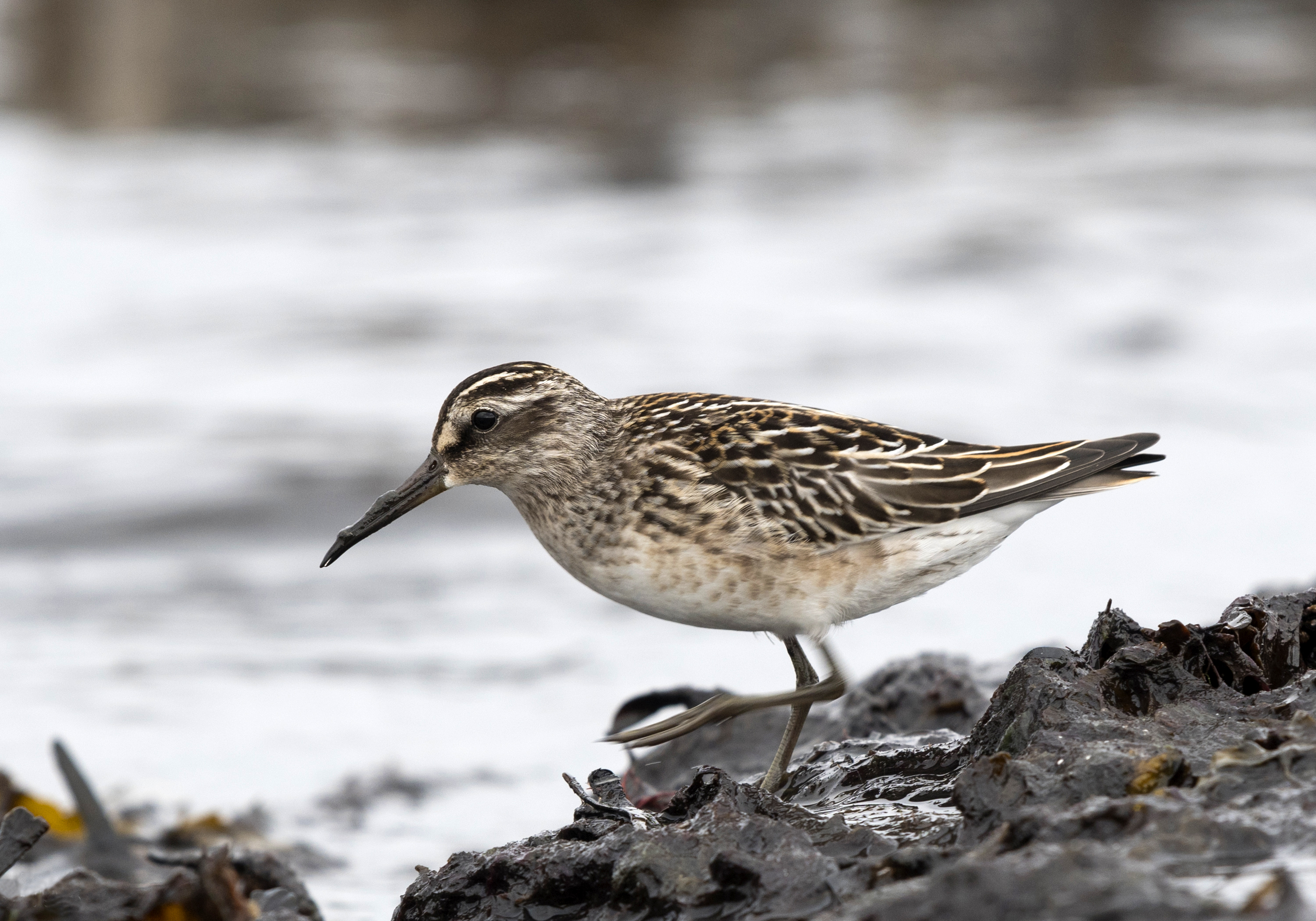
Broad-billed sandpiper, Ottenby, Öland

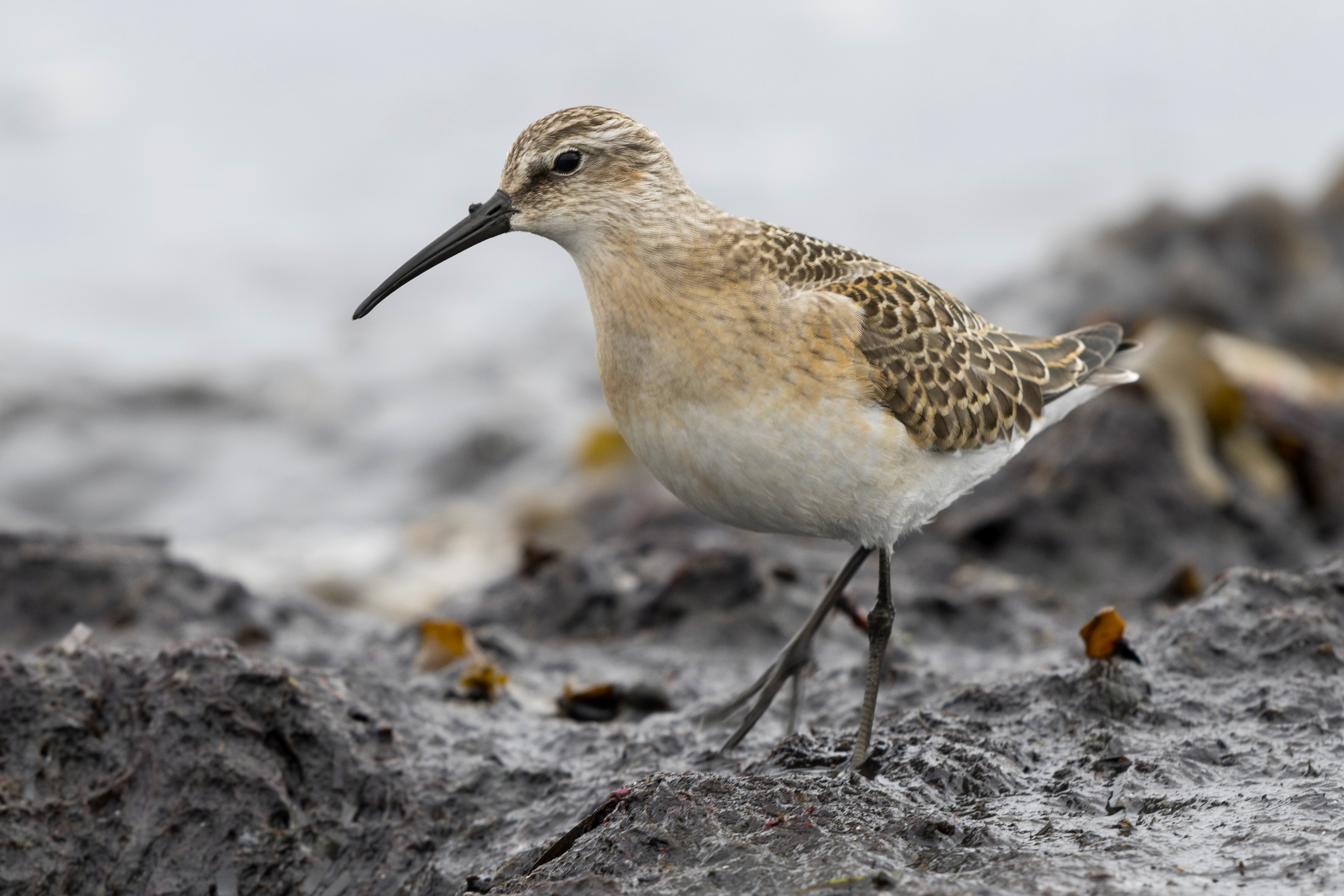
Curlew sandpiper, Ottenby, Öland

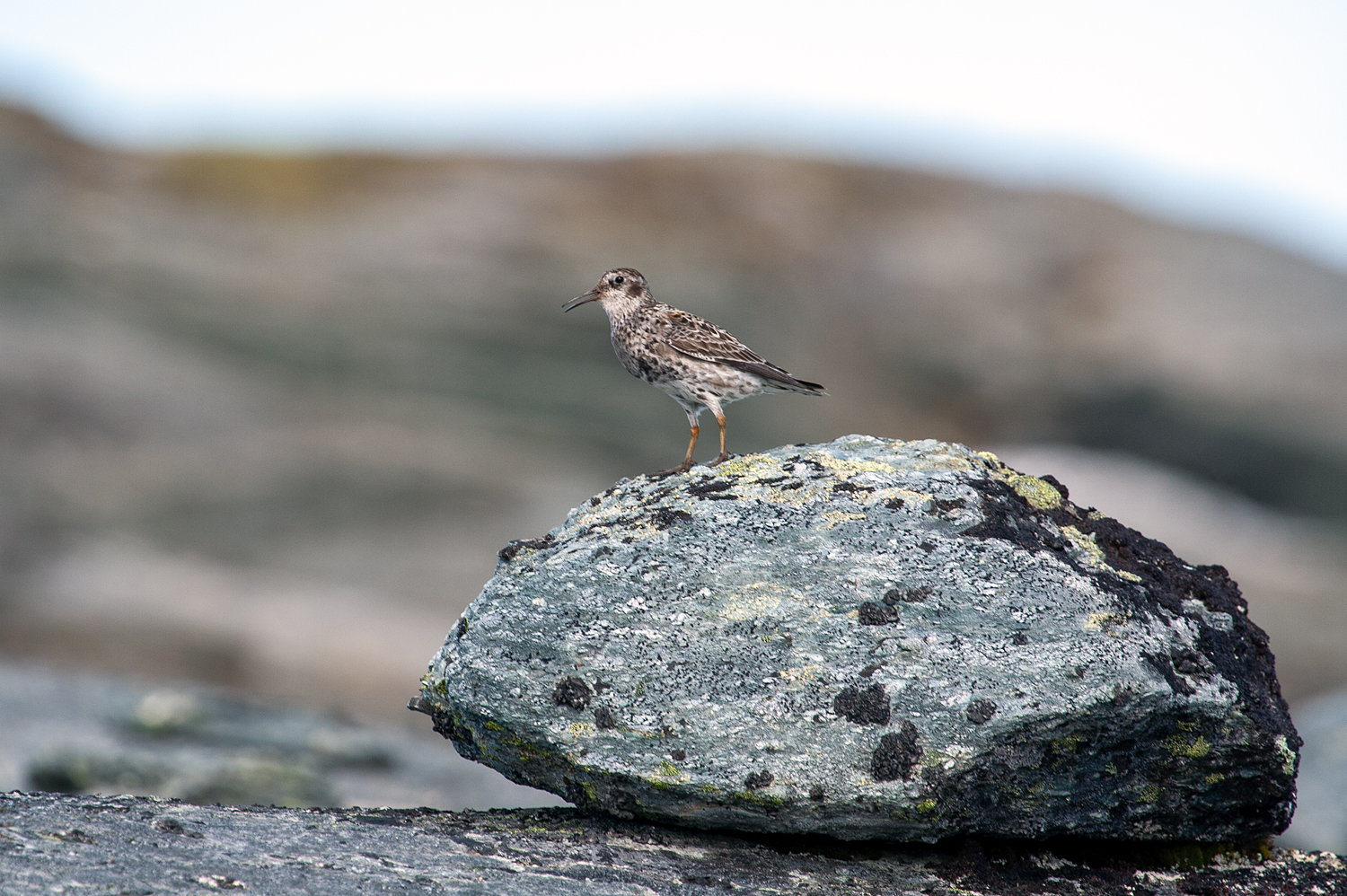
Purple sandpiper, Jokkmokk Municipality, Lapland

== Pratincoles and coursers ==
Order: Charadriiformes Family: Glareolidae

Glareolidae is a family of wading birds comprising the pratincoles, which have short legs, long pointed wings, and long forked tails, and the coursers, which have long legs, short wings, and long, pointed bills which curve downwards.

- Cream-coloured courser (ökenlöpare) Cursorius cursor (R)
- Oriental pratincole (orientvadarsvala) Glareola maldivarum (R)
- Black-winged pratincole (svartvingad vadarsvala) Glareola nordmanni (R)
- Collared pratincole (rödvingad vadarsvala) Glareola pratincola (R)
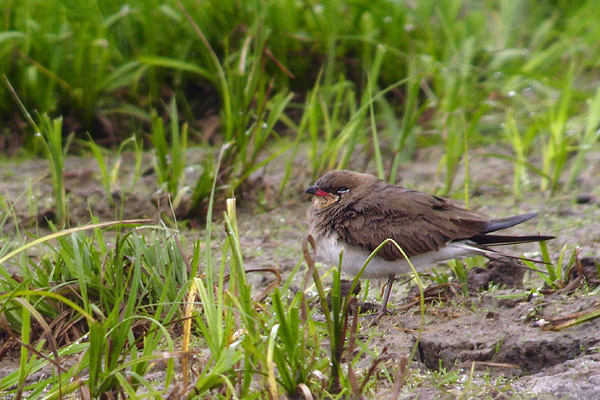
Collared pratincole, near Stockholm

== Skuas and jaegers ==
Order: Charadriiformes Family: Stercorariidae

The family Stercorariidae are, in general, medium to large sea birds, typically with grey or brown plumage, often with white markings on the wings. They nest on the ground in temperate and arctic regions and are long-distance migrants.

- Parasitic jaeger (kustlabb) Stercorarius parasiticus (B)
- Long-tailed jaeger (fjällabb) Stercorarius longicaudus (B)
- Pomarine jaeger (bredstjärtad labb) Stercorarius pomarinus (O)
- Great skua (storlabb) Stercorarius skua (O)

== Auks, murres, and puffins ==
Order: Charadriiformes Family: Alcidae

Alcidae are a family of seabirds which are superficially similar to penguins with their black-and-white plumage, upright posture, and some of their habits, but which are able to fly.

- Tufted puffin (tofslunne) Fratercula cirrhata (R)
- Atlantic puffin (lunnefågel) Fratercula arctica (O)
- Parakeet auklet (papegojalka) Aethia psittacula (R)
- Black guillemot (tobisgrissla) Cepphus grylle (B)
- Razorbill (tordmule) Alca torda (B)
- Great auk (garfågel) Pinguinus impennis (R) – Extinct
- Little auk (alkekung) Alle alle (M)
- Thick-billed murre (spetsbergsgrissla) Uria lomvia (R)
- Common murre (sillgrissla) Uria aalge (B)
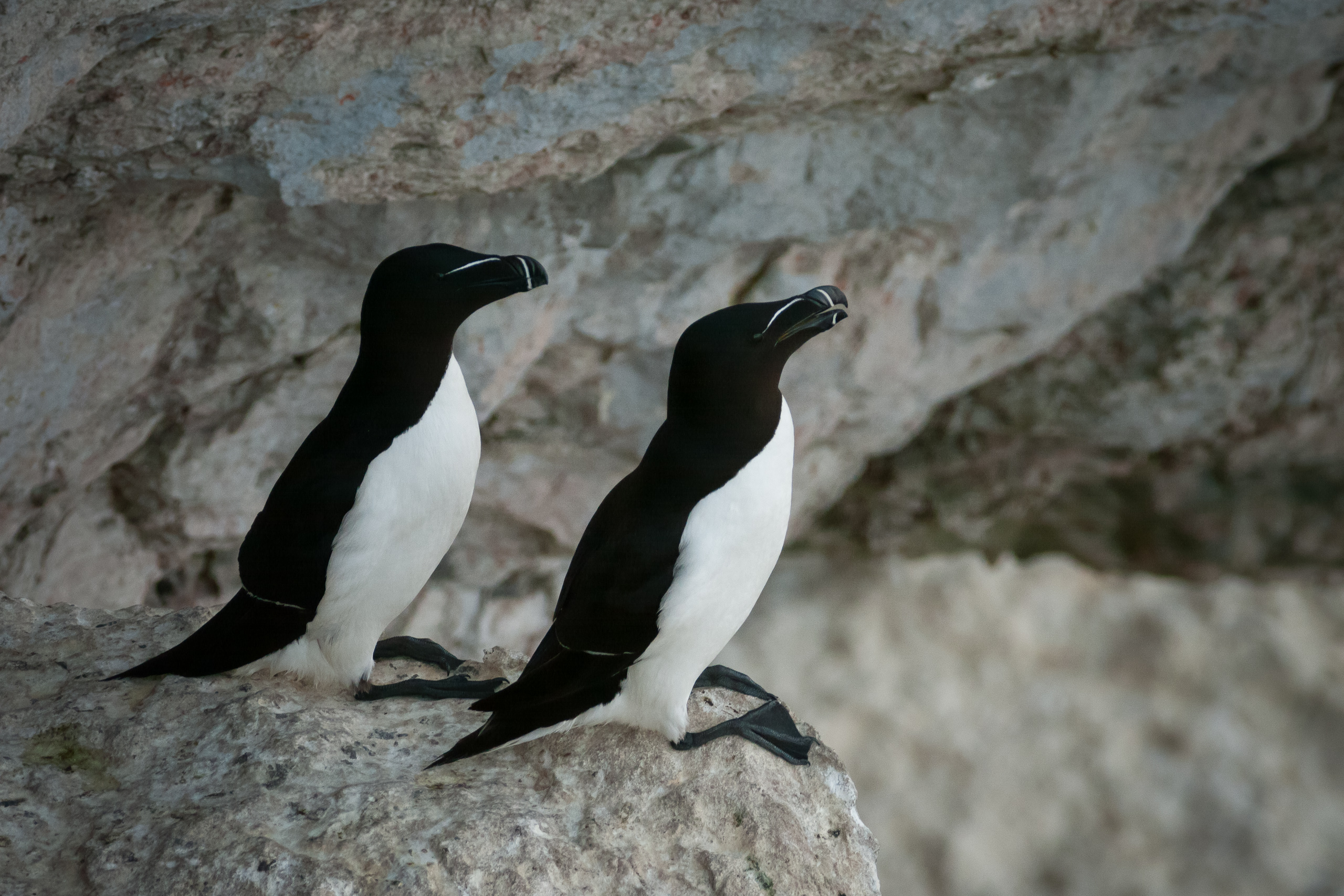
Razorbills, Stora Karlsö

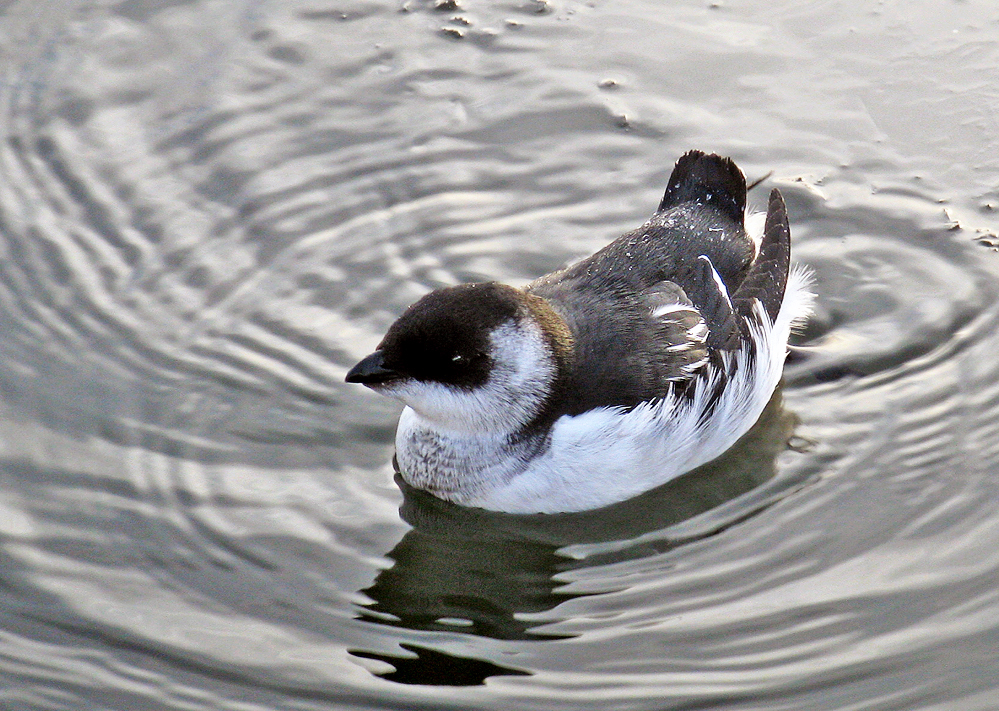
Little auk, Ystad

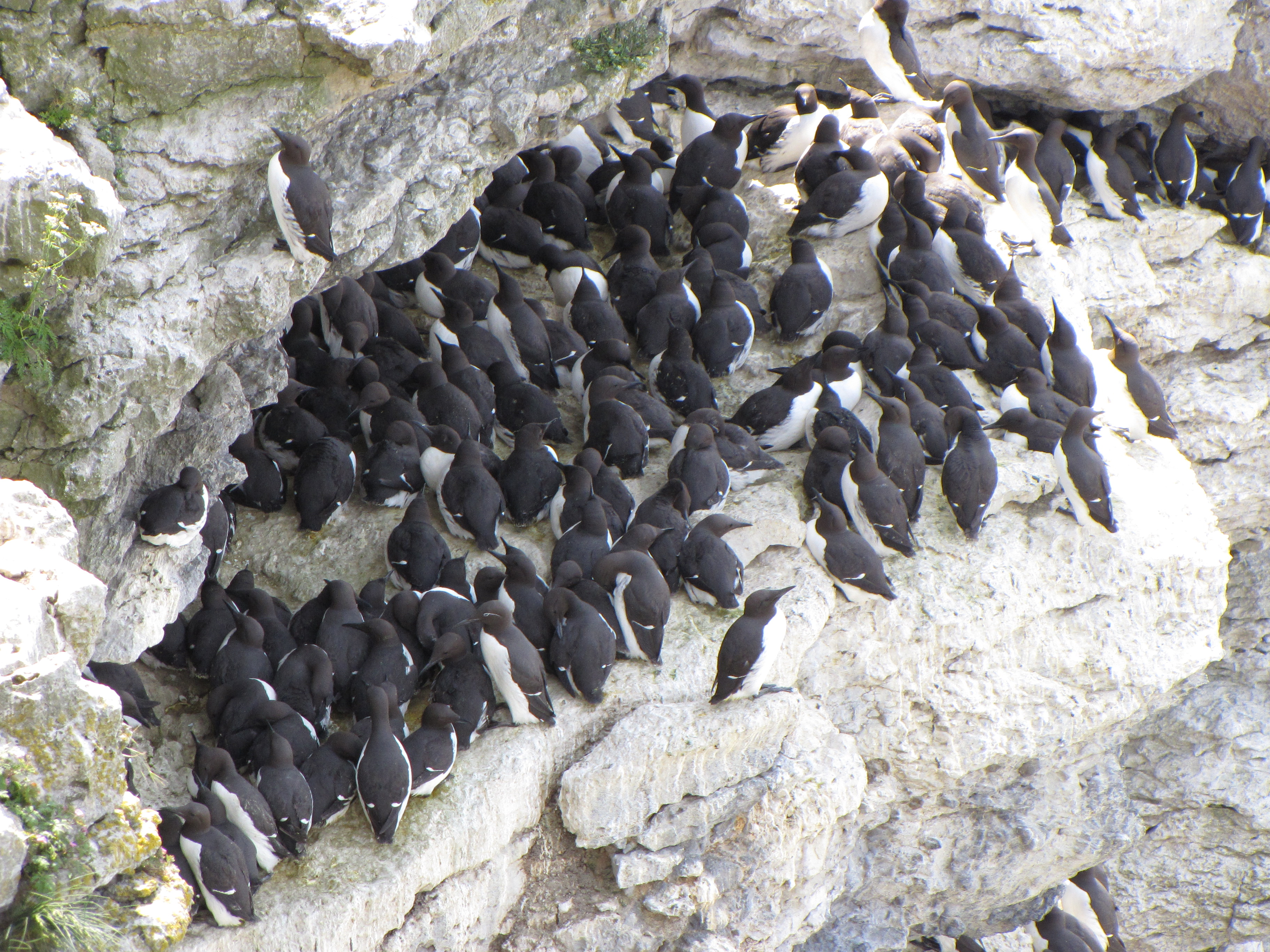
Common murres, Stora Karlsö

== Terns and gulls ==
Order: Charadriiformes Family: Laridae

Laridae is a family of seabirds and includes terns and gulls. Terns are a group of generally medium to small seabirds typically with grey or white plumage, often with black markings on the head. Most terns hunt fish by diving but some pick insects off the surface of fresh water. Gulls are medium to large seabirds, typically grey or white, often with black markings on the head or wingtips. They have stout bills and webbed feet, and are omnivorous scavengers as well as fish eaters. Both are generally long-lived birds, with several species known to live in excess of 30 years.

- Sooty tern (sottärna) Onychoprion fuscatus (R)
- Bridled tern (tygeltärna) Onychoprion anaethetus (R)
- Little tern (småtärna) Sternula albifrons (B)
- Caspian tern (skräntärna) Hydroprogne caspia (B)
- Gull-billed tern (sandtärna) Gelochelidon nilotica (O)
- Whiskered tern (skäggtärna) Chlidonias hybrida (R)
- White-winged tern (vitvingad tärna) Chlidonias leucopterus (O)
- Black tern (svarttärna) Chlidonias niger (B)
- Sandwich tern (kentsk tärna) Thalasseus sandvicensis (B)
- Forster's tern (kärrtärna) Sterna forsteri (R)
- Arctic tern (silvertärna) Sterna paradisaea (B)
- Common tern (fisktärna) Sterna hirundo (B)
- Roseate tern (rosentärna) Sterna dougallii (R)
- Little gull (dvärgmås) Hydrocoloeus minutus (B)
- Ross's gull (rosenmås) Rhodostethia rosea (R)
- Black-legged kittiwake (tretåig mås) Rissa tridactyla (B)
- Sabine's gull (tärnmås) Xema sabini (O)
- Ivory gull (ismås) Pagophila eburnea (R)
- Slender-billed gull (långnäbbad mås) Chroicocephalus genei (R)
- Bonaparte's gull (trädmås) Chroicocephalus philadelphia (R)
- Black-headed gull (skrattmås) Chroicocephalus ridibundus (B)
- Laughing gull (sotvingad mås) Leucophaeus atricilla (R)
- Franklin's gull (präriemås) Leucophaeus pipixcan (R)
- Pallas's gull (svarthuvad trut) Ichthyaetus ichthyaetus (R)
- Mediterranean gull (svarthuvad mås) Ichthyaetus melanocephalus (b)
- Ring-billed gull (ringnäbbad mås) Larus delawarensis (R)
- Common gull (fiskmås) Larus canus (B)
- Caspian gull (kaspisk trut) Larus cachinnans (O)
- European herring gull (gråtrut) Larus argentatus (B)
- Yellow-legged gull (medelhavstrut) Larus michahellis (O)
- Great black-backed gull (havstrut) Larus marinus (B)
- Glaucous gull (vittrut) Larus hyperboreus (O)
- Lesser black-backed gull (silltrut) Larus fuscus (B)
- Iceland gull (vitvingad trut) Larus glaucoides (O)
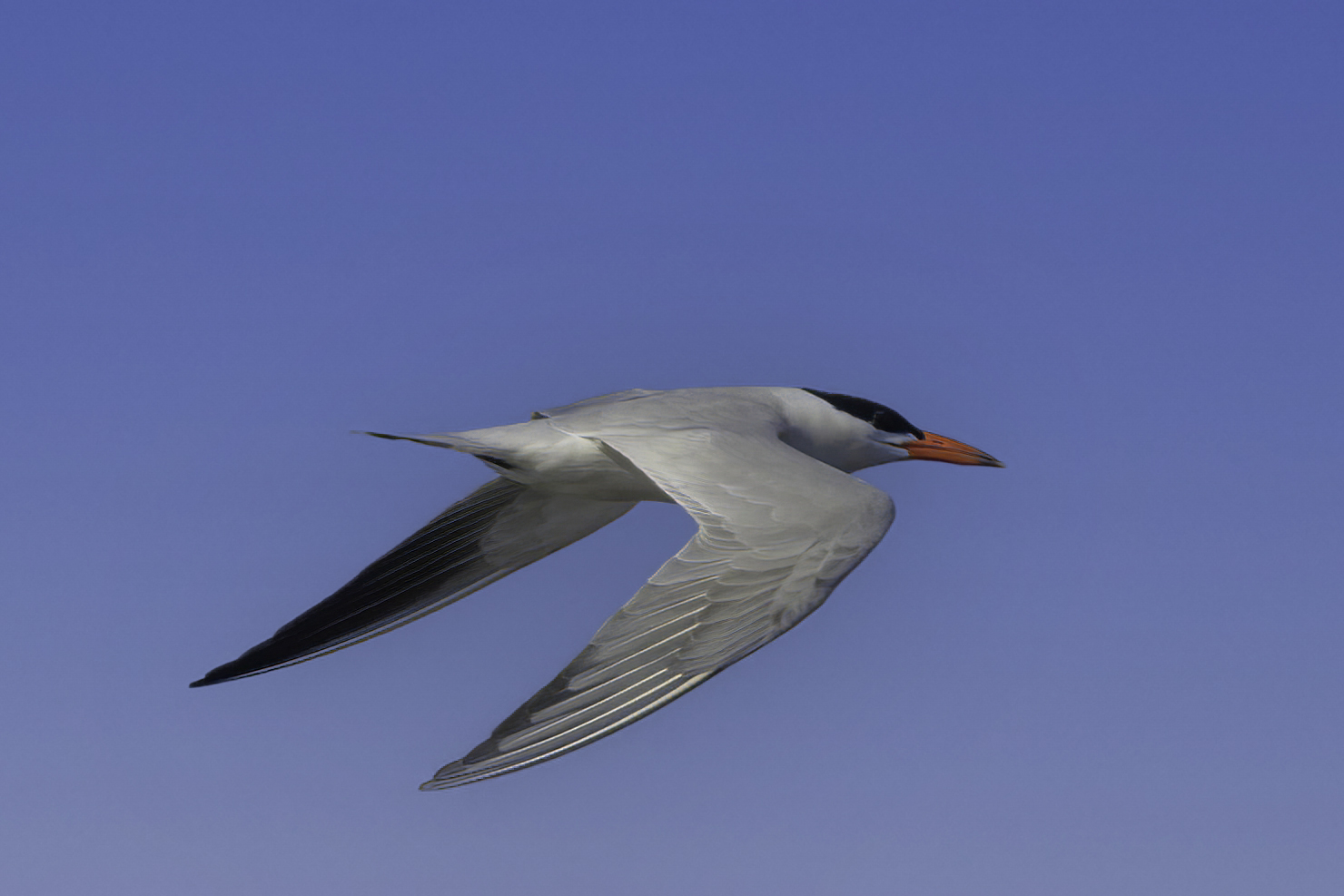
Caspian tern, Bogesund, Vaxholm, Stockholm

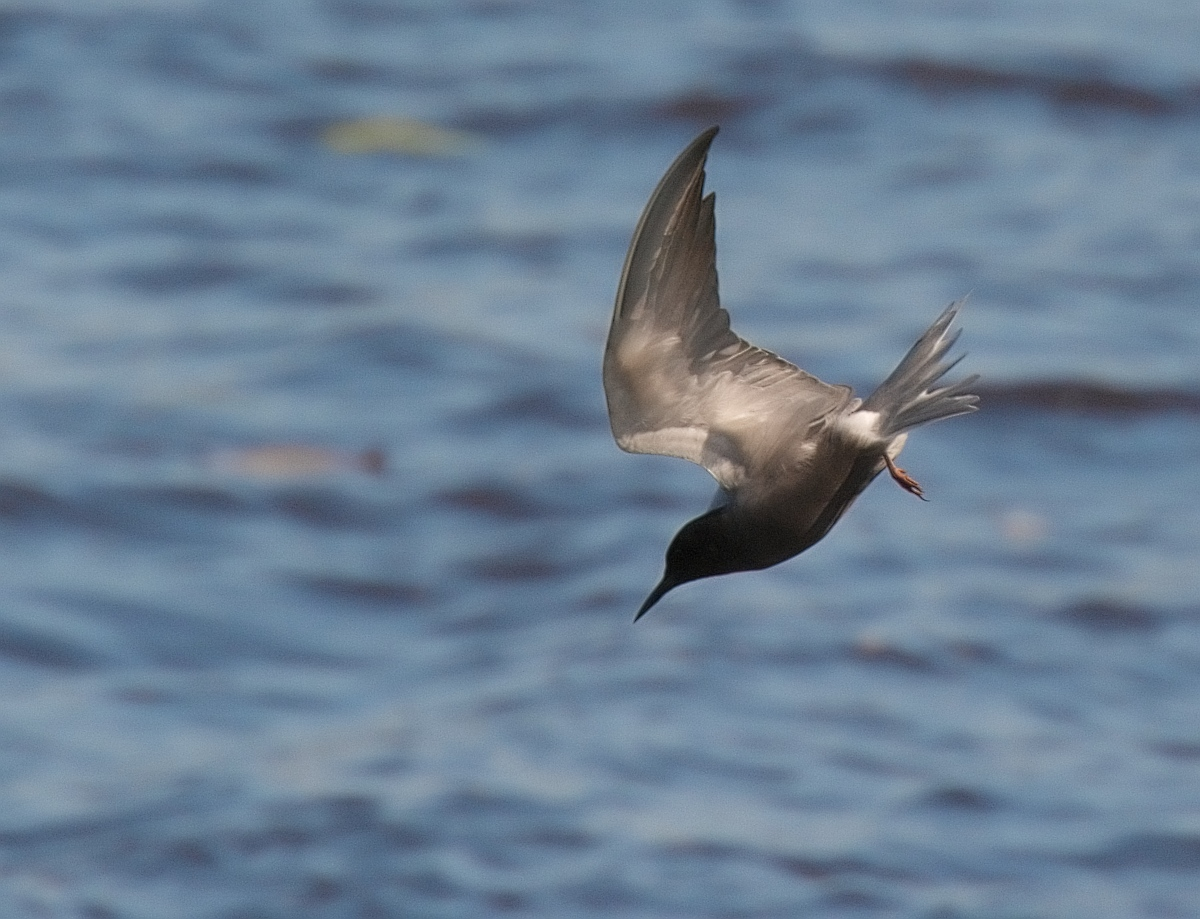
Black tern, Araslövssjön, Scania

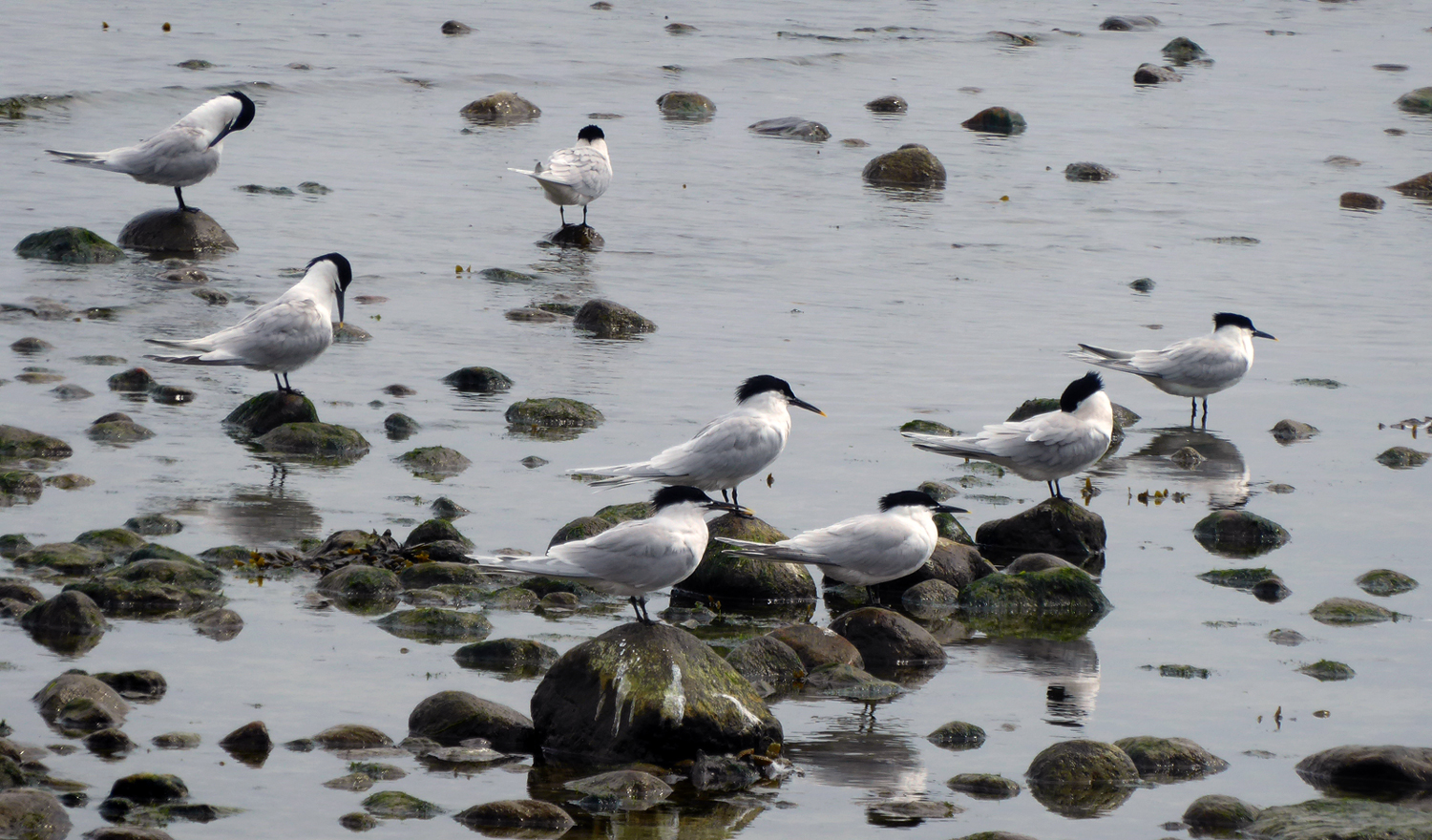
Sandwich terns, Ystad

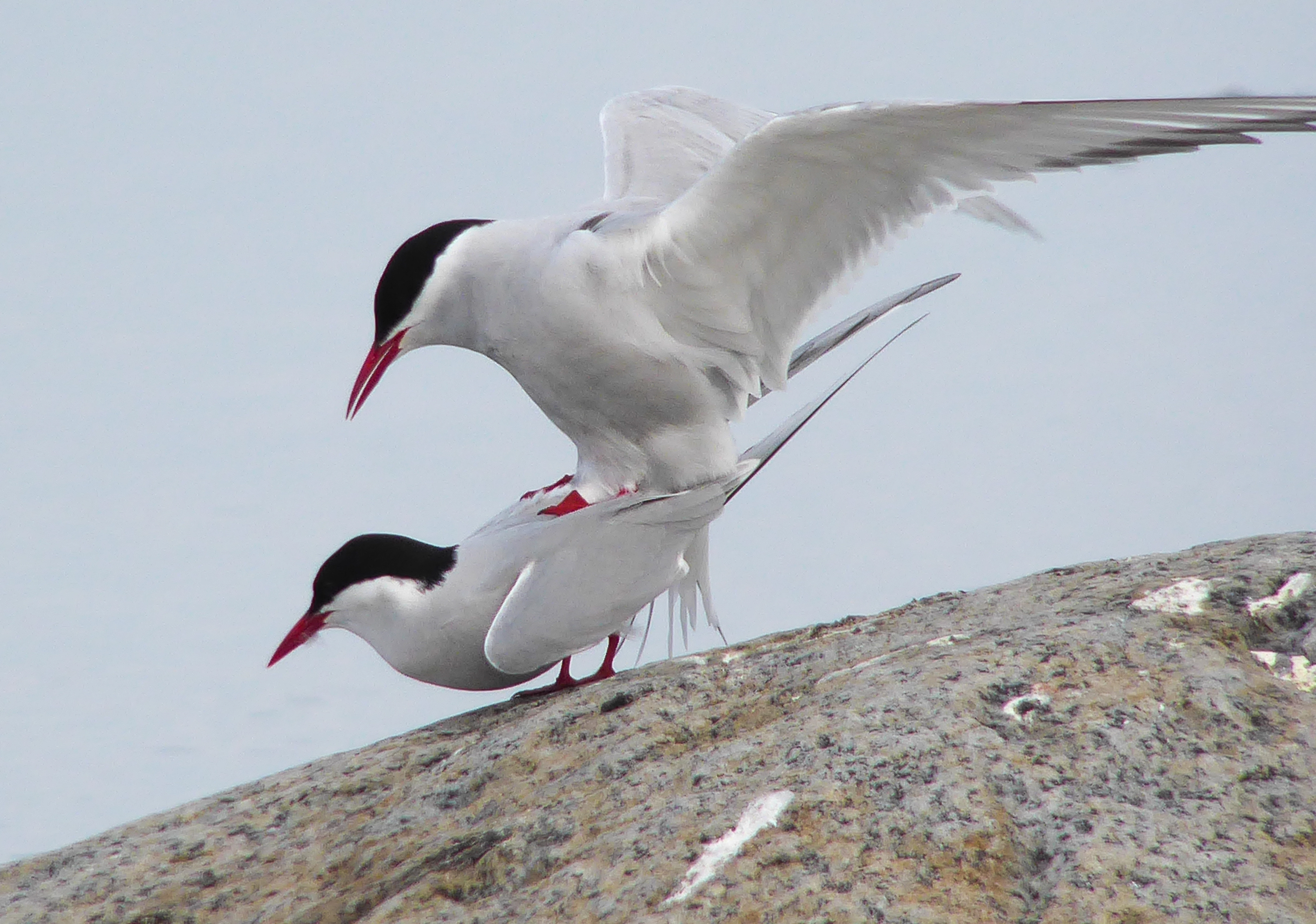
Arctic terns, Västerstadsviken, Södra Öland

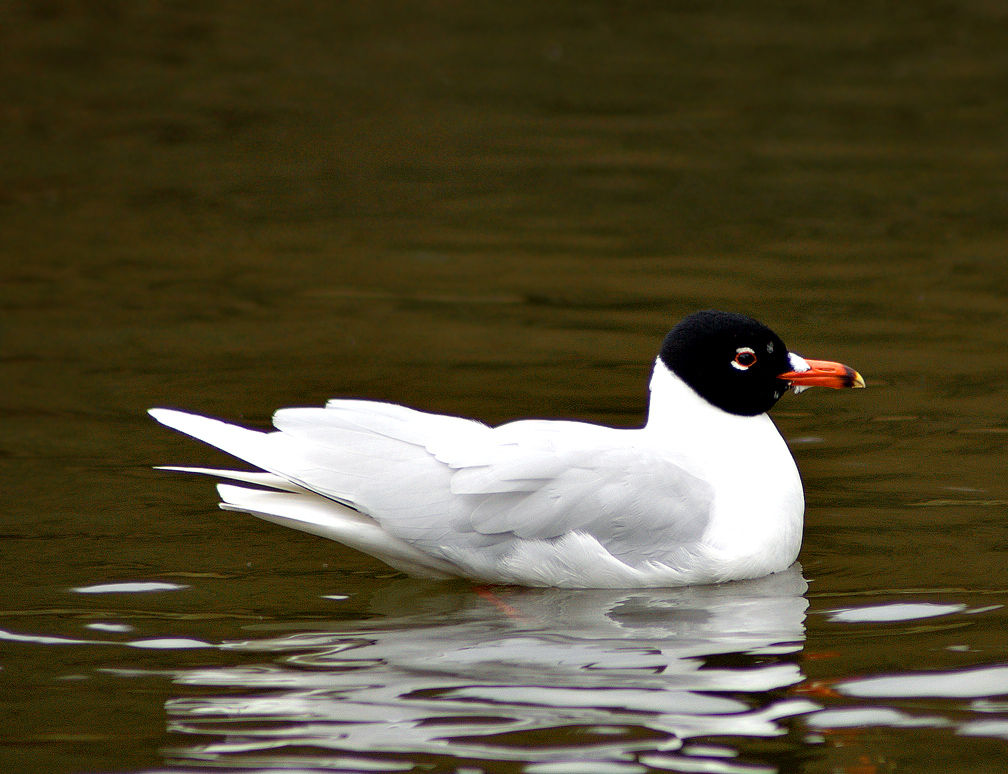
Mediterranean gull, Slottskogen, Gothenburg

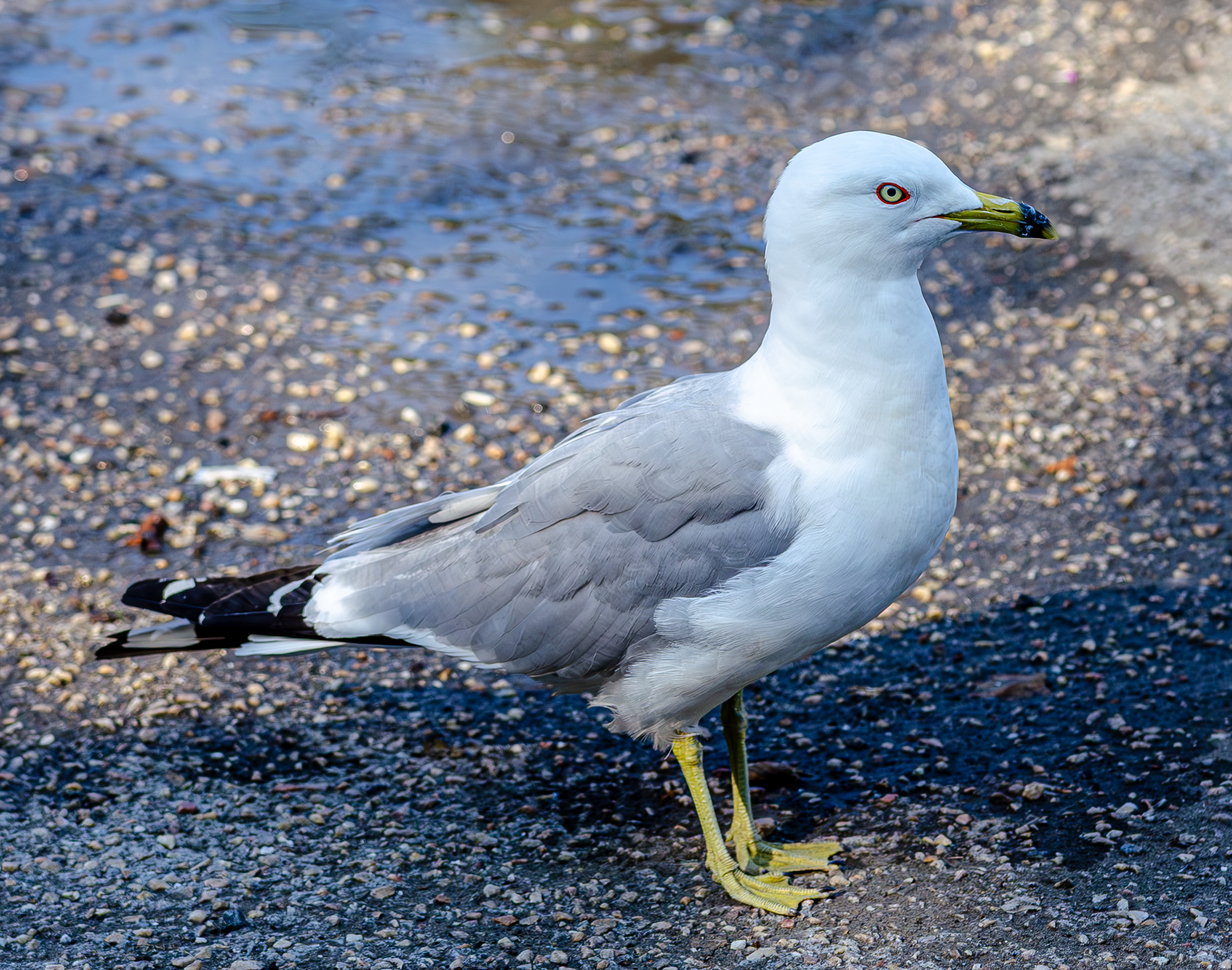
Ring-billed gull, Kungsträdgården, Stockholm

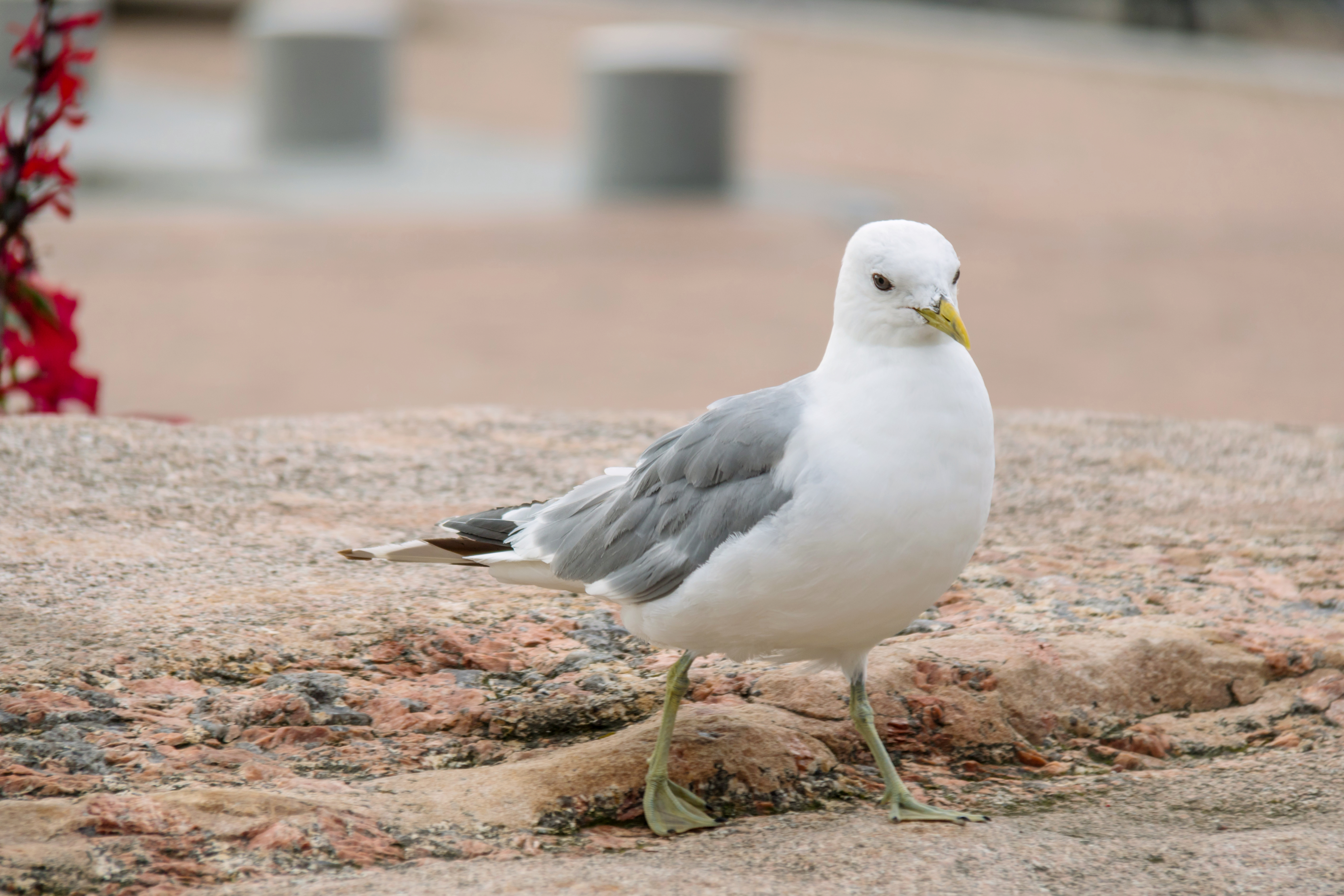
Common gull, Västra hamnen, Malmö

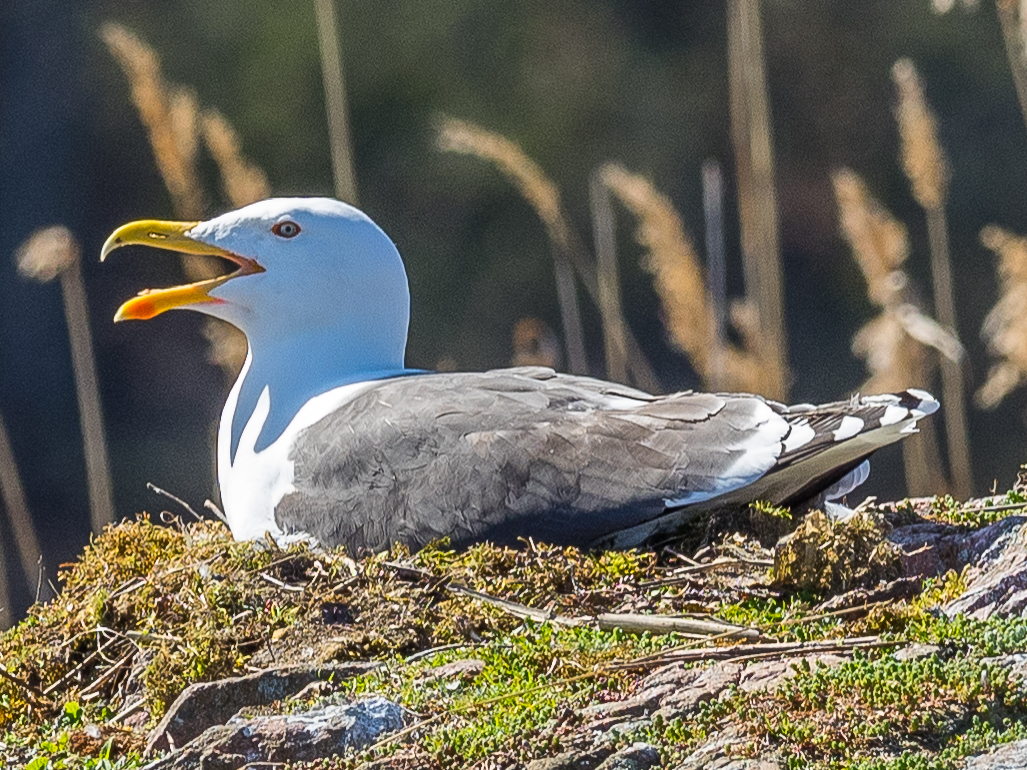
Great black-backed gull, around Vaxholm

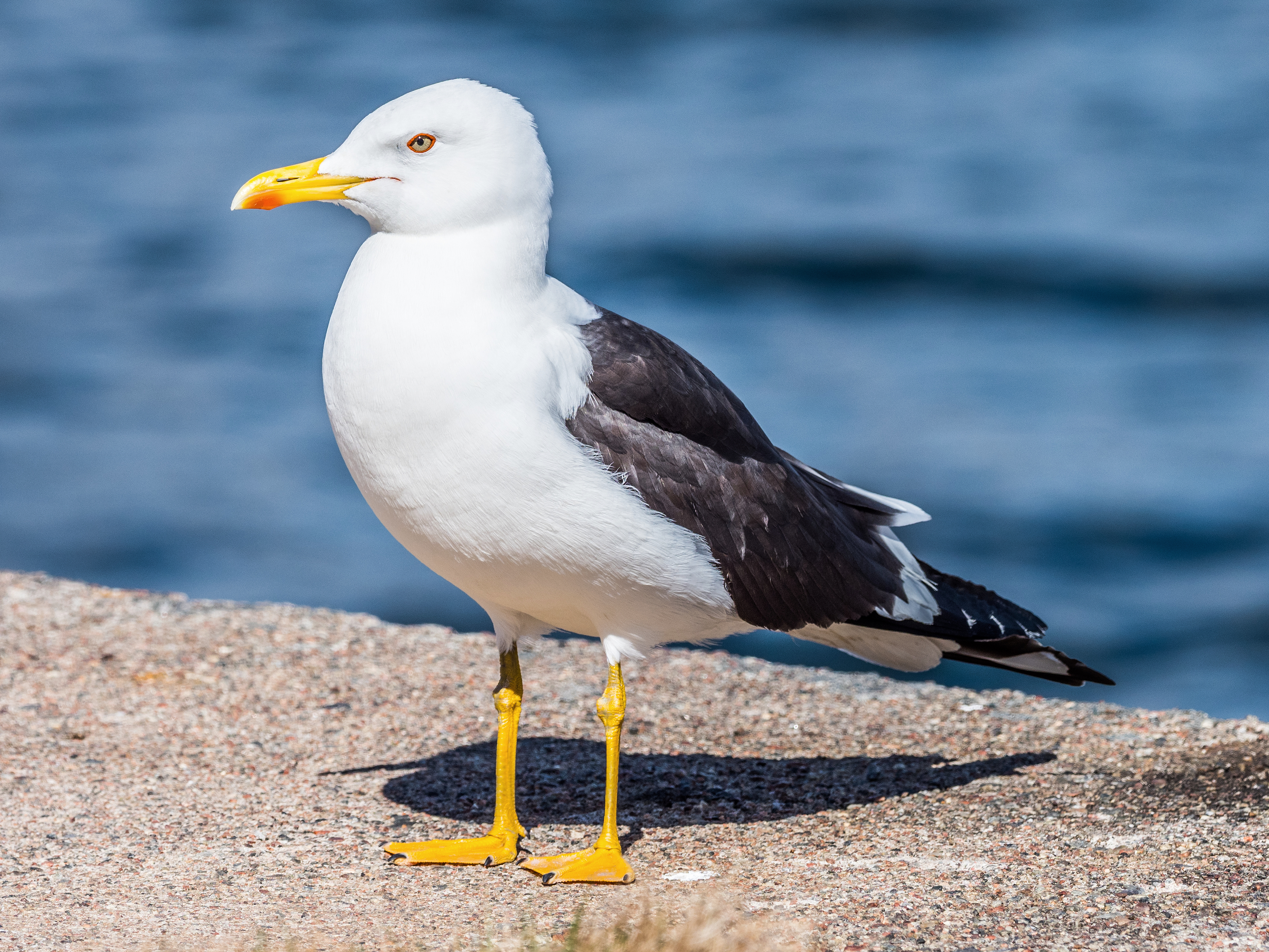
Lesser black-backed gull, Vaxholm, Stockholm

== Divers or loons ==
Order: Gaviiformes Family: Gaviidae

Divers or loons are a group of aquatic birds found in many parts of North America and Northern Eurasia. They are the size of a large duck or cormorant, which they somewhat resemble in shape when swimming, but to which they are only very distantly related. In particular, their legs are set very far back which assists swimming underwater but makes walking on land extremely difficult.

- Red-throated loon (smålom) Gavia stellata (B)
- Common loon (svartnäbbad islom) Gavia immer (O)
- Yellow-billed loon (vitnäbbad islom) Gavia adamsii (O)
- Pacific loon (stillahavslom) Gavia pacifica (R)
- Black-throated loon (storlom) Gavia arctica (B)
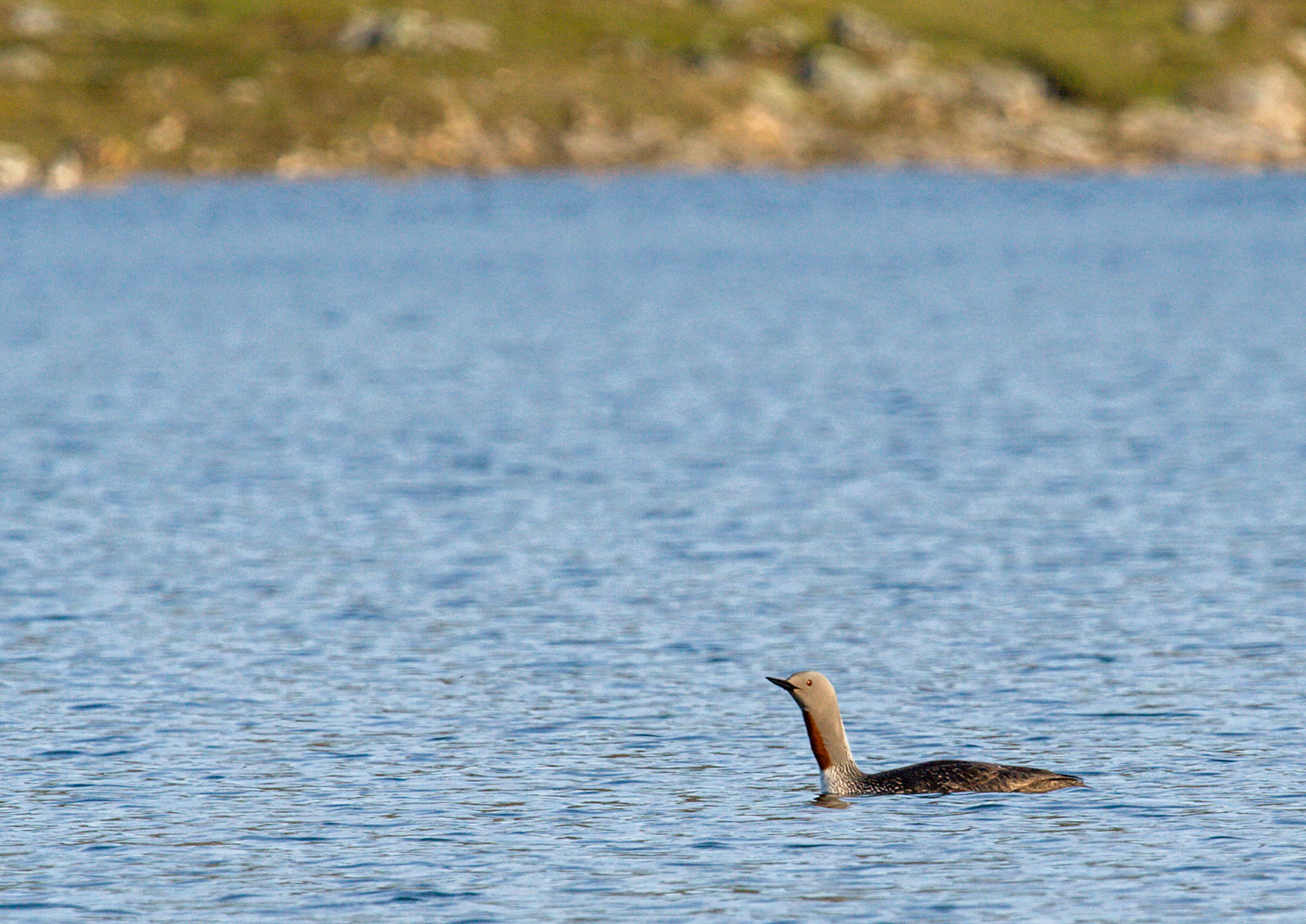
Red-throated loon, Jokkmokk Municipality, Lapland

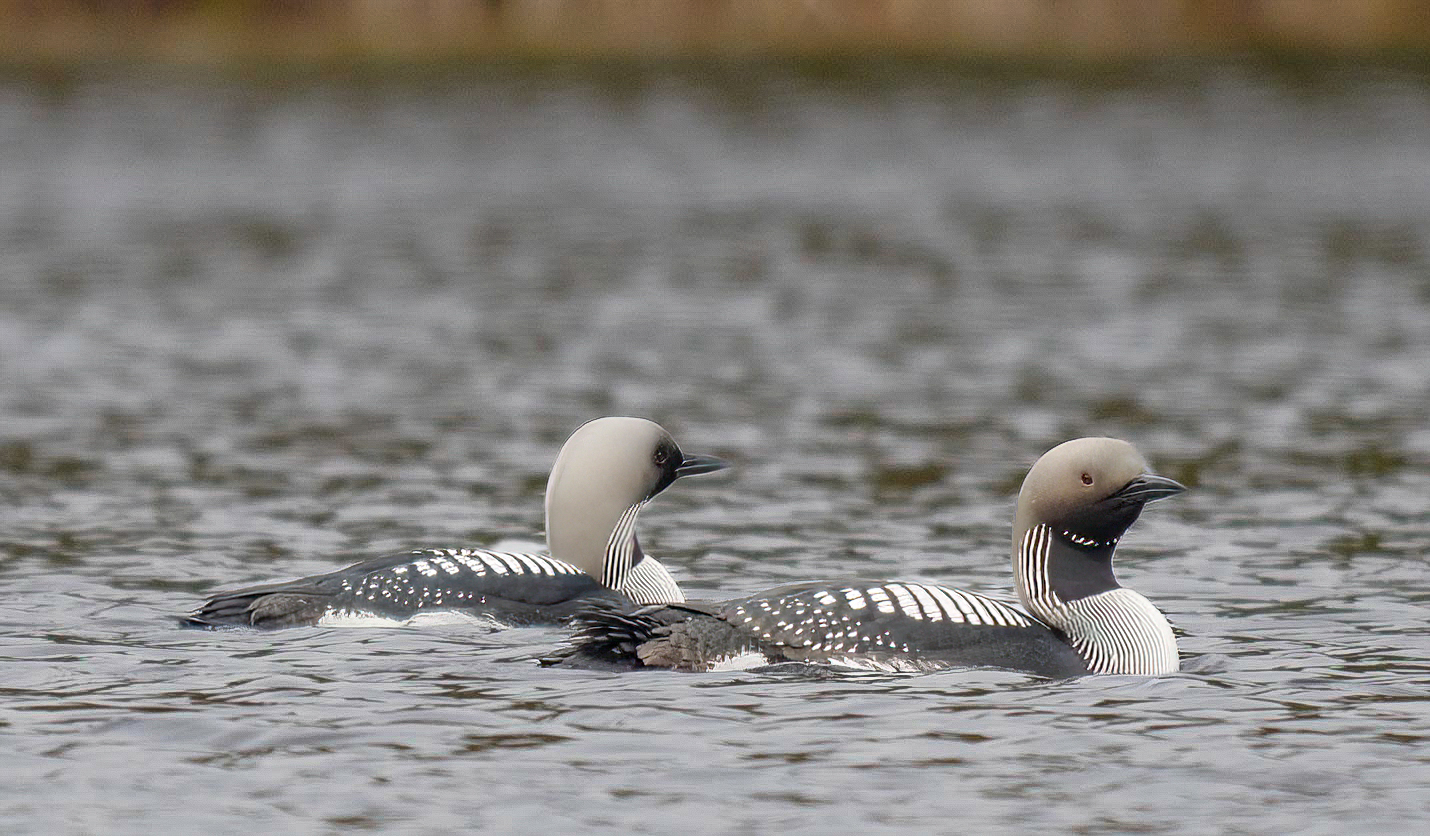
Black-throated loons, Bogesund, Vaxholm, Stockholm

== Albatrosses ==
Order: Procellariiformes Family: Diomedeidae

The albatrosses are among the largest of flying birds, and the great albatrosses of the genus Diomedea have the largest wingspans of any extant birds.

- Atlantic yellow-nosed albatross (mindre albatross) Thalassarche chlororhynchos (R)
- Black-browed albatross (svartbrynad albatross) Thalassarche melanophris (R)

== Northern storm petrels ==
Order: Procellariiformes Family: Hydrobatidae

Though the members of this family are similar in many respects to the southern storm petrels, including their general appearance and habits, there are enough genetic differences to warrant their placement in a separate family.

- European storm petrel (stormsvala) Hydrobates pelagicus (O)
- Leach's storm petrel (klykstjärtad stormsvala) Hydrobates leucorhous (O)

== Shearwaters and petrels ==
Order: Procellariiformes Family: Procellariidae

The procellariids are the main group of medium-sized "true petrels", characterised by united nostrils with medium septum and a long outer functional primaries.

- Northern fulmar (stormfågel) Fulmarus glacialis (O)
- Scopoli's shearwater (diomedeslira) Calonectris diomedea (R)
- Cory's shearwater (gulnäbbad lira) Calonectris borealis (R)
- Sooty shearwater (grålira) Ardenna grisea (O)
- Great shearwater (större lira) Ardenna gravis (R)
- Manx shearwater (mindre lira) Puffinus puffinus (O)
- Mediterranean shearwater (medelhavslira) Puffinus yelkouan (R)
  - includes Balearic shearwater (balearisk lira) Puffinus yelkouan mauretanicus (R)
- Zino's petrel / Fea's petrel / Desertas petrel (madeirapetrell / kapverdepetrell / desertaspetrell) Pterodroma madeira / feae / deserta (R)

== Storks ==
Order: Ciconiiformes Family: Ciconiidae

Storks are large, long-legged, long-necked, wetland birds with long, stout bills. Storks are mute, but bill-clattering is an important mode of communication at the nest. Their nests can be large and may be reused for many years. Many species are migratory.

- Black stork (svart stork) Ciconia nigra (b)
- White stork (vit stork) Ciconia ciconia (B)
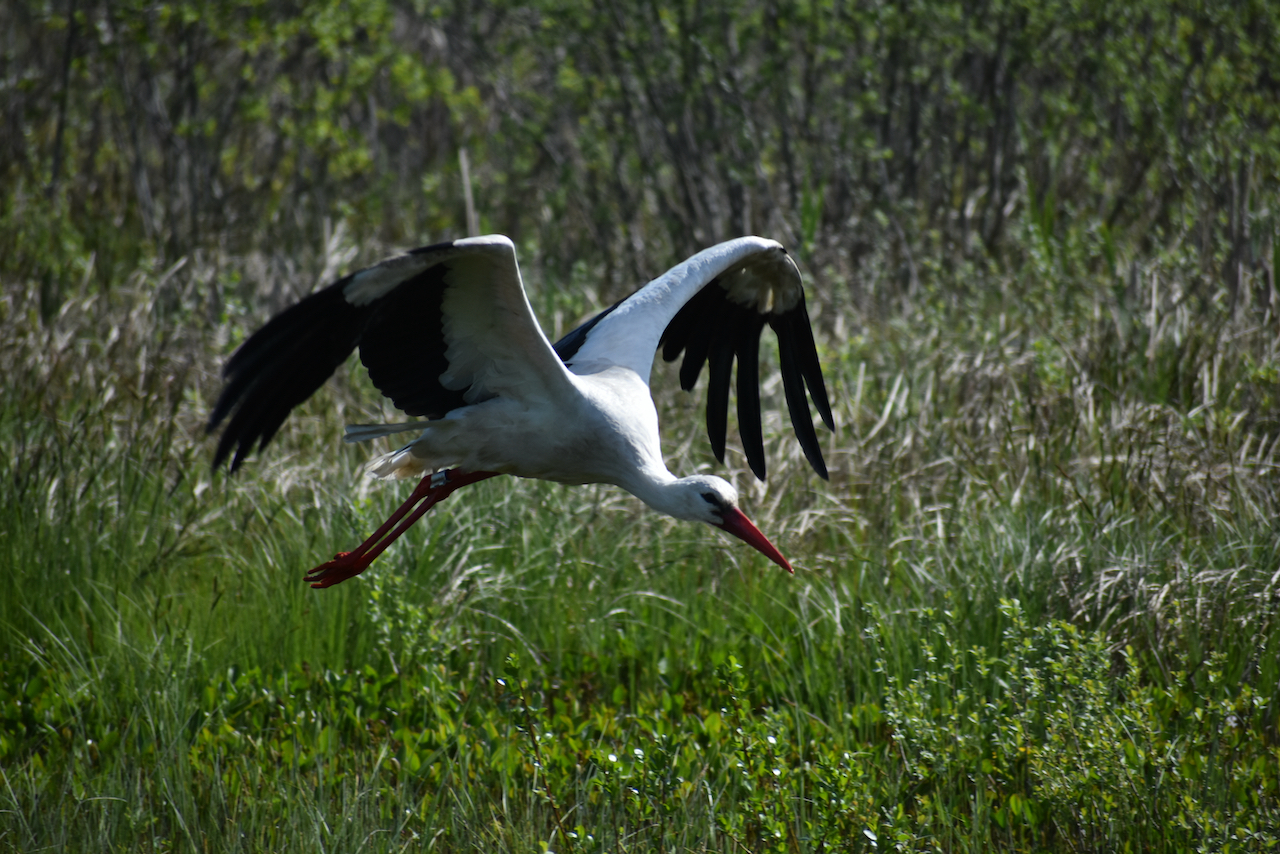
White stork, Risens naturreservat, Lund, Scania

== Frigatebirds ==
Order: Suliformes Family: Fregatidae

Frigatebirds are large, highly aerial tropical seabirds which feed mainly by stealing food from other seabirds, or catching flying fish in flight. They only occur as extreme vagrants in northern latitudes.

- Unidentified Fregata sp. (fregattfågel) Fregata (sp.) (R)

== Boobies and gannets ==
Order: Suliformes Family: Sulidae

The sulids comprise the gannets and boobies. Both groups are medium-large coastal seabirds that plunge-dive for fish.

- Northern gannet (havssula) Morus bassanus (M)
- Brown booby (brunsula) Sula leucogaster (R)
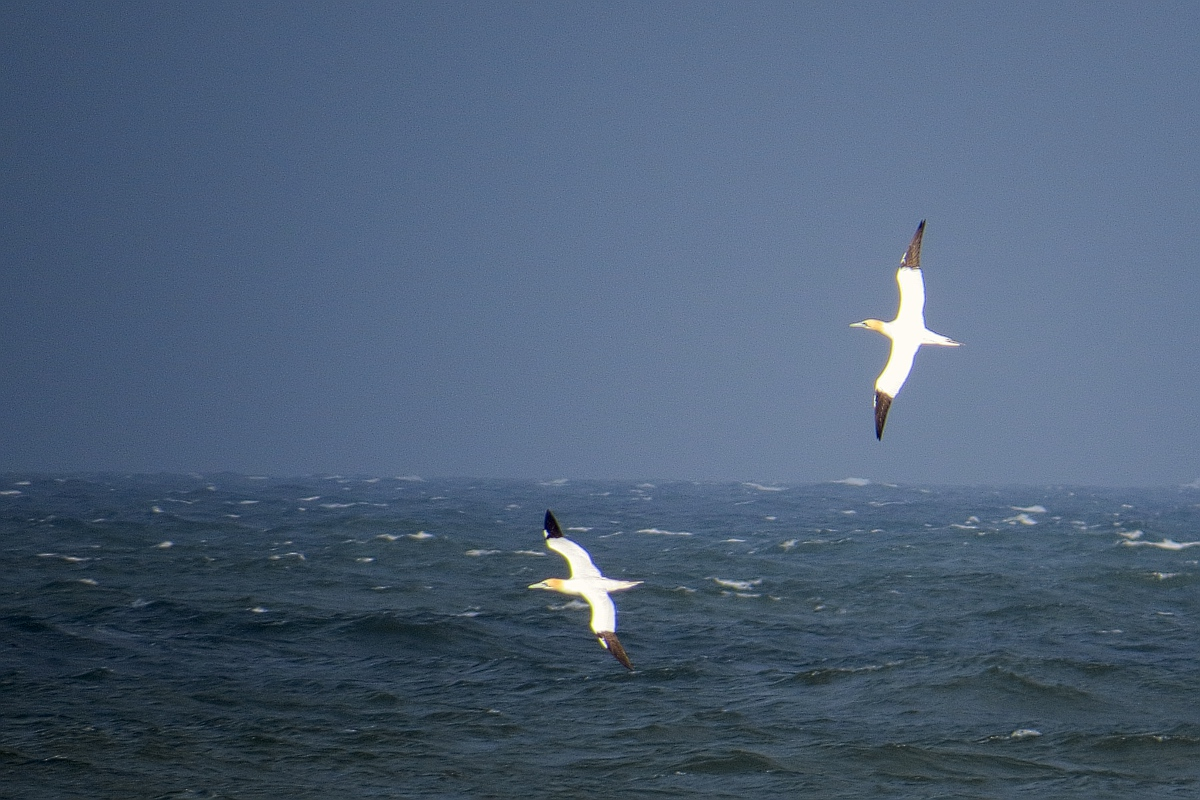
Northern gannets, off Falkenberg, Halland

== Cormorants and shags ==
Order: Suliformes Family: Phalacrocoracidae

Cormorants and shags are medium to large aquatic birds, usually with mainly dark plumage and areas of yellow or red skin on the face. The bill is long, thin and sharply hooked. Their feet are four-toed and webbed between all four toes.

- Pygmy cormorant (dvärgskarv) Microcarbo pygmeus (R)
- European shag (toppskarv) Gulosus aristotelis (B)
- Great cormorant (storskarv) Phalacrocorax carbo (B)
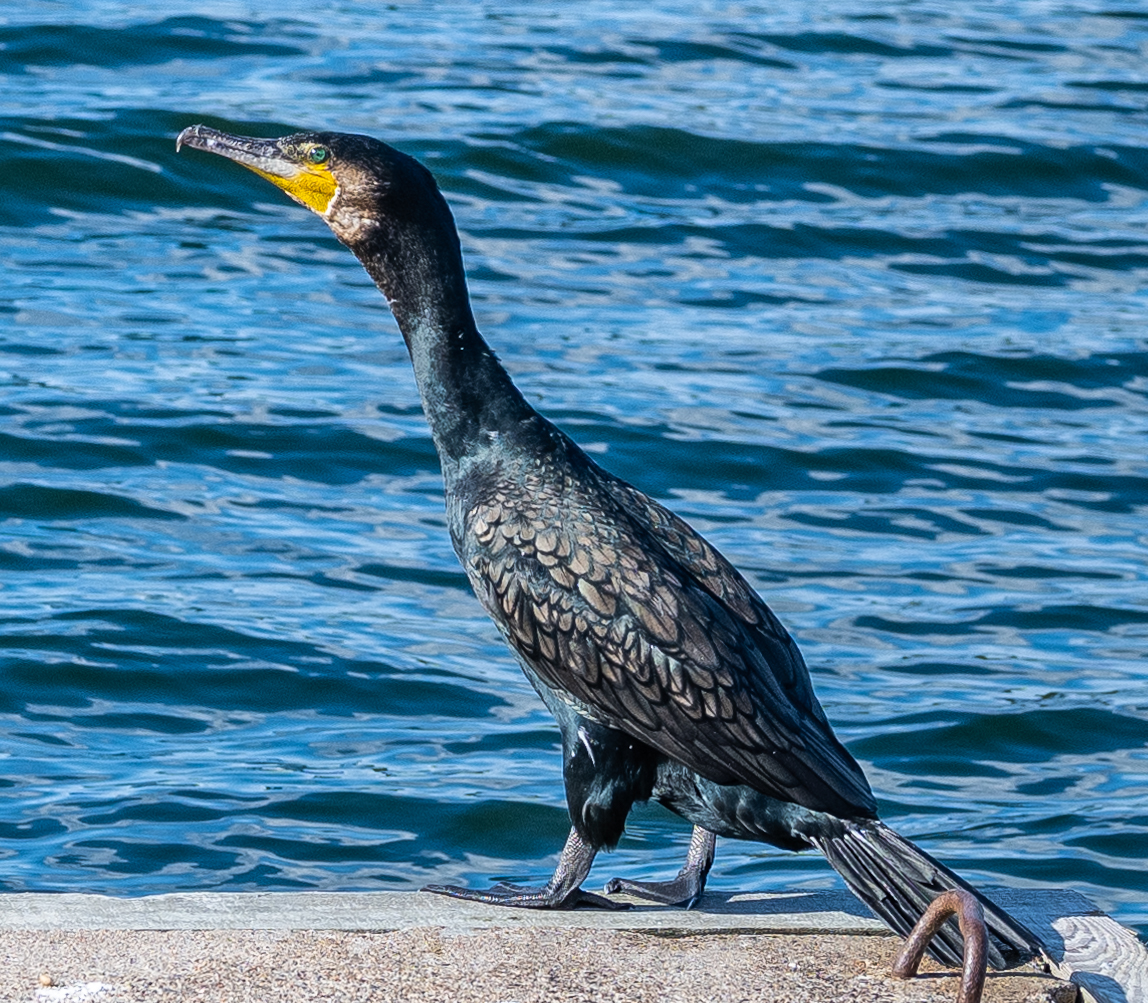
Great cormorant, Vaxholm, Stockholm

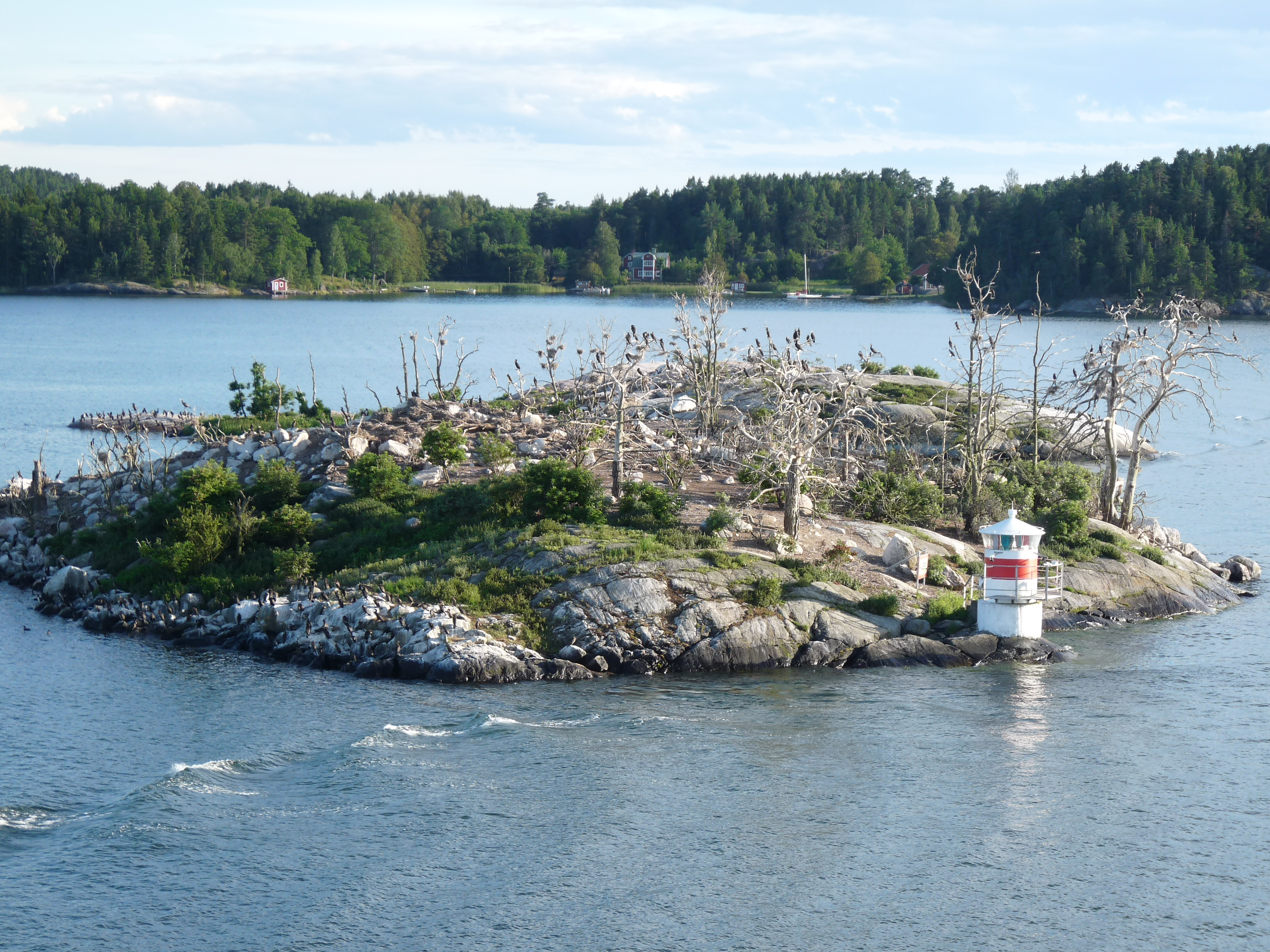
Great cormorant, breeding colony, off Stockholm

== Ibises and spoonbills ==
Order: Pelecaniformes Family: Threskiornithidae

The family Threskiornithidae includes the ibises and spoonbills. They have long, broad wings. Their bodies tend to be elongated, the neck more so, with rather long legs. The bill is also long, decurved in the case of the ibises, straight and distinctively flattened in the spoonbills.

- Glossy ibis (bronsibis) Plegadis falcinellus (R)
- Eurasian spoonbill (skedstork) Platalea leucorodia (O)

== Herons, egrets, and bitterns ==
Order: Pelecaniformes Family: Ardeidae

The family Ardeidae contains the herons, egrets, and bitterns. Herons and egrets are medium to large wetland birds with long necks and legs. Bitterns tend to be shorter necked and more secretive. Members of Ardeidae fly with their necks retracted, unlike other long-necked birds such as storks, ibises and spoonbills.

- Eurasian bittern (rördrom) Botaurus stellaris (B)
- American bittern (amerikansk rördrom) Botaurus lentiginosus (R)
- Little bittern (dvärgrördrom) Botaurus minutus (R)
- Little egret (silkeshäger) Egretta garzetta (O)
- Black-crowned night heron (natthäger) Nycticorax nycticorax (R)
- Squacco heron (rallhäger) Ardeola ralloides (R)
- Great egret (ägretthäger) Ardea alba (B)
- Western cattle egret (kohäger) Ardea ibis (R)
- Purple heron (purpurhäger) Ardea purpurea (R)
- Grey heron (gråhäger) Ardea cinerea (B)
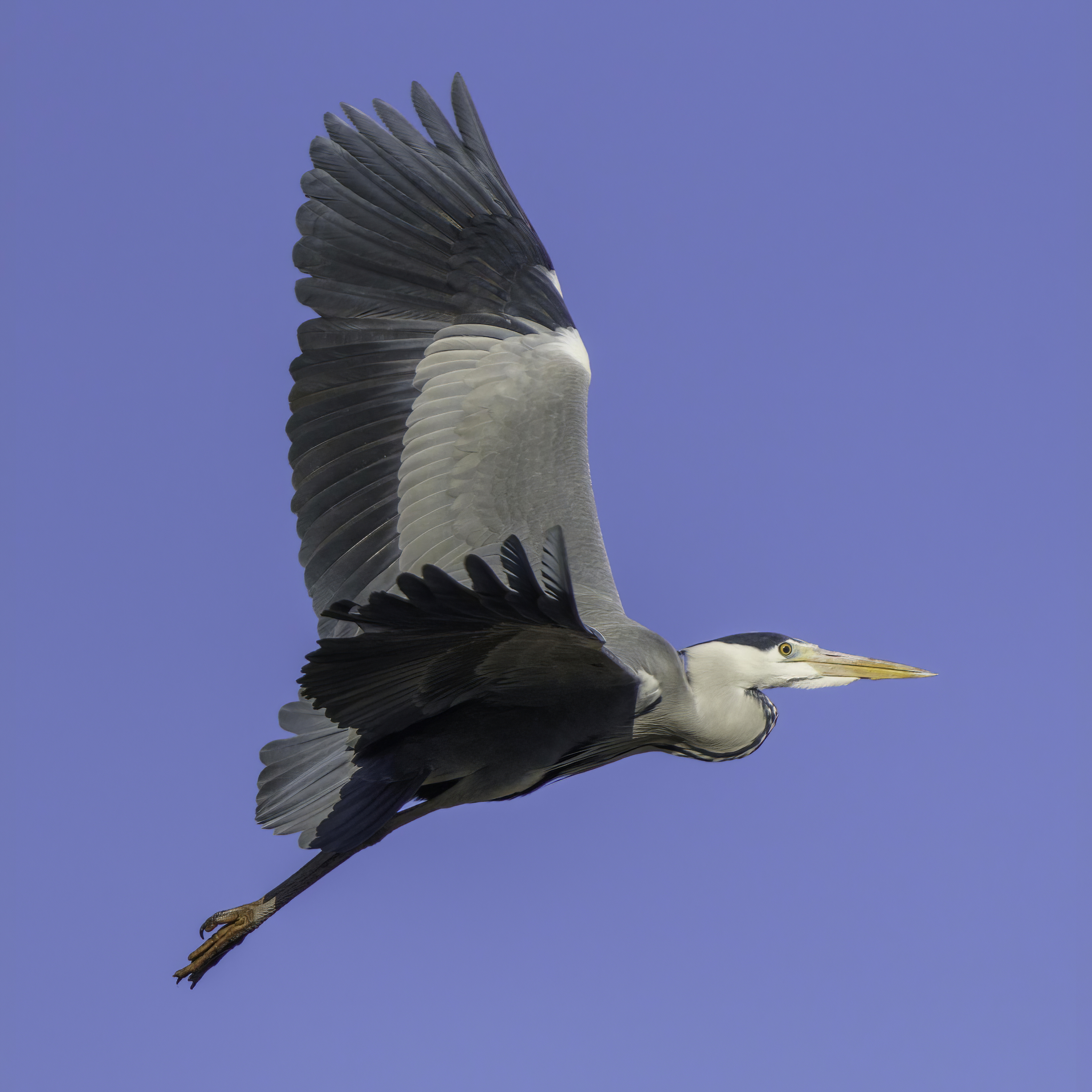
Grey heron, Djurgården, Stockholm

== Nightjars and allies ==
Order: Caprimulgiformes Family: Caprimulgidae

Nightjars are medium-sized nocturnal birds that usually nest on the ground. They have long wings, short legs, and very short bills. Most have small feet, of little use for walking, and long pointed wings. Their soft plumage is camouflaged to resemble bark or leaves.

- European nightjar (nattskärra) Caprimulgus europaeus (B)
- Egyptian nightjar (ökennattskärra) Caprimulgus aegyptius (R)
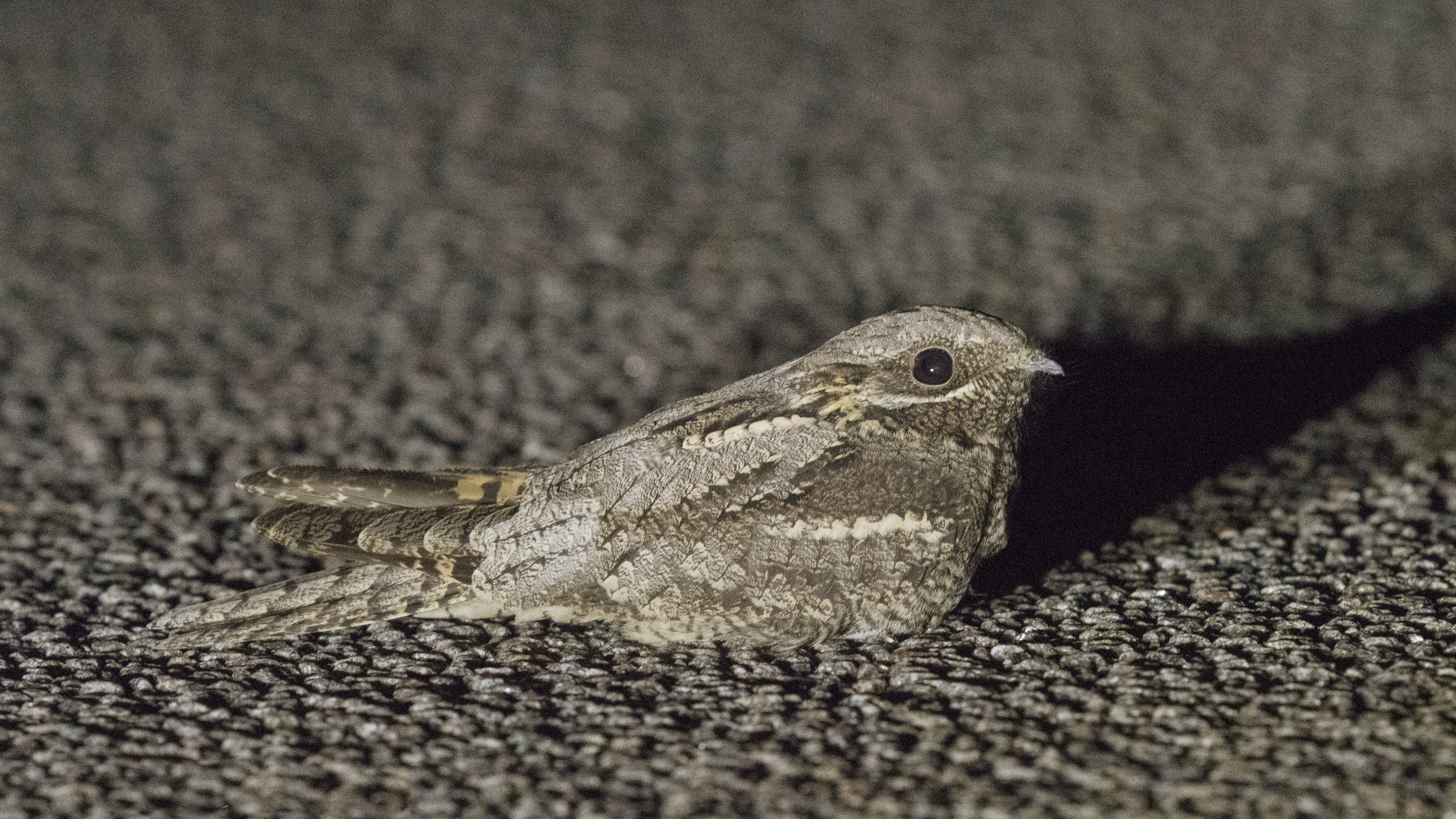
European nightjar, Tingstäde, Gotland

== Swifts ==
Order: Caprimulgiformes Family: Apodidae

Swifts are small birds which spend the majority of their lives flying. These birds have very short legs and never settle voluntarily on the ground, perching instead only on vertical surfaces. Many swifts have long swept-back wings which resemble a crescent or boomerang.

- White-throated needletail (taggstjärtseglare) Hirundapus caudacutus (R)
- Chimney swift (skorstenseglare) Chaetura pelagica (R)
- Alpine swift (alpseglare) Tachymarptis melba (R)
- Fork-tailed swift (orientseglare) Apus pacificus (R)
- White-rumped swift (vitgumpseglare) Apus caffer (R)
- Little swift (stubbstjärtseglare) Apus affinis (R)
- Common swift (tornseglare) Apus apus (B)
- Pallid swift (blek tornseglare) Apus pallidus (R)
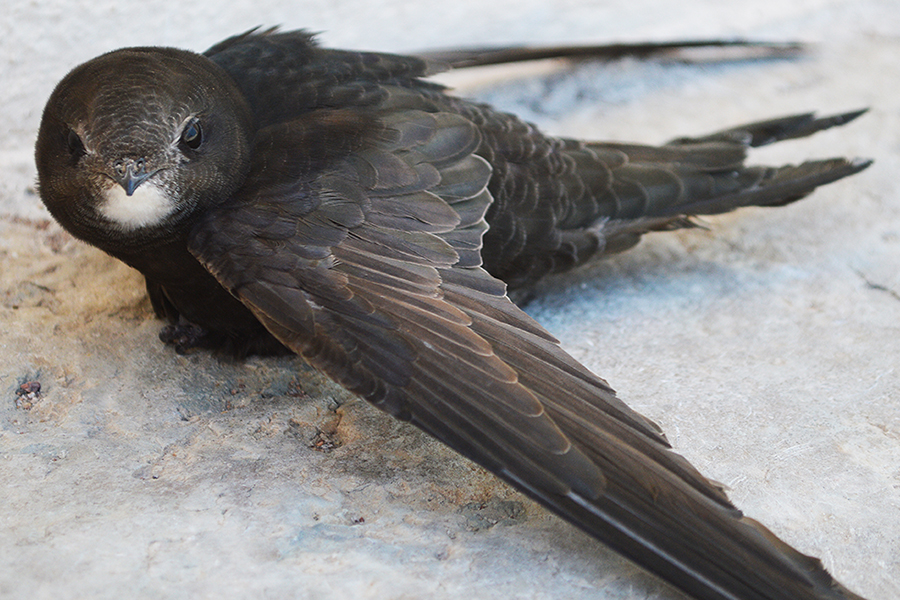
Common swift, Kalmar Castle

== Barn owls ==
Order: Strigiformes Family: Tytonidae

Barn owls are medium to large owls with large heads and characteristic heart-shaped faces. They have long strong legs with powerful talons.

- Western barn owl (tornuggla) Tyto alba (b)

== Owls ==
Order: Strigiformes Family: Strigidae

Typical owls are small to large solitary nocturnal birds of prey. They have large forward-facing eyes and ears, a hawk-like beak, and a conspicuous circle of feathers around each eye called a facial disk.

- Boreal owl (pärluggla) Aegolius funereus (B)
- Little owl (minervauggla) Athene noctua (R)
- Northern hawk-owl (hökuggla) Surnia ulula (B)
- Eurasian pygmy owl (sparvuggla) Glaucidium passerinum (B)
- Eurasian scops owl (dvärguv) Otus scops (R)
- Short-eared owl (jorduggla) Asio flammeus (B)
- Long-eared owl (hornuggla) Asio otus (B)
- Snowy owl (fjälluggla) Bubo scandiacus (b)
- Eurasian eagle-owl (berguv) Bubo bubo (B)
- Tawny owl (kattuggla) Strix aluco (B)
- Ural owl (slaguggla) Strix uralensis (B)
- Great grey owl (lappuggla) Strix nebulosa (B)
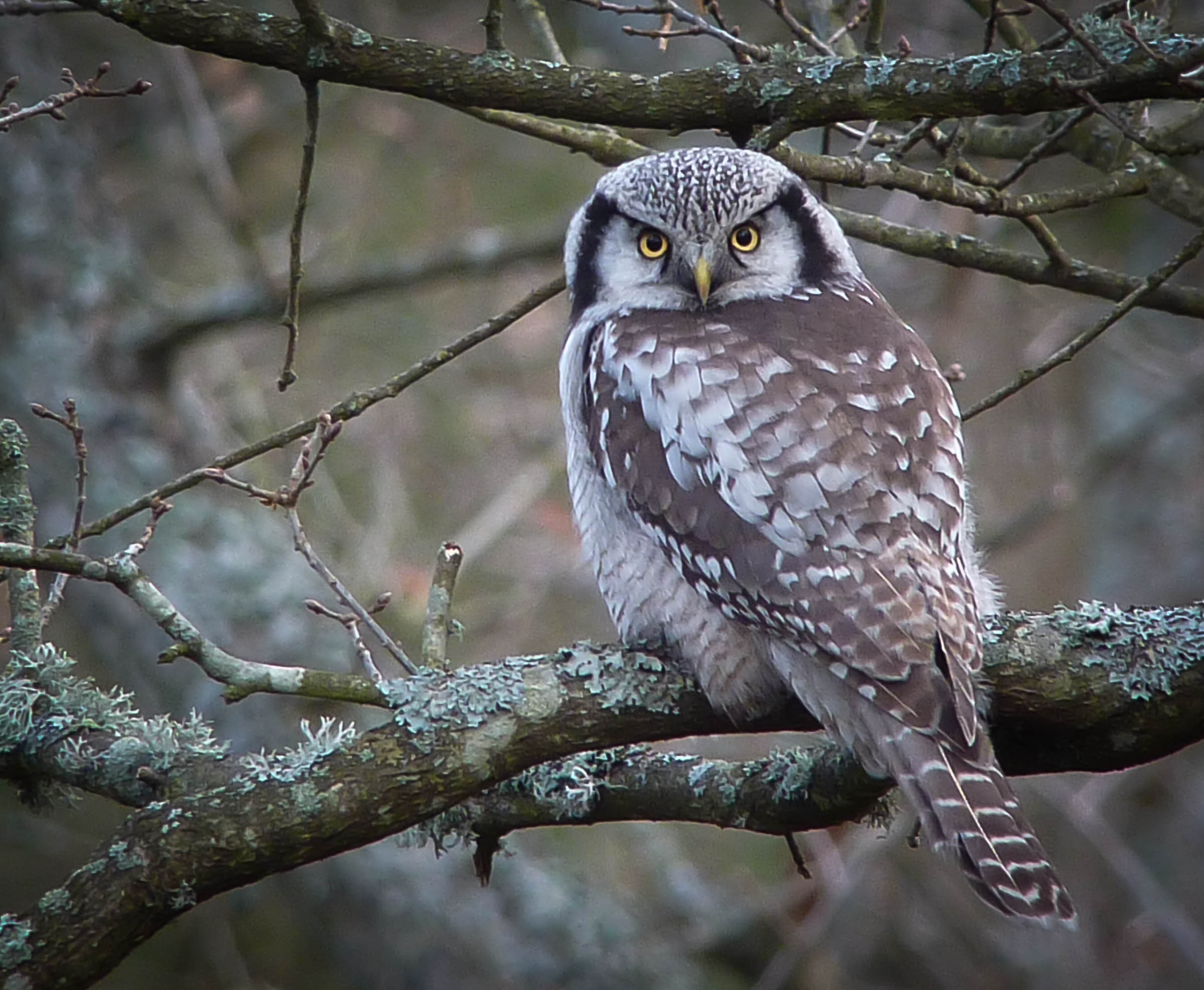
Northern hawk-owl, Rockneby, Kalmar

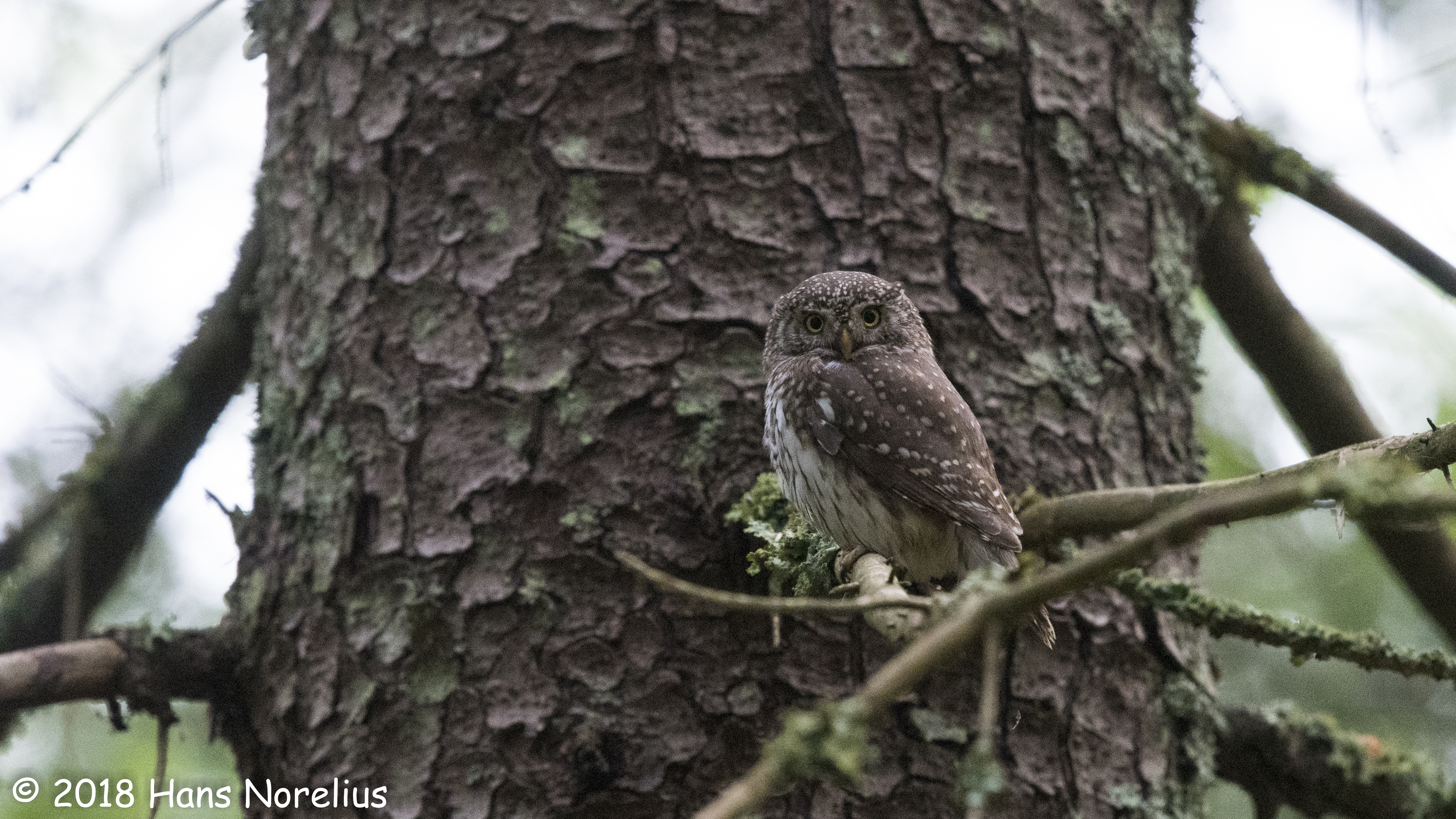
Eurasian pygmy owl, Öskevik, Västmanland

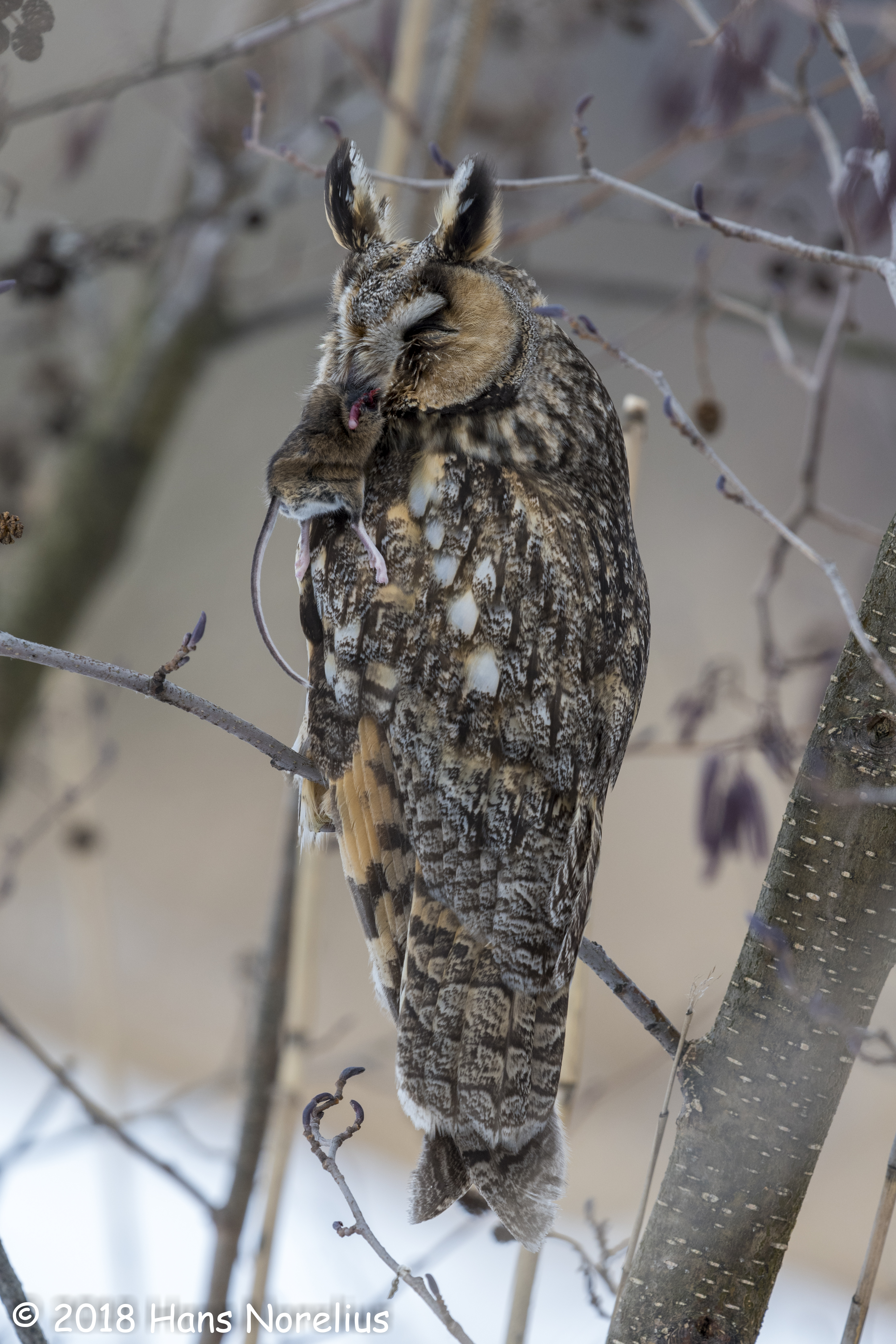
Long-eared owl, Solna, Uppland

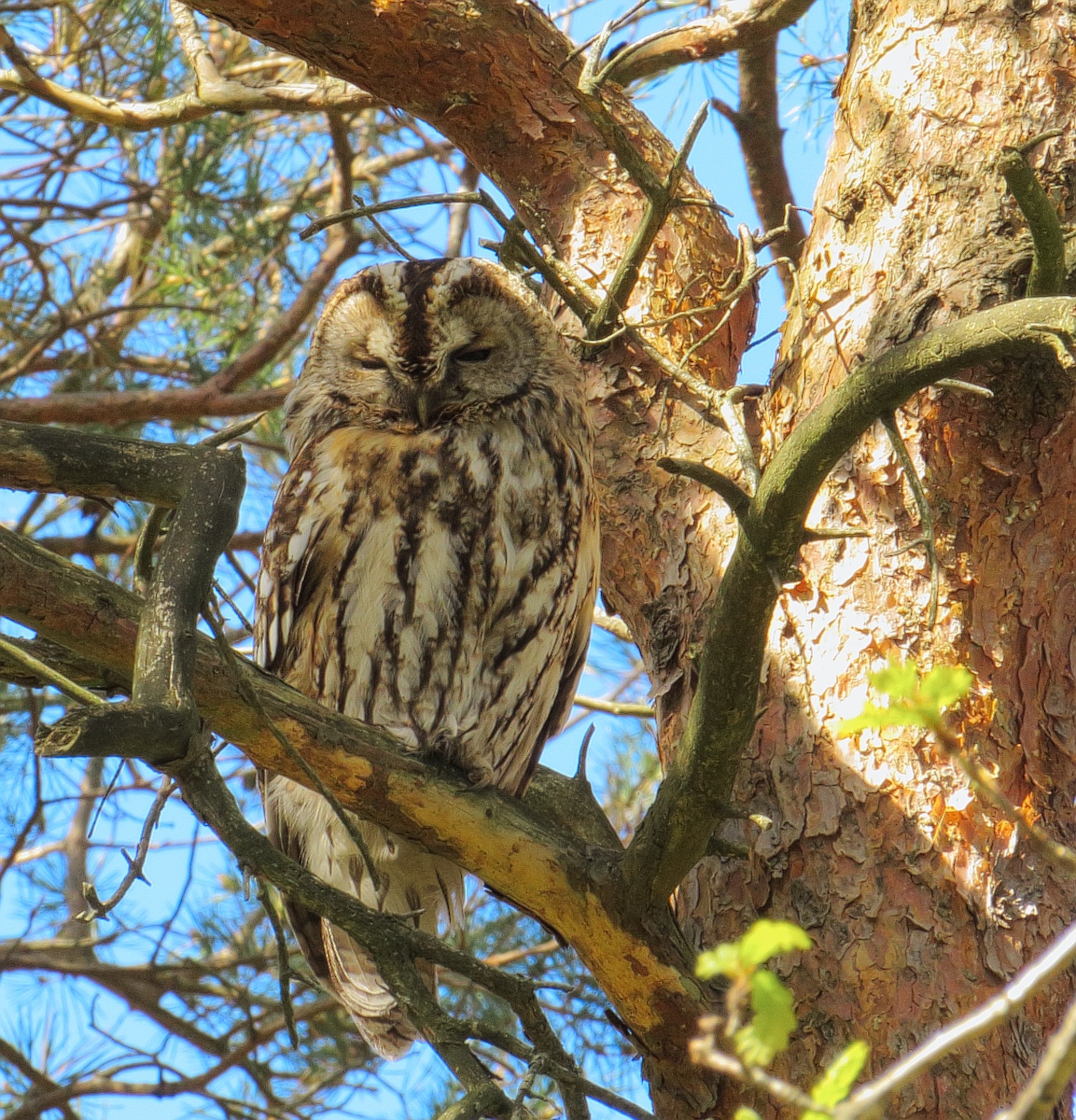
Tawny owl, Gothenburg

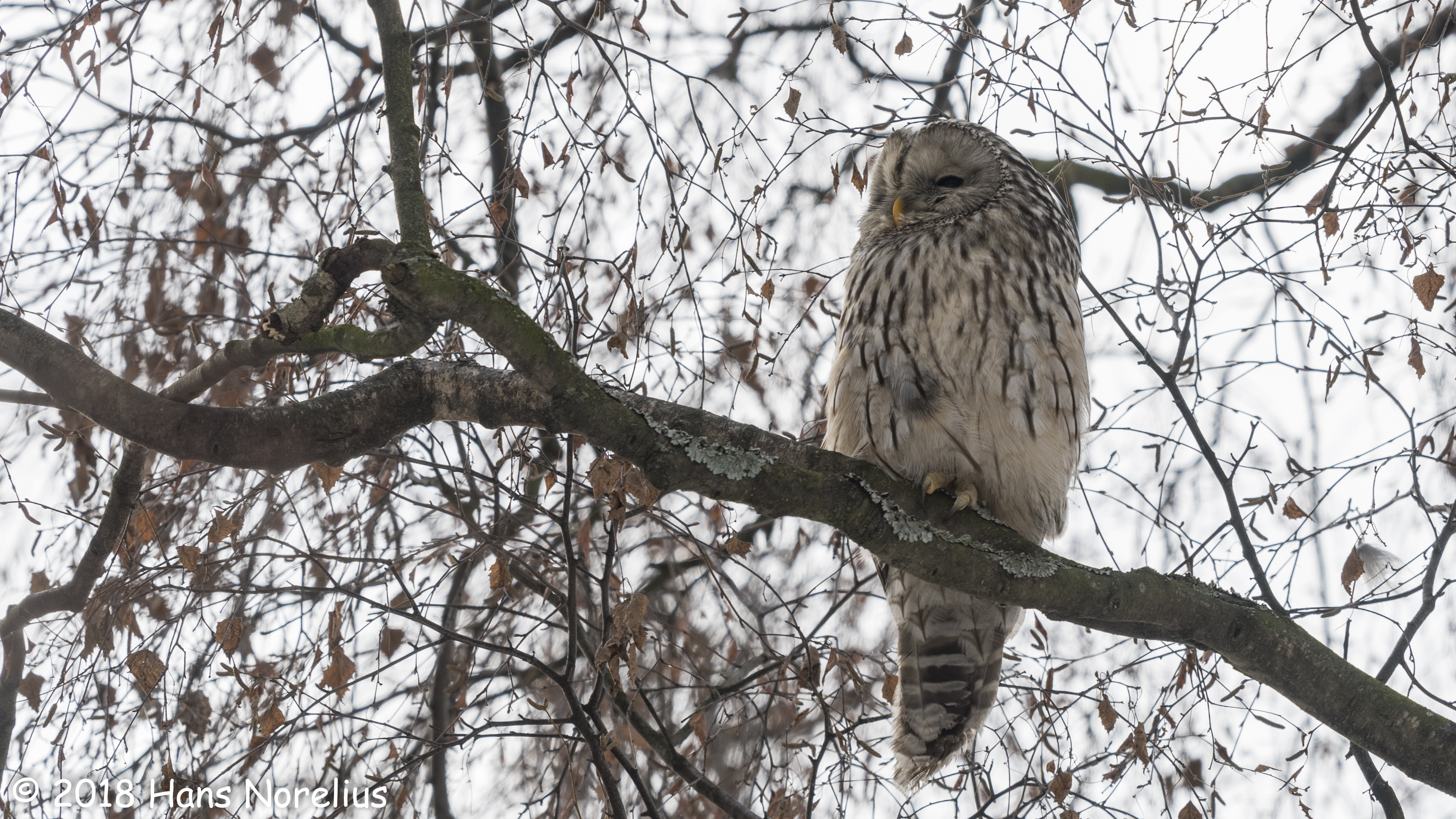
Ural owl, Stockholm

== Osprey ==
Order: Accipitriformes Family: Pandionidae

Pandionidae is a family of fish-eating birds of prey, possessing a very large, powerful hooked beak for tearing flesh from their prey, strong legs, powerful talons, and keen eyesight. The family has only one extant species.

- Osprey (fiskgjuse) Pandion haliaetus (B)
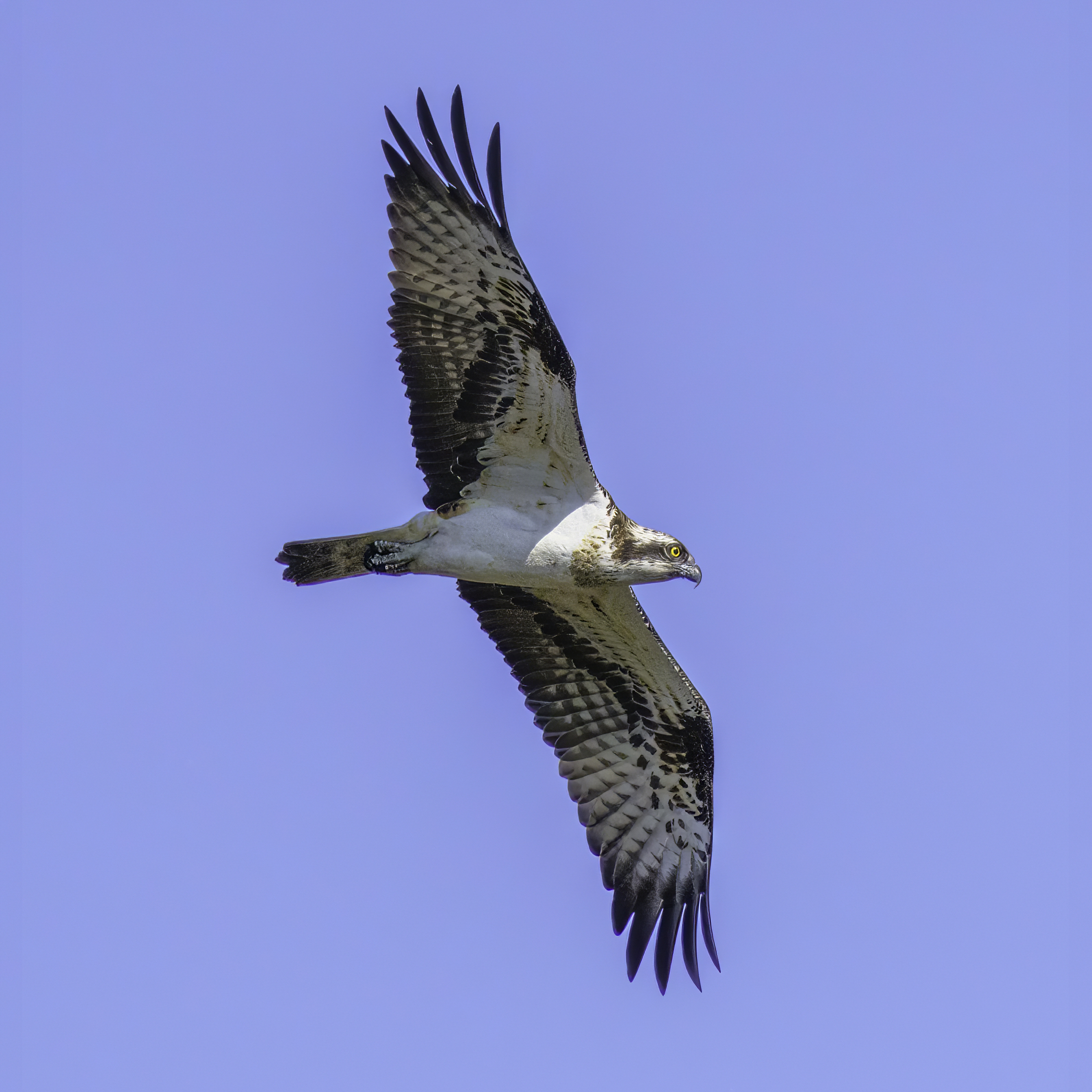
Osprey, Bogesund, Vaxholm, Stockholm

== Hawks, eagles, and kites ==
Order: Accipitriformes Family: Accipitridae

Accipitridae is a family of birds of prey and includes hawks, eagles, kites, harriers, and Old World vultures. These birds have very large powerful hooked beaks for tearing flesh from their prey, strong legs, powerful talons, and keen eyesight.

- Black-winged kite (svartvingad glada) Elanus caeruleus (R)
- Egyptian vulture (smutsgam) Neophron percnopterus (R)
- European honey buzzard (bivråk) Pernis apivorus (B)
- Cinereous vulture (grågam) Aegypius monachus (R)
- Griffon vulture (gåsgam) Gyps fulvus (R)
- Short-toed snake eagle (ormörn) Circaetus gallicus (O)
- Greater spotted eagle (större skrikörn) Clanga clanga (O)
- Lesser spotted eagle (mindre skrikörn) Clanga pomarina (O)
- Booted eagle (dvärgörn) Hieraaetus pennatus (R)
- Steppe eagle (stäppörn) Aquila nipalensis (R)
- Eastern imperial eagle (kejsarörn) Aquila heliaca (R)
- Golden eagle (kungsörn) Aquila chrysaetos (B)
- Bonelli's eagle (hökörn) Aquila fasciata (R)
- Eurasian sparrowhawk (sparvhök) Accipiter nisus (B)
- Eurasian goshawk (duvhök) Astur gentilis (B)
- Pallid harrier (stäpphök) Circus macrourus (O)
- Hen harrier (blå kärrhök) Circus cyaneus (B)
- Montagu's harrier (ängshök) Circus pygargus (B)
- Eurasian marsh harrier (brun kärrhök) Circus aeruginosus (B)
- Red kite (röd glada) Milvus milvus (B)
- Black kite (brun glada) Milvus migrans (b)
- White-tailed eagle (havsörn) Haliaeetus albicilla (B)
- Rough-legged hawk (fjällvråk) Buteo lagopus (B)
- Common buzzard (ormvråk) Buteo buteo (B)
- Long-legged buzzard (örnvråk) Buteo rufinus (R)
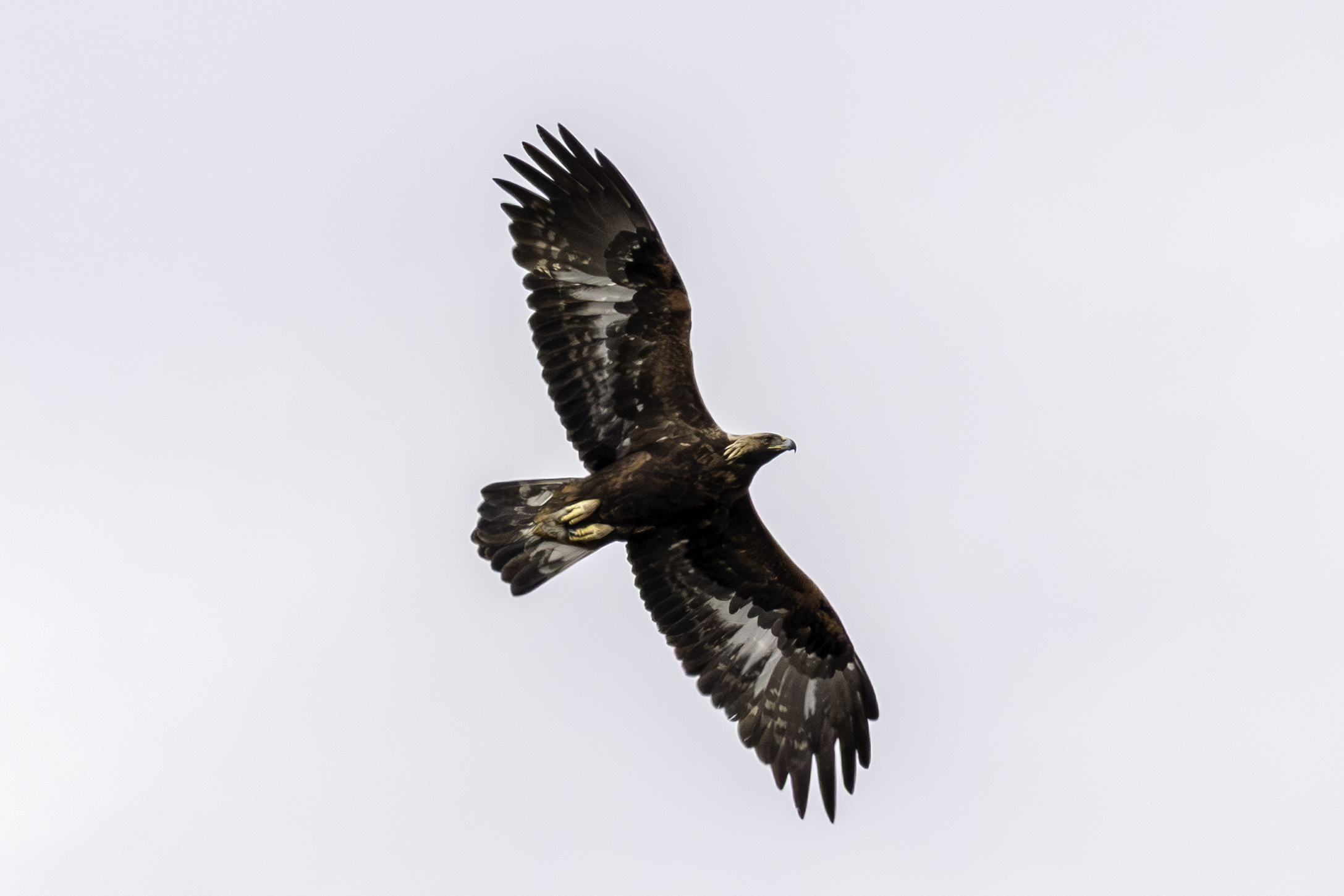
Golden eagle, Sävvät, Gotland

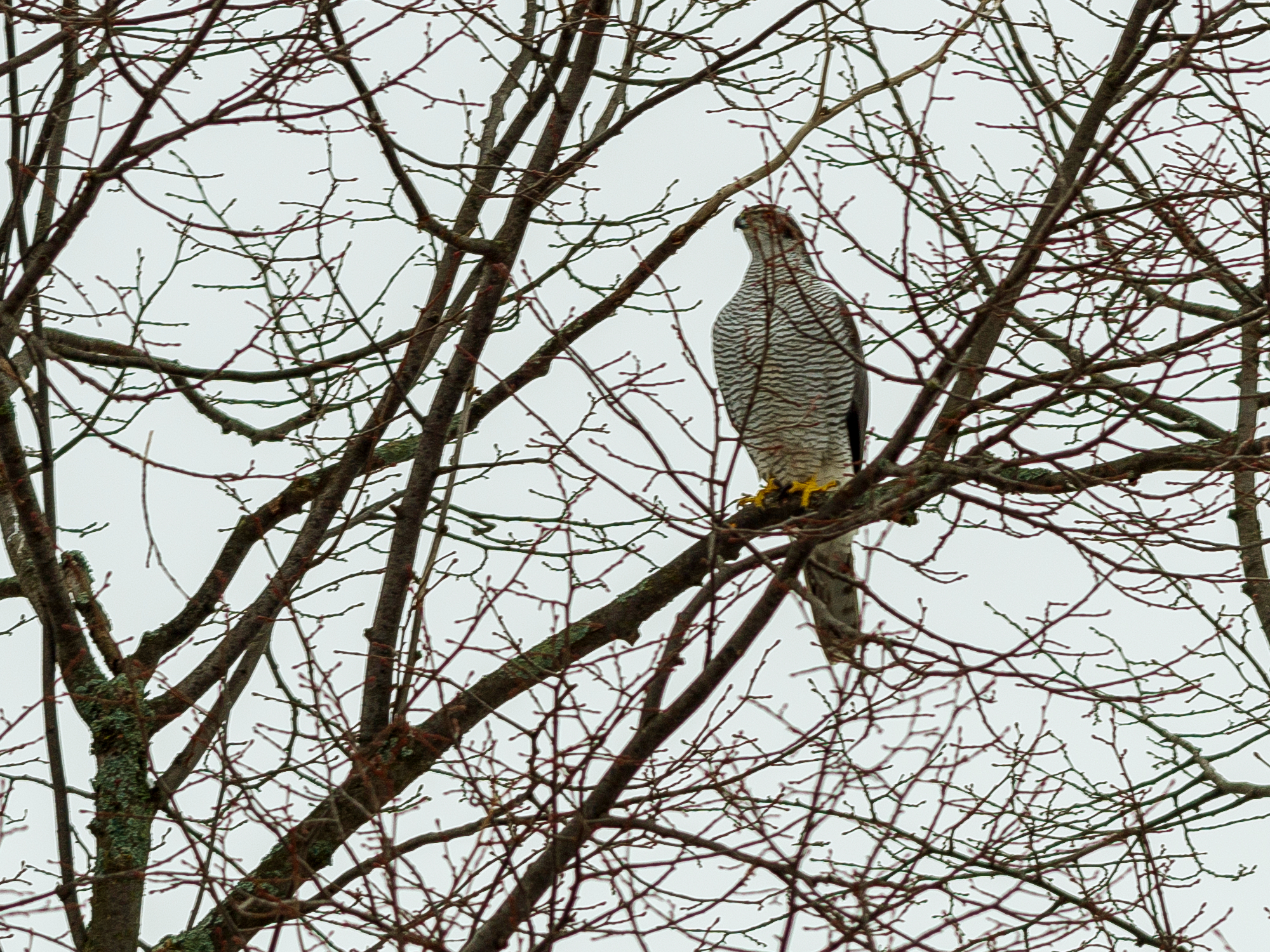
Eurasian goshawk, Vaxholm, Stockholm

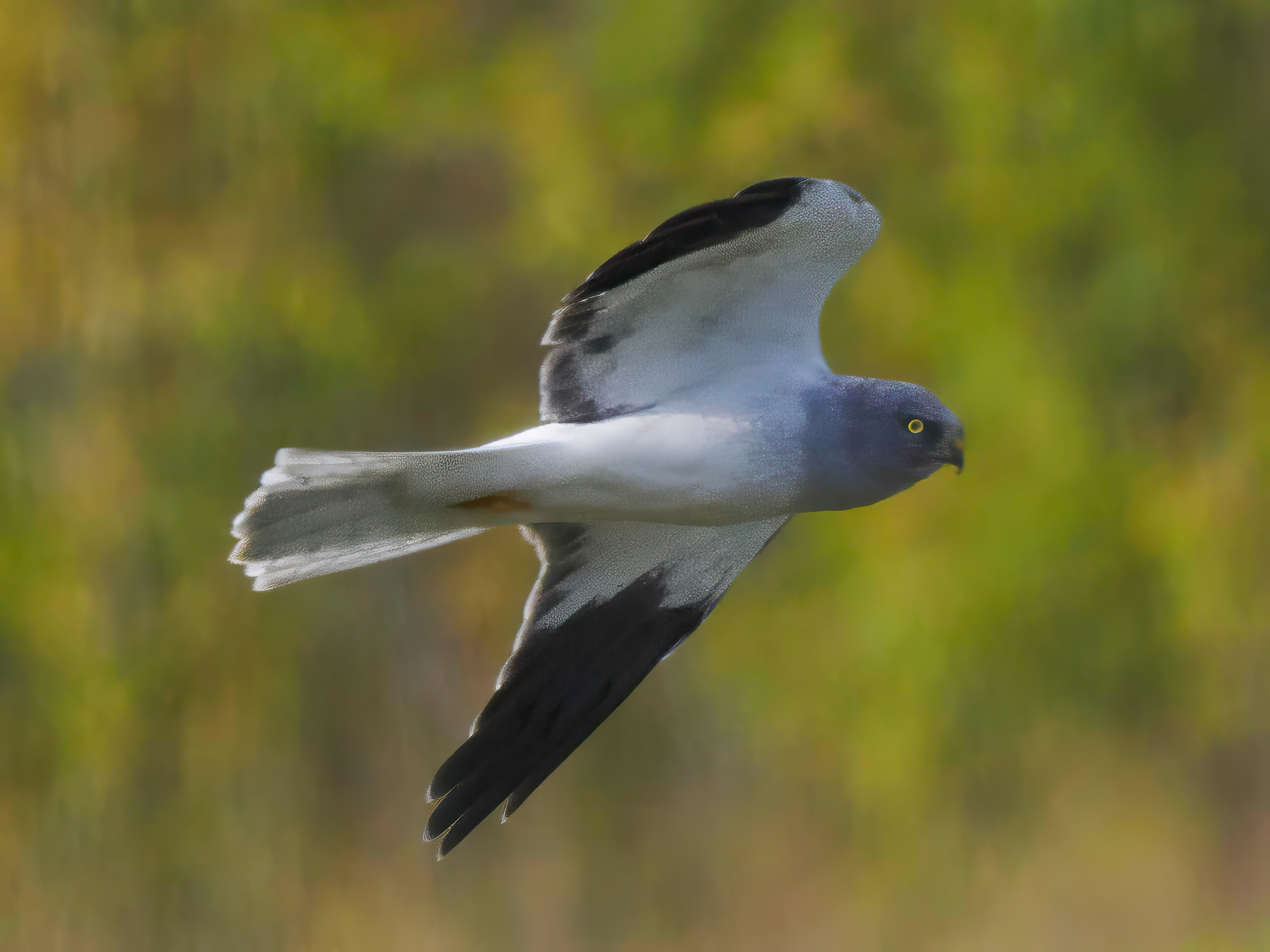
Hen harrier, Sweden

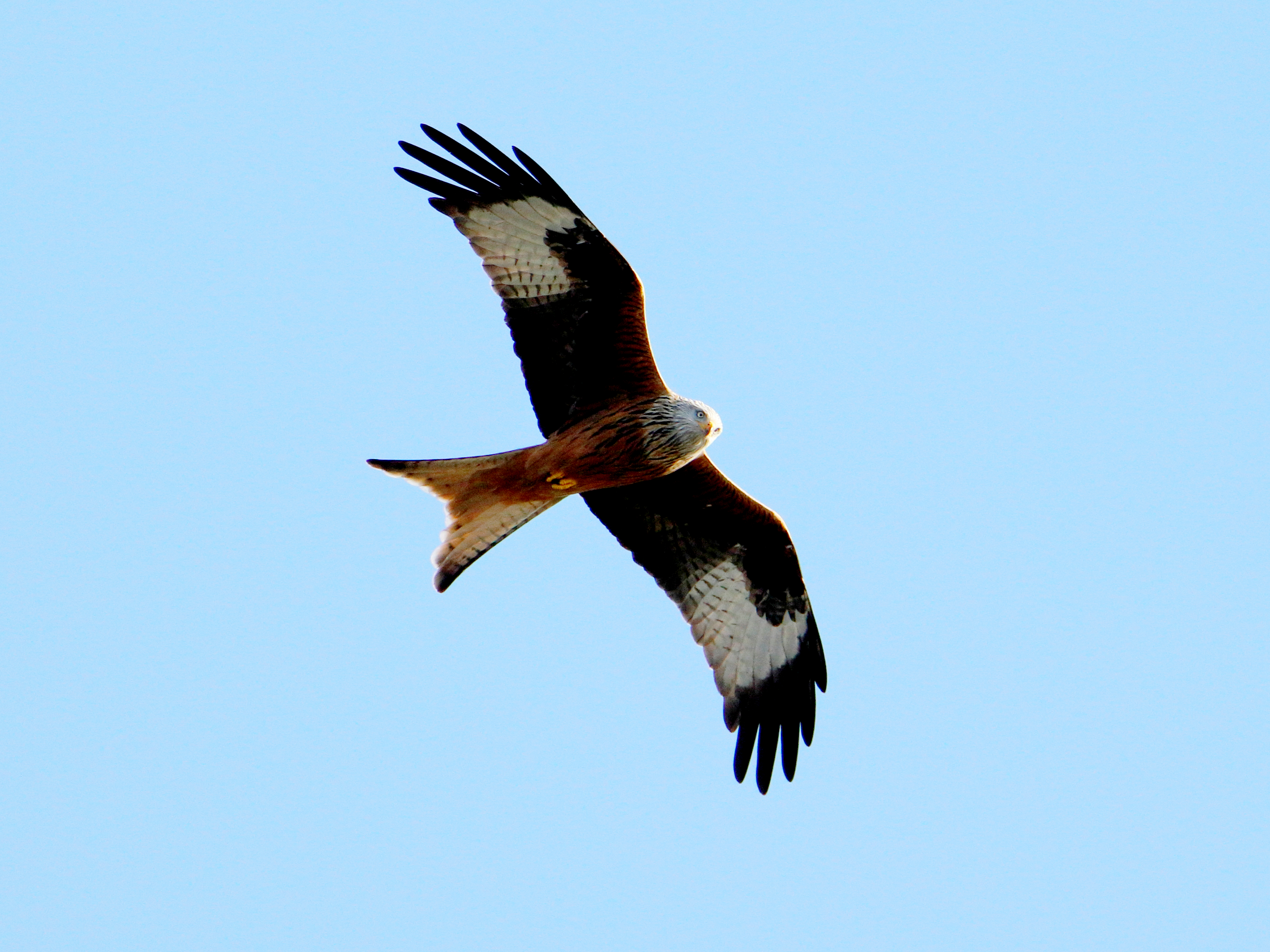
Red kite, Klingavälsåns dalgång, Lund, Scania

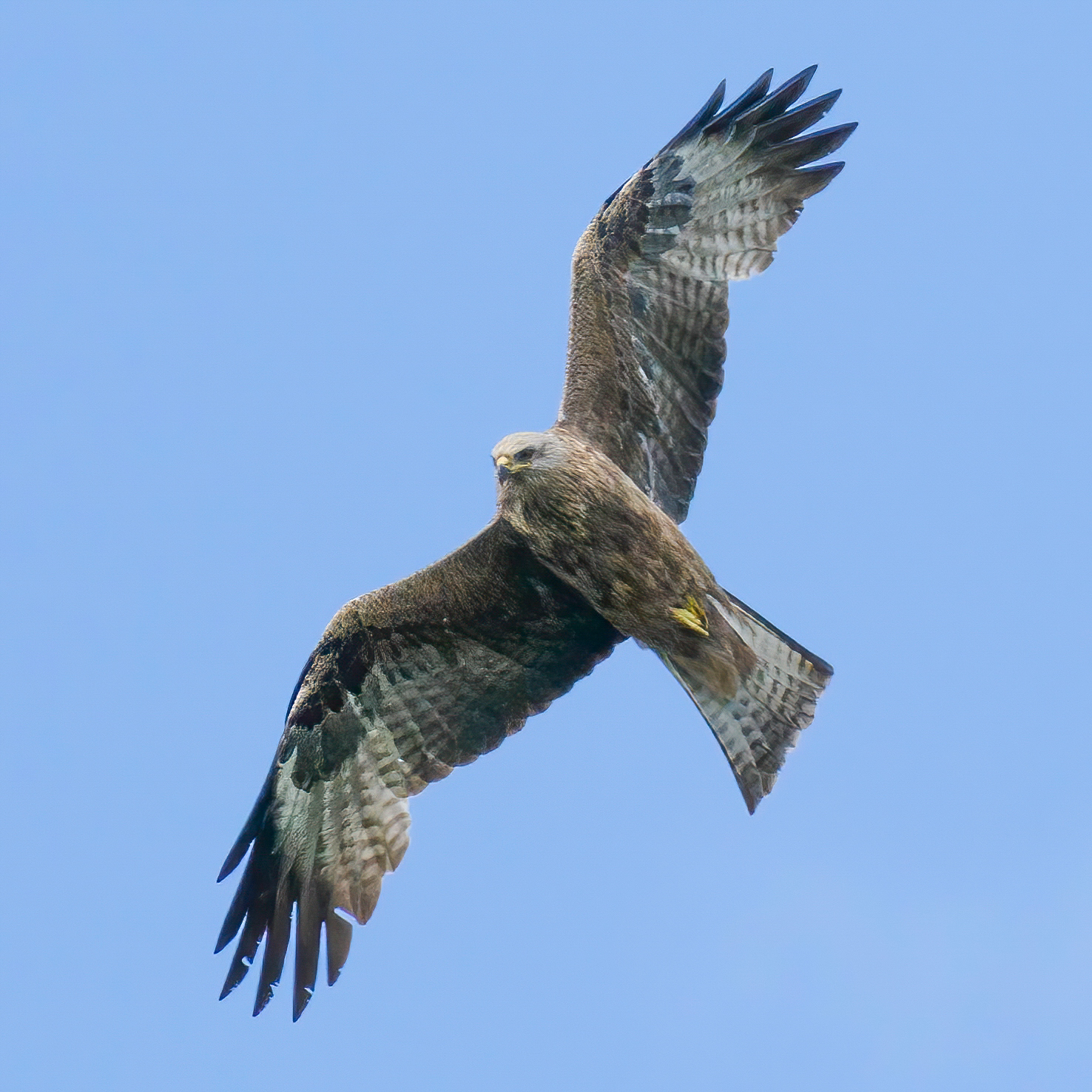
Black kite, Vaxholm, Stockholm

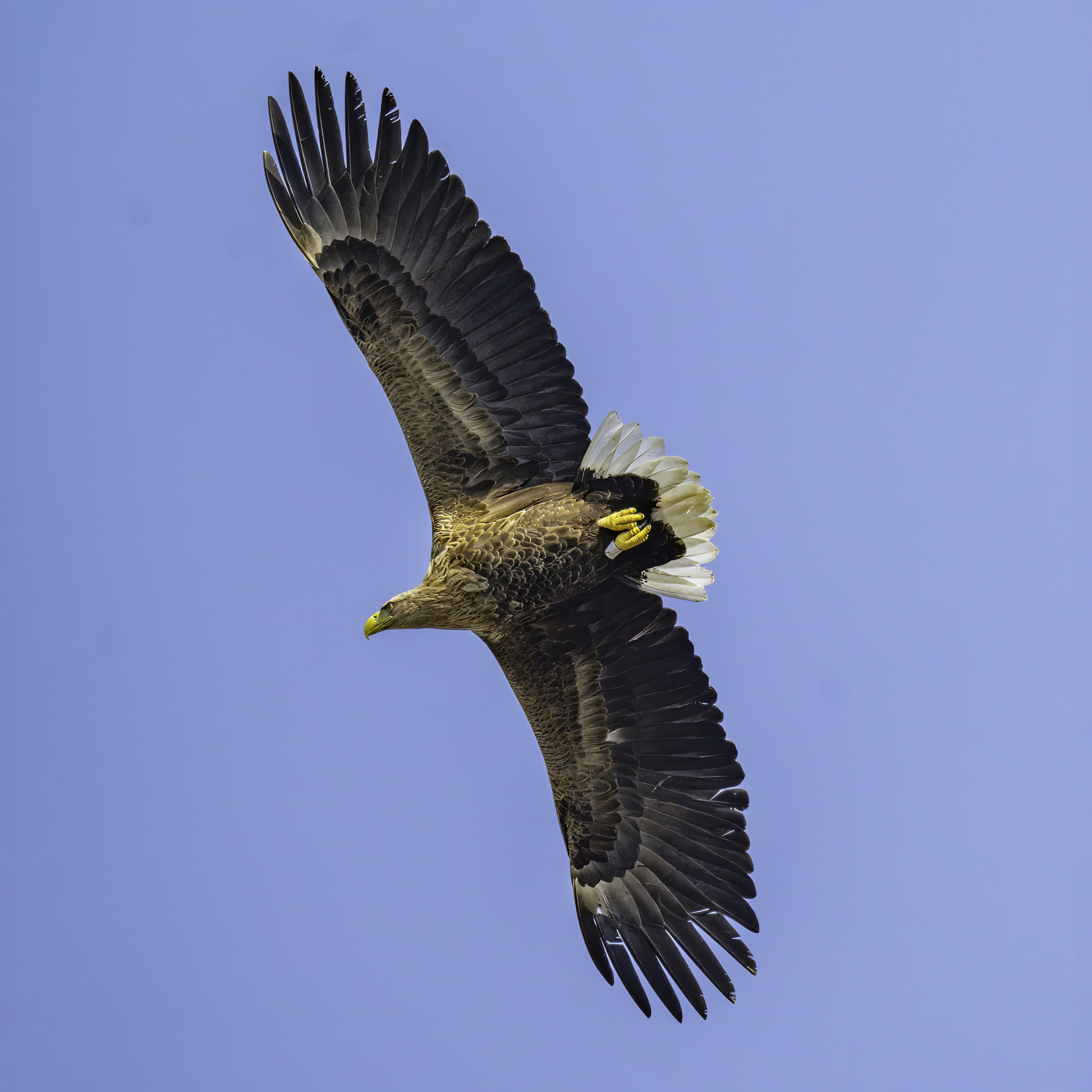
White-tailed eagle, Bogesund, Vaxholm, Stockholm

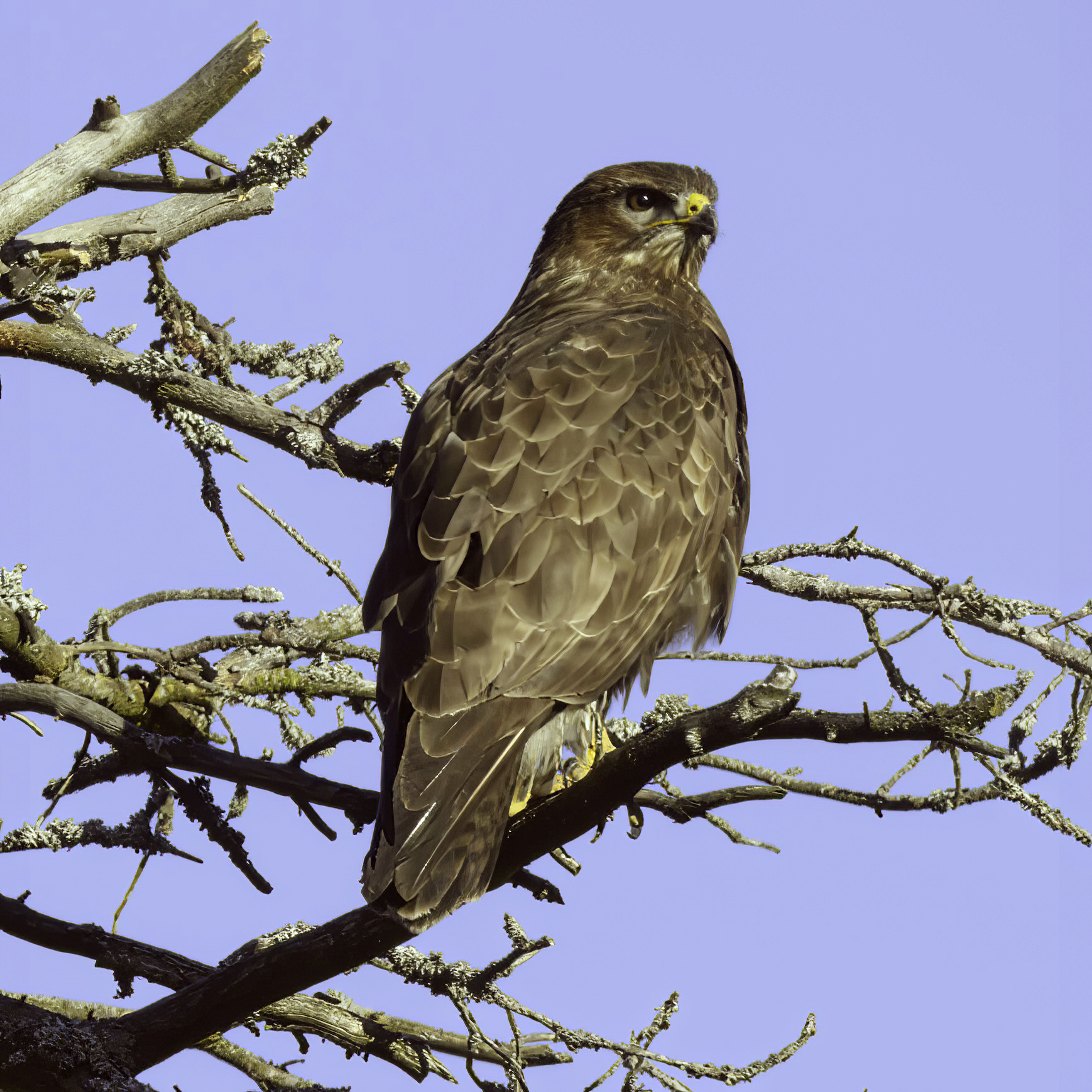
Common buzzard, Bogesund, Vaxholm, Stockholm

== Hoopoes ==
Order: Bucerotiformes Family: Upupidae

Hoopoes have black, white and orangey-pink plumage with a large erectile crest on their head.

- Common hoopoe (härfågel) Upupa epops (O)

== Rollers ==
Order: Coraciiformes Family: Coraciidae

Rollers resemble crows in size and build, but are more closely related to the kingfishers and bee-eaters. They share the colourful appearance of those groups with blues and browns predominating. The two inner front toes are connected, but the outer toe is not.

- European roller (blåkråka) Coracias garrulus (O)

== Bee-eaters ==
Order: Coraciiformes Family: Meropidae

The bee-eaters are a group of birds in the family Meropidae. Most species are found in Africa and Asia but others occur in southern Europe, Madagascar, Australia and New Guinea. They are characterised by richly coloured plumage, slender bodies and usually elongated central tail feathers. All have long downturned bills and pointed wings, which give them a swallow-like appearance when seen from afar.

- European bee-eater (biätare) Merops apiaster (O)
- Blue-cheeked bee-eater (grön biätare) Merops persicus (R)

== Kingfishers ==
Order: Coraciiformes Family: Alcedinidae

Kingfishers are medium-sized birds with large heads, long, pointed bills, short legs and stubby tails.

- Common kingfisher (kungsfiskare) Alcedo atthis (B)

== Woodpeckers ==
Order: Piciformes Family: Picidae

Woodpeckers are small to medium-sized birds with chisel-like beaks, short legs, stiff tails and long tongues used for capturing insects. Most species have feet with two toes pointing forward and two backward, while species in the genera Picoides and Sasia have only three toes. Many woodpeckers have the habit of tapping noisily on tree trunks with their beaks. One species, the middle spotted woodpecker, used to breed in Sweden but has since become locally extinct.

- Eurasian wryneck (göktyta) Jynx torquilla (B)
- Grey-headed woodpecker (gråspett) Picus canus (B)
- Eurasian green woodpecker (gröngöling) Picus viridis (B)
- Black woodpecker (spillkråka) Dryocopus martius (B)
- Eurasian three-toed woodpecker (tretåig hackspett) Picoides tridactylus (B)
- Middle spotted woodpecker (mellanspett) Dendrocoptes medius (R)
- White-backed woodpecker (vitryggig hackspett) Dendrocopos leucotos (B)
- Great spotted woodpecker (större hackspett) Dendrocopos major (B)
- Lesser spotted woodpecker (mindre hackspett) Dryobates minor (B)
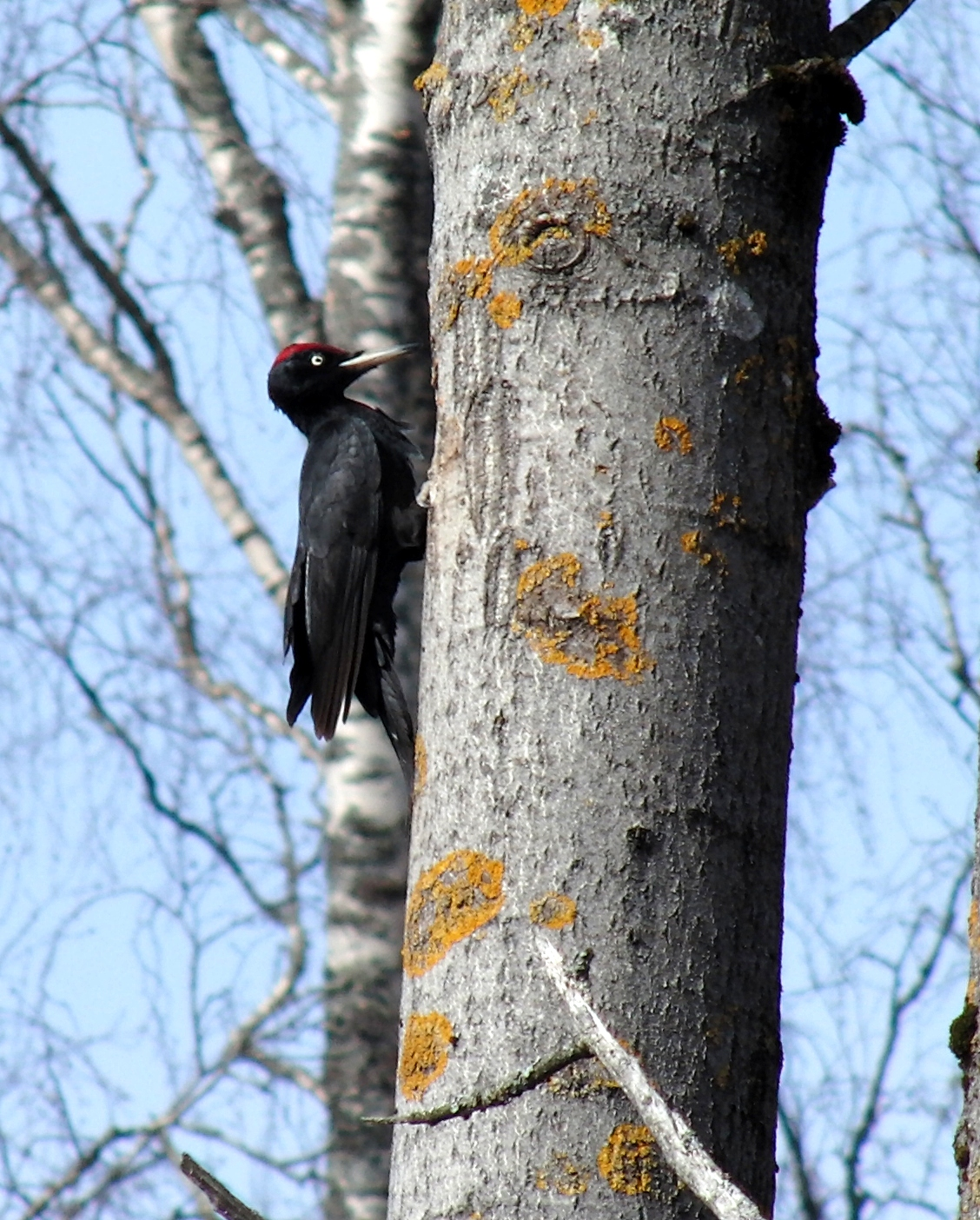
Black woodpecker, Fröbol, Värmland

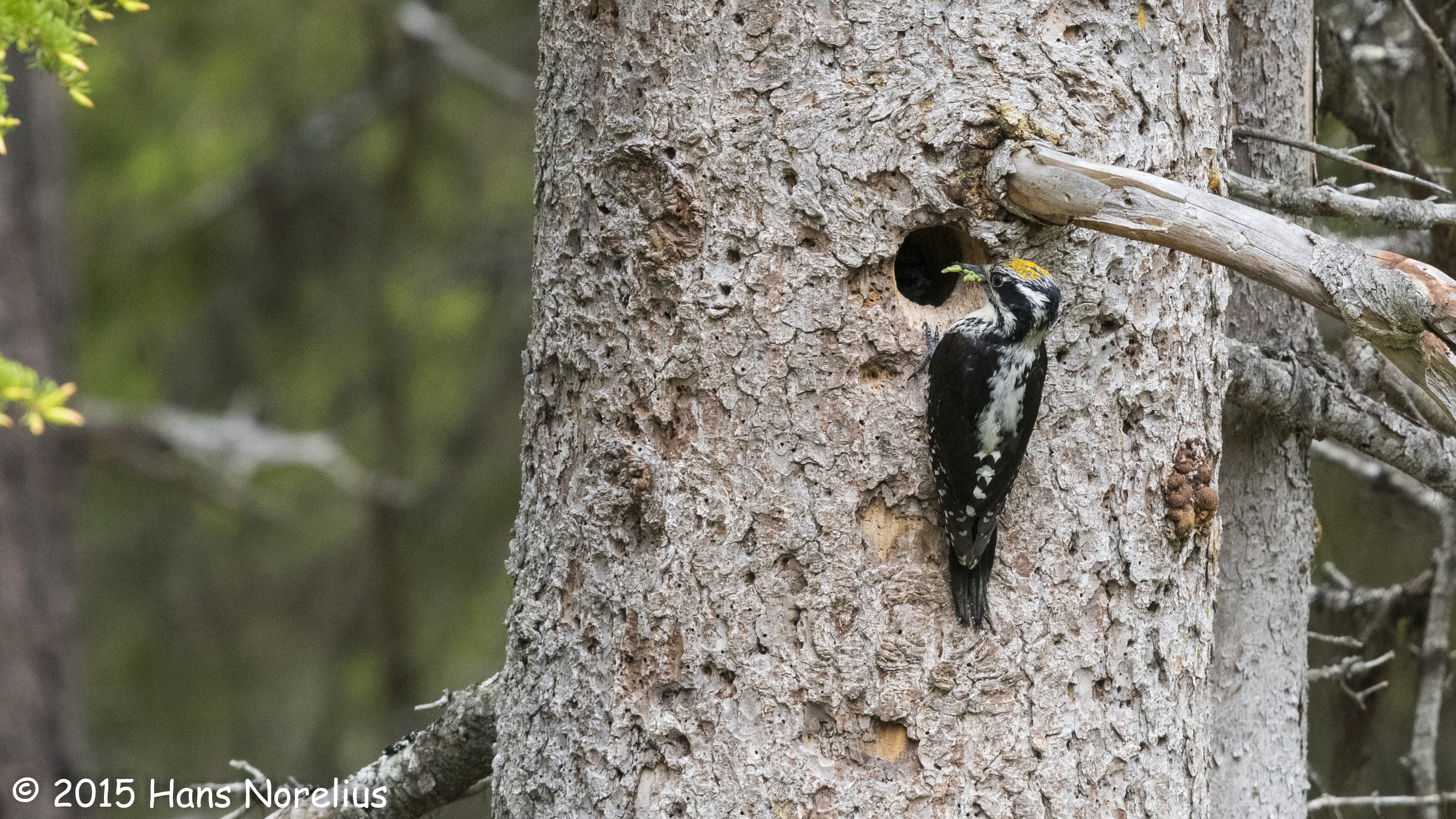
Eurasian three-toed woodpecker, Funäsdalen, Härjedalen

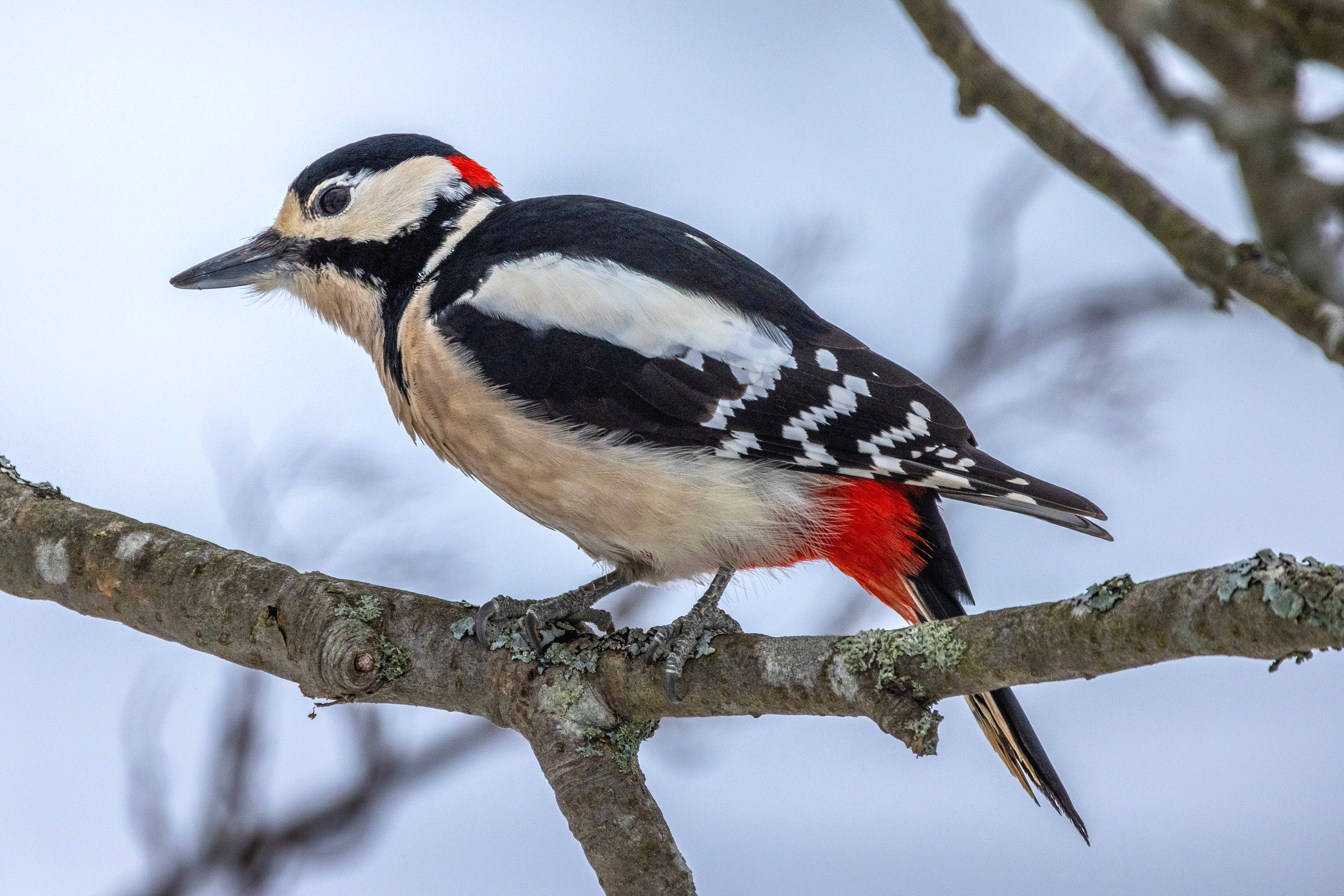
Great spotted woodpecker, Vaxholm, Stockholm

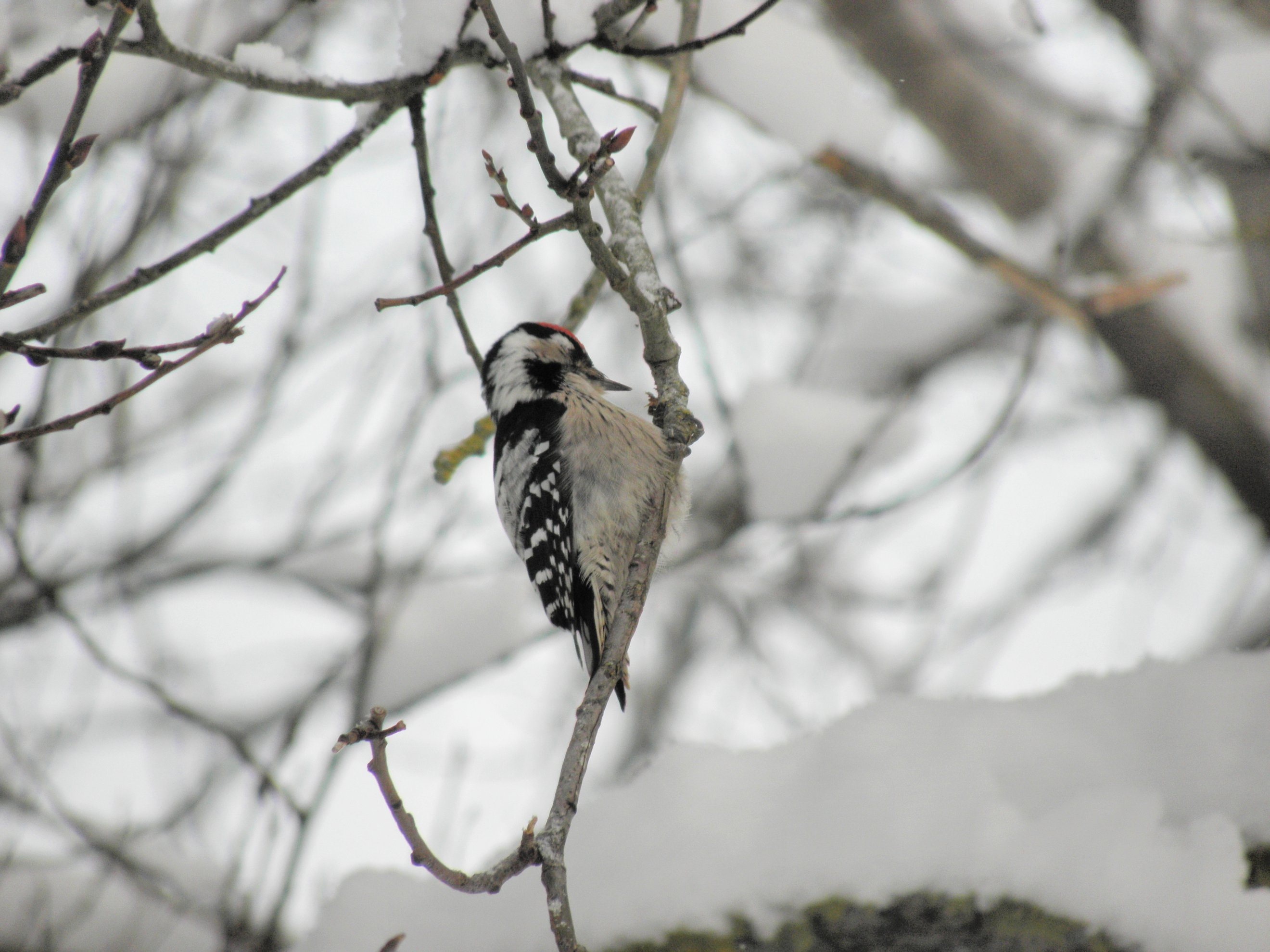
Lesser spotted woodpecker, Tybble, Örebro

== Falcons and caracaras ==
Order: Falconiformes Family: Falconidae

Falconidae is a family of diurnal birds of prey. They differ from hawks, eagles and kites in that they kill with their beaks instead of their talons.

- Lesser kestrel (rödfalk) Falco naumanni (R)
- Common kestrel (tornfalk) Falco tinnunculus (B)
- Red-footed falcon (aftonfalk) Falco vespertinus (O)
- Amur falcon (amurfalk) Falco amurensis (R)
- Merlin (stenfalk) Falco columbarius (B)
- Eleonora's falcon (eleonorafalk) Falco eleonorae (R)
- Eurasian hobby (lärkfalk) Falco subbuteo (B)
- Peregrine falcon (pilgrimsfalk) Falco peregrinus (B)
- Gyrfalcon (jaktfalk) Falco rusticolus (B)
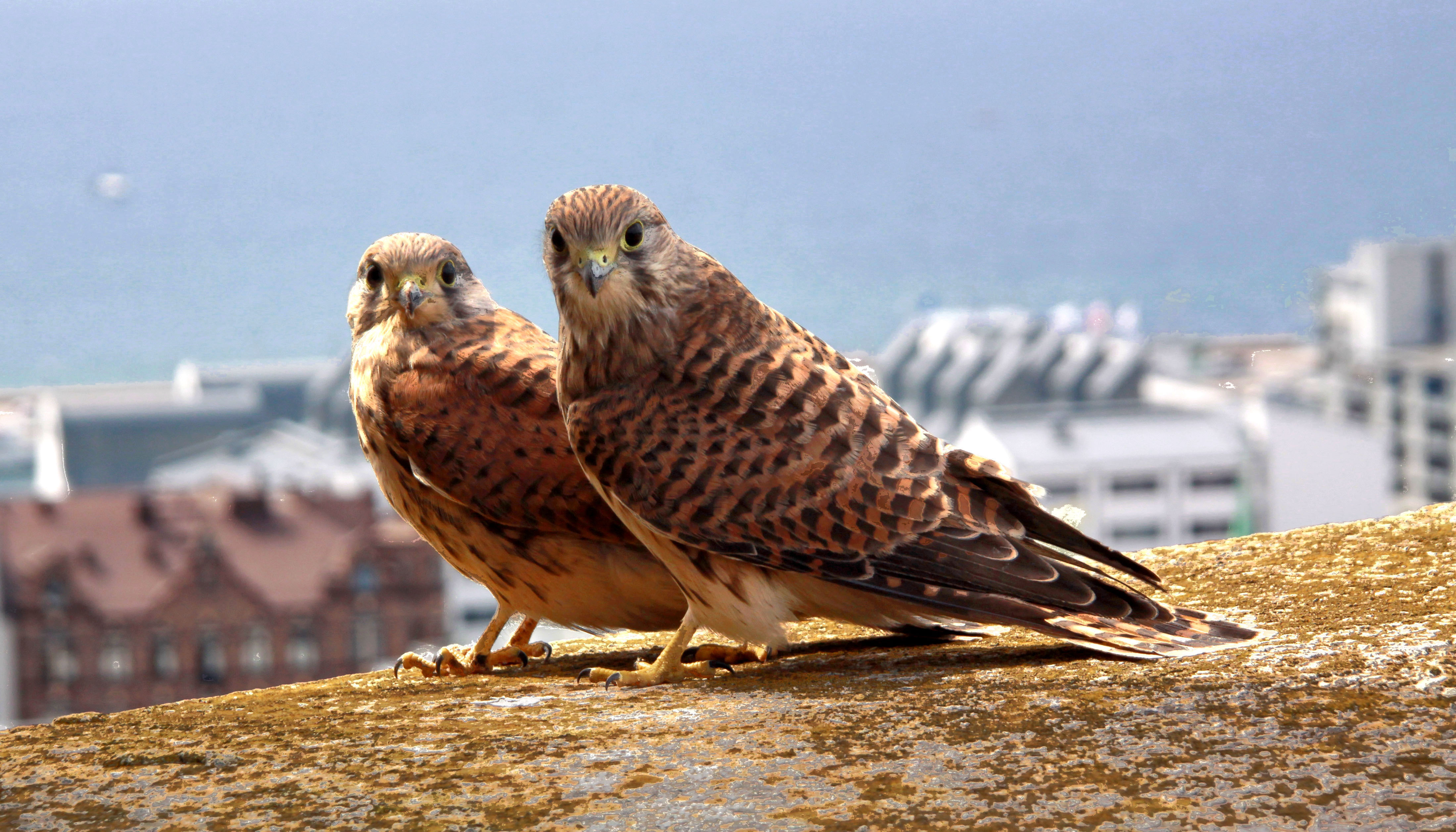
Common kestrel, Helsingborg, Scania

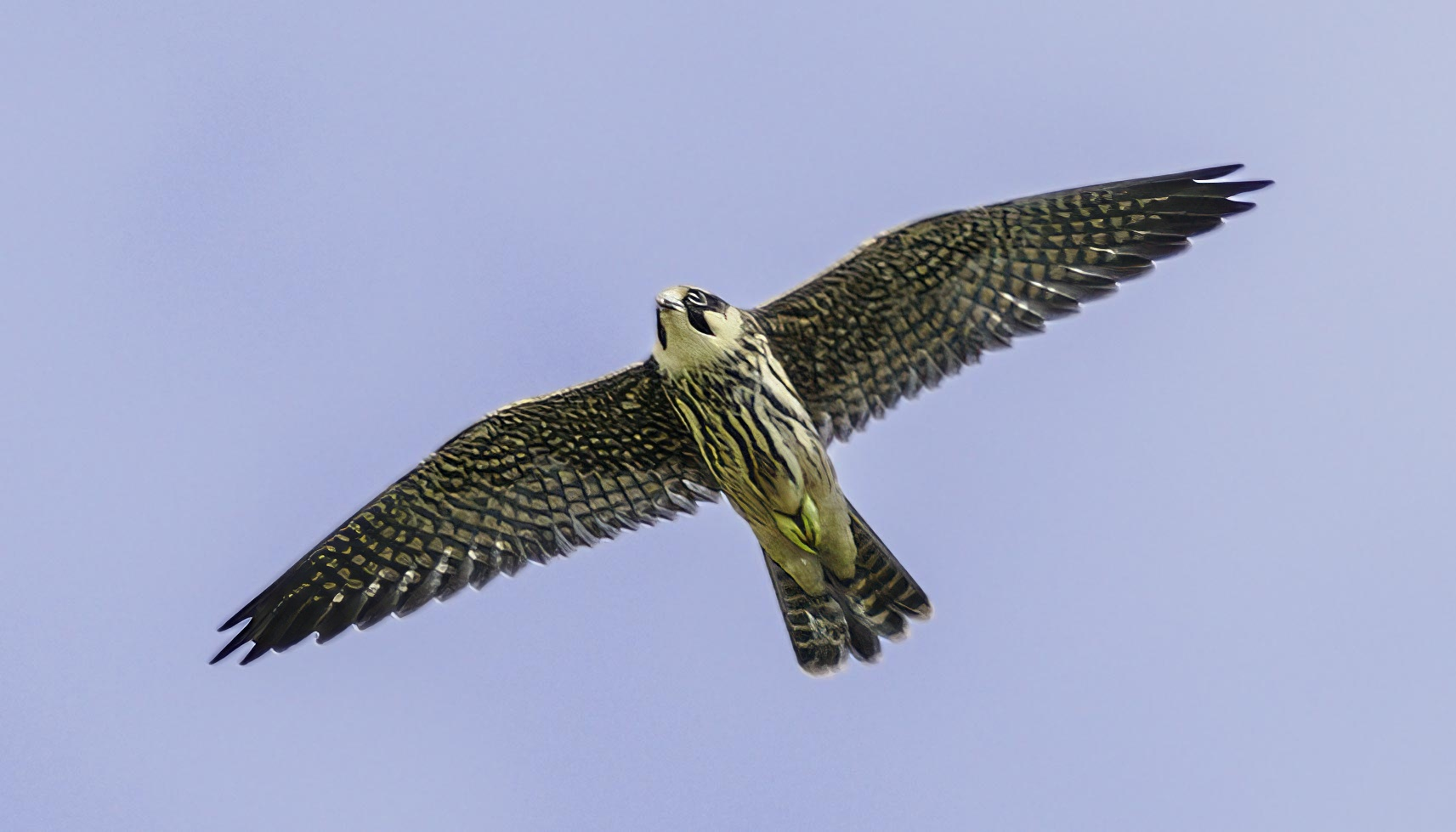
Eurasian hobby, Vaxholm

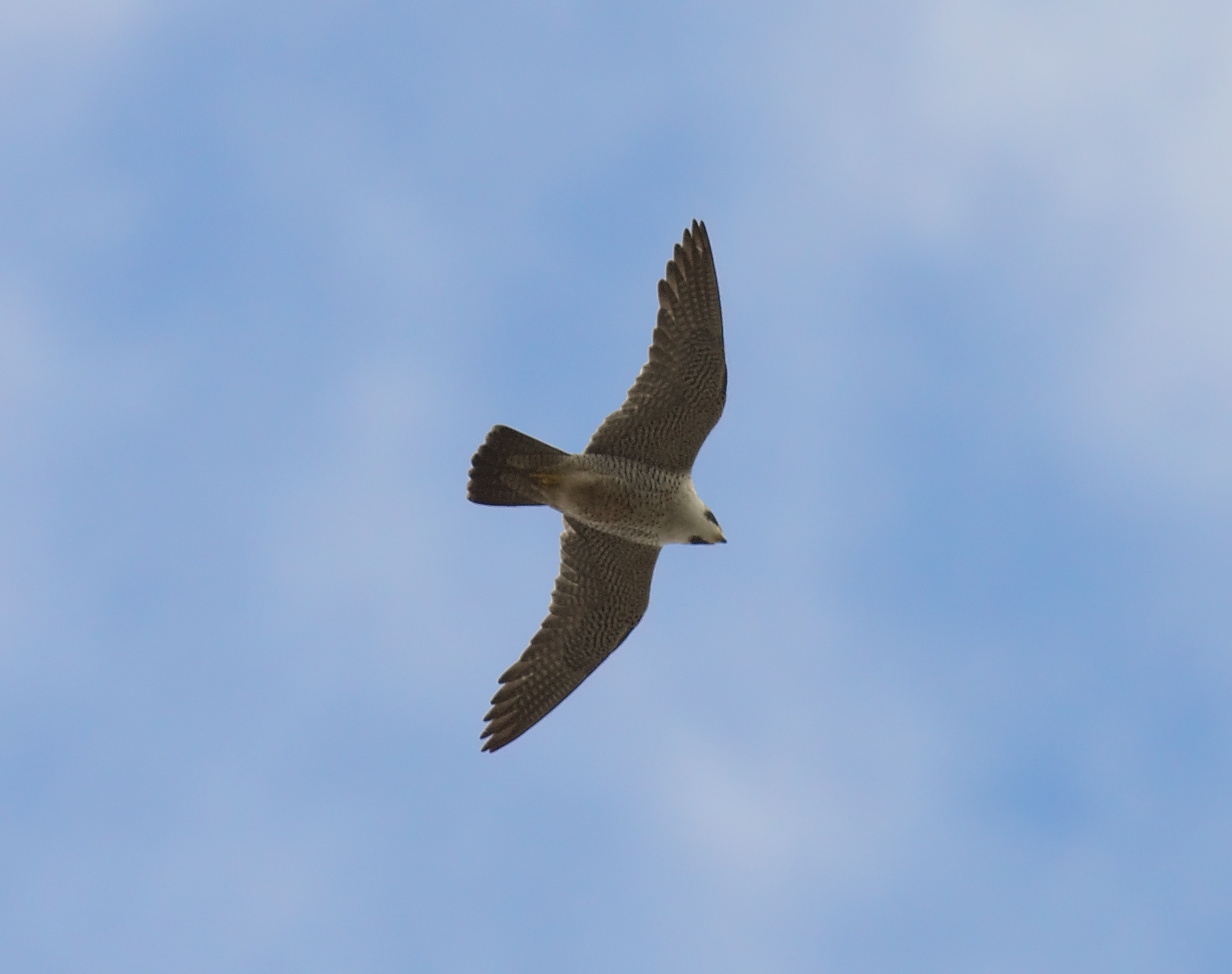
Peregrine falcon, Gothenburg

== Vireos ==
Order: Passeriformes Family: Vireonidae

The vireos are a group of small to medium-sized passerine birds. They are typically greenish in color and resemble wood-warblers apart from their heavier bills.

- Red-eyed vireo (rödögd vireo) Vireo olivaceus (R)

== Old World orioles ==
Order: Passeriformes Family: Oriolidae

The Old World orioles are colourful passerine birds. They are not closely related to the New World orioles.

- Eurasian golden oriole (sommargylling) Oriolus oriolus (B)

== Shrikes ==
Order: Passeriformes Family: Laniidae

Shrikes are passerine birds known for their habit of catching large insects, small birds and other small animals and impaling the uneaten portions of their bodies on thorns. A shrike's beak is hooked, like that of a typical bird of prey.

- Great grey shrike (varfågel) Lanius excubitor (B)
- Northern shrike (beringvarfågel) Lanius borealis (R)
- Masked shrike (masktörnskata) Lanius nubicus (R)
- Lesser grey shrike (svartpannad törnskata) Lanius minor (O)
- Woodchat shrike (rödhuvad törnskata) Lanius senator (O)
- Isabelline shrike (isabellatörnskata) Lanius isabellinus (R)
- Red-backed shrike (törnskata) Lanius collurio (B)
- Red-tailed shrike (turkestantörnskata) Lanius phoenicuroides (R)
- Long-tailed shrike (rostgumpad törnskata) Lanius schach (R)
- Brown shrike (brun törnskata) Lanius cristatus (R)
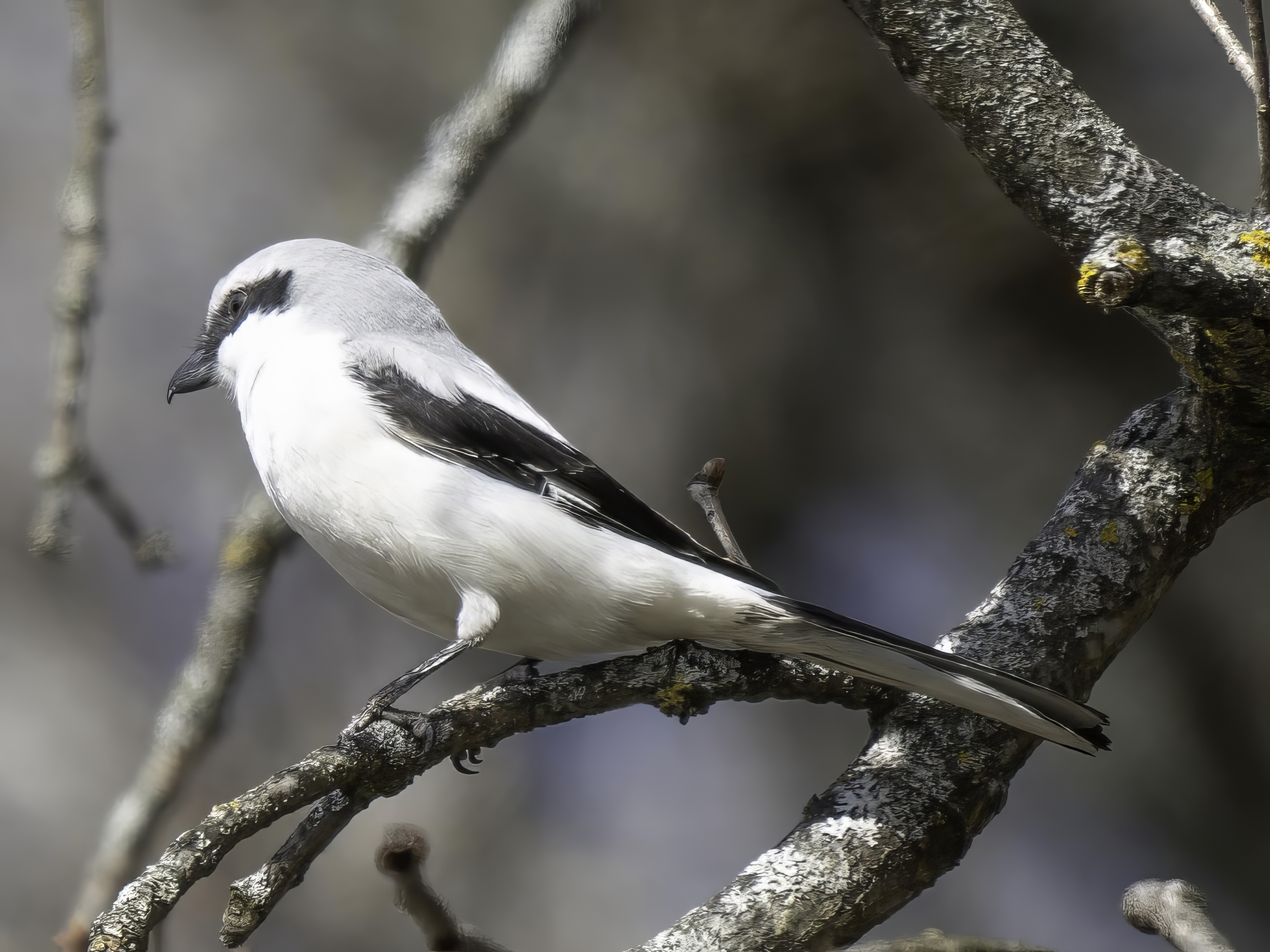
Great grey shrike, Bogesund, Vaxholm, Stockholm

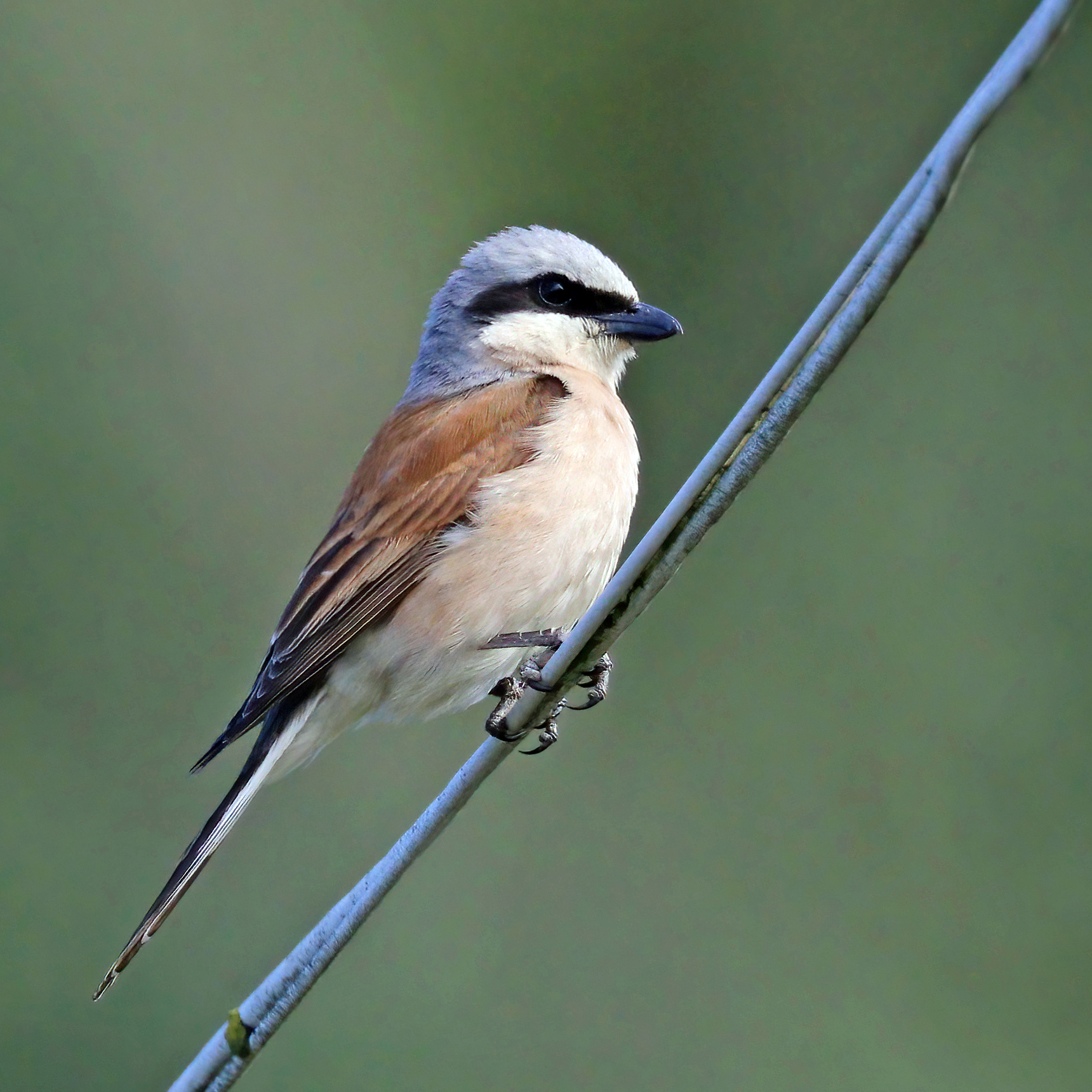
Red-backed shrike, Bovallstrand, Västra Götaland

== Crows, jays, and magpies ==
Order: Passeriformes Family: Corvidae

The family Corvidae includes crows, ravens, jays, magpies, and nutcrackers. Corvids are above average in size among the Passeriformes, and many of the species show high levels of intelligence.

- Siberian jay (lavskrika) Perisoreus infaustus (B)
- Eurasian jay (nötskrika) Garrulus glandarius (B)
- Eurasian magpie (skata) Pica pica (B)
- Northern nutcracker (nötkråka) Nucifraga caryocatactes (B)
- Daurian jackdaw (klippkaja) Coloeus dauuricus (R)
- Western jackdaw (kaja) Coloeus monedula (B)
- Rook (råka) Corvus frugilegus (B)
- Northern raven (korp) Corvus corax (B)
- Carrion crow (kråka) Corvus corone (B)
  - Western carrion crow (svartkråka) Corvus corone corone (O)
  - Hooded crow (gråkråka) Corvus corone cornix (B)
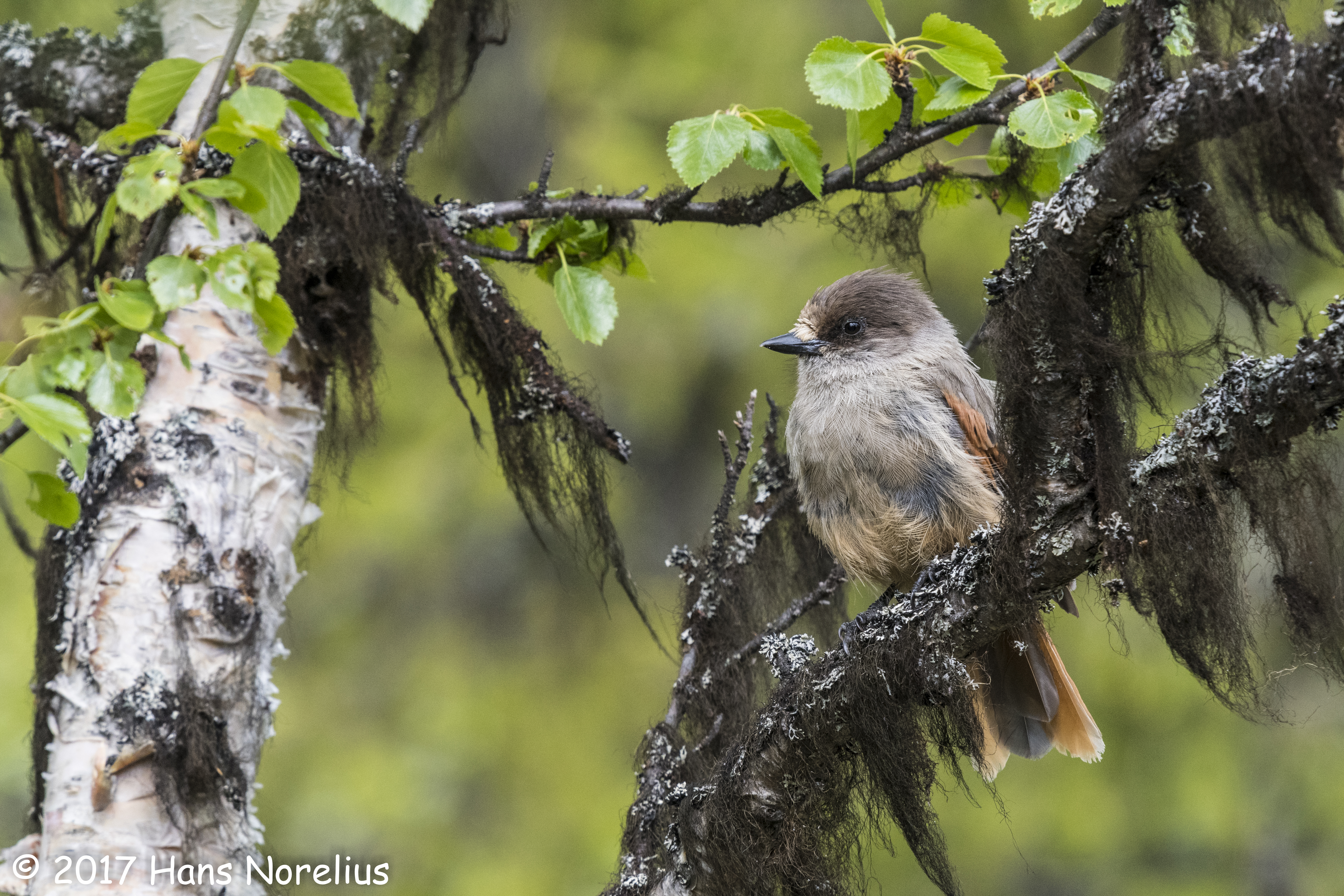
Siberian jay, Funäsdalen, Jämtland

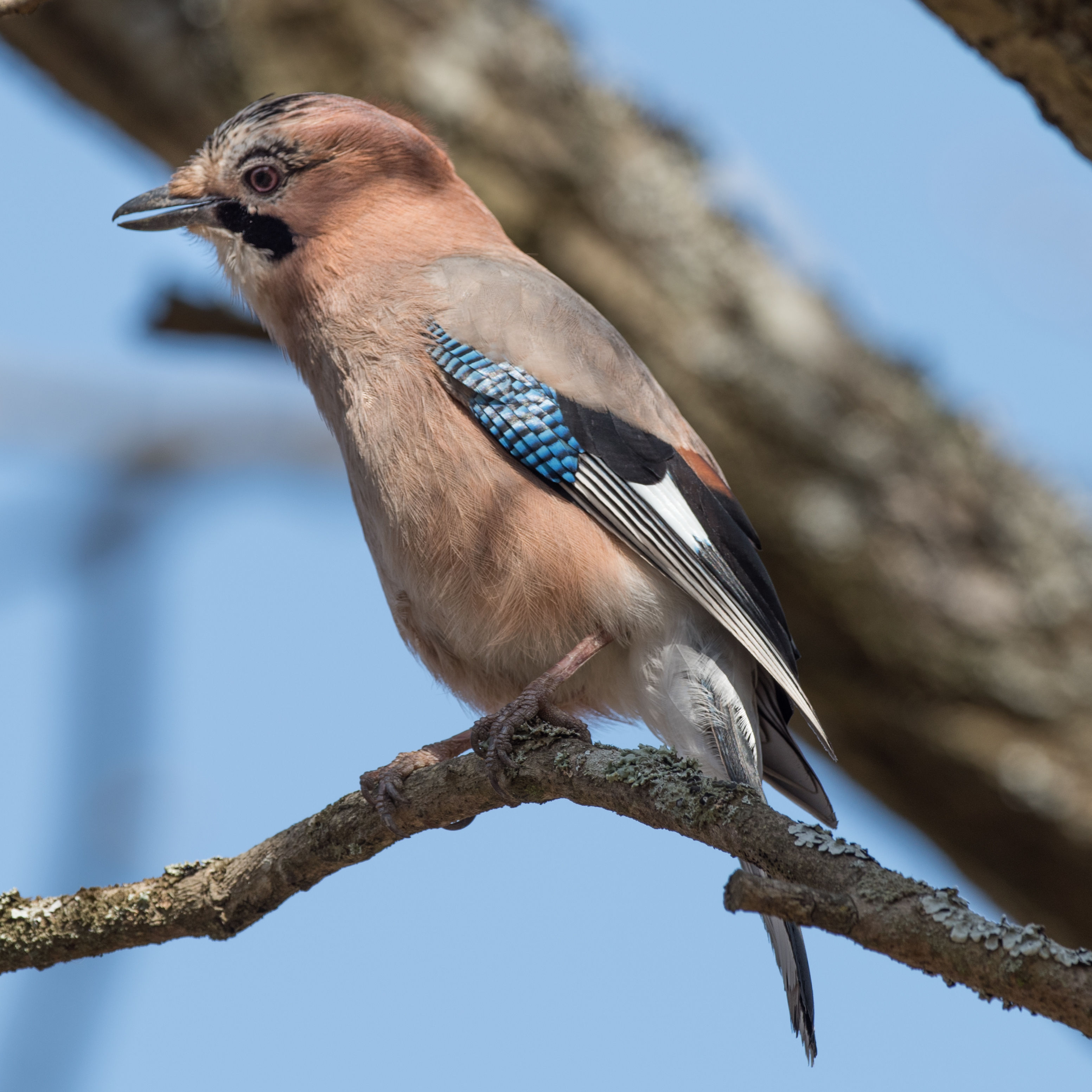
Eurasian jay, Stockholm

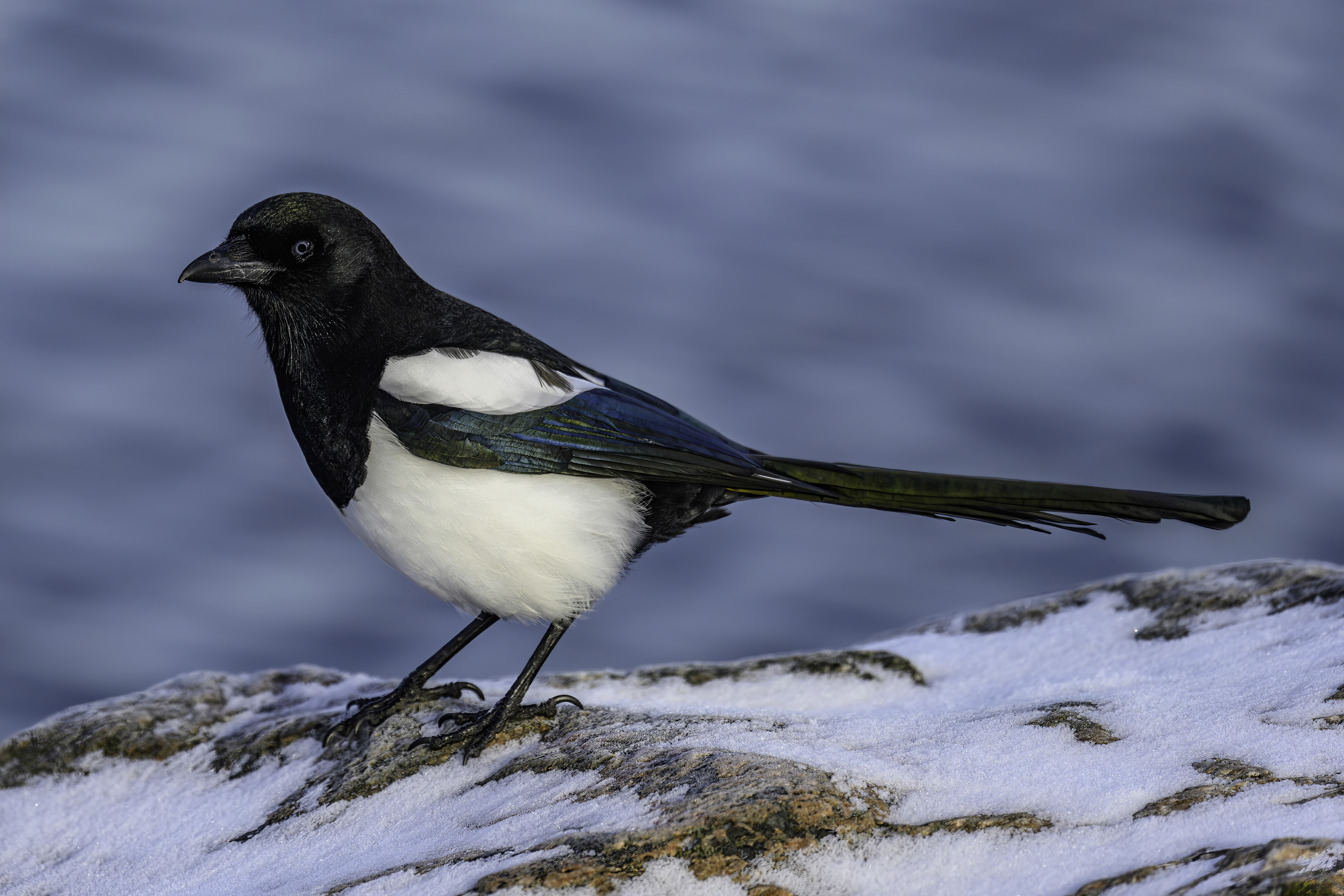
Eurasian magpie, Vaxholm, Stockholm

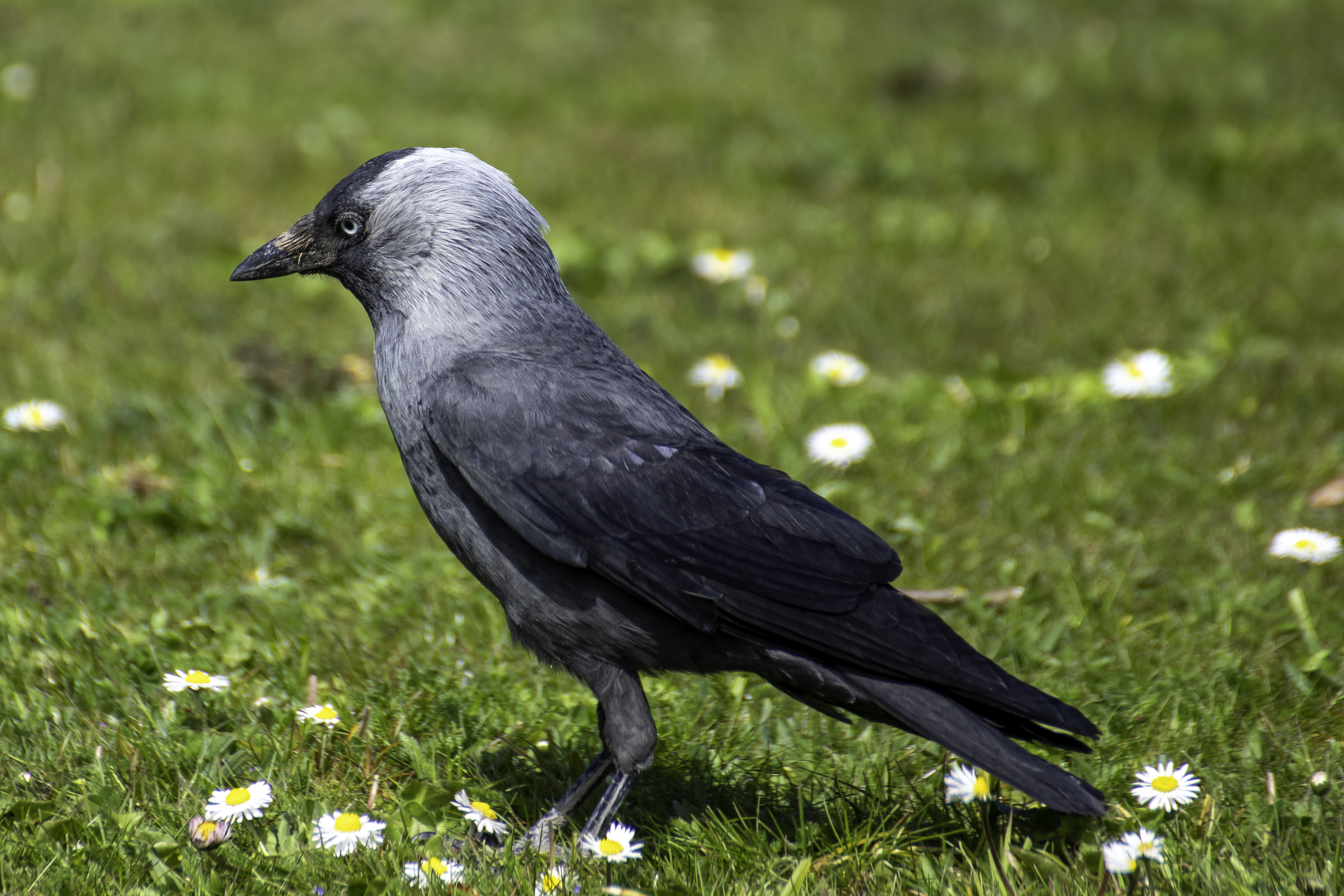
Eurasian jackdaw, Roma, Gotland

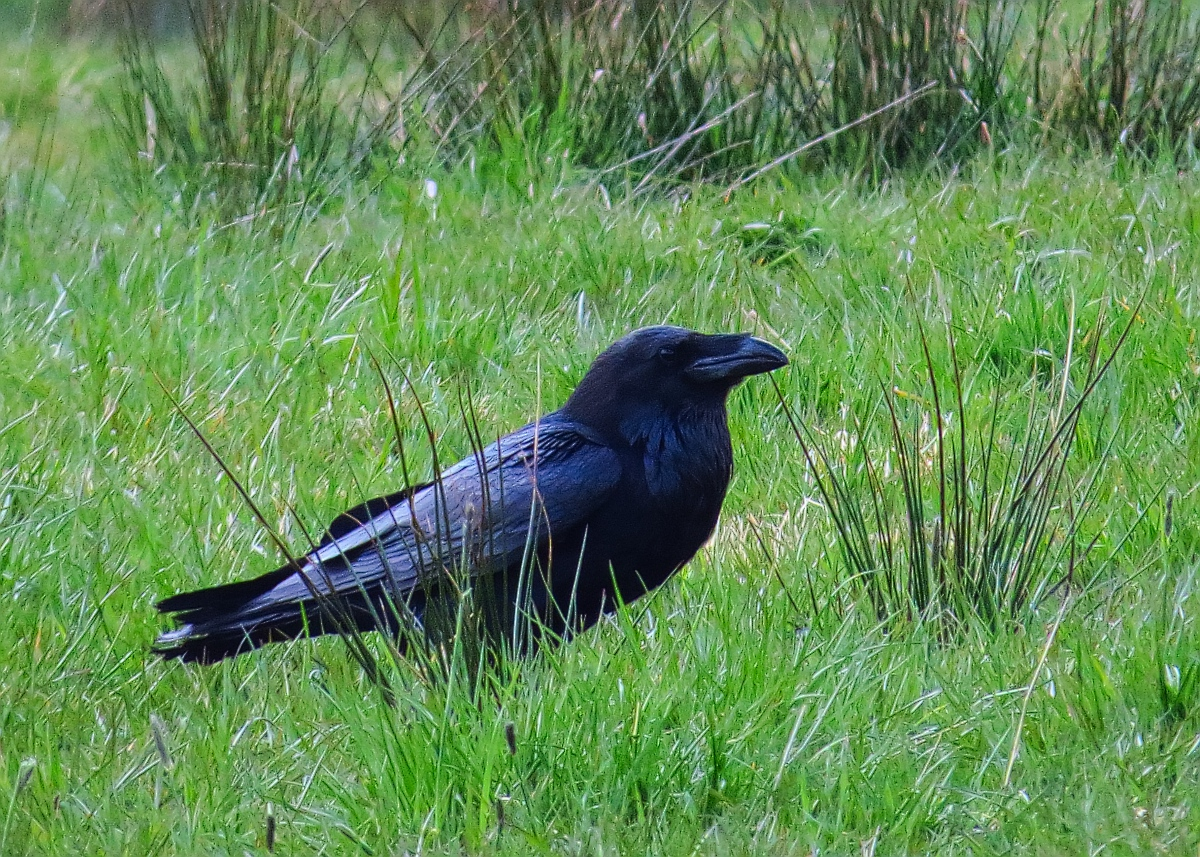
Northern raven, Lindome, Västra Götaland

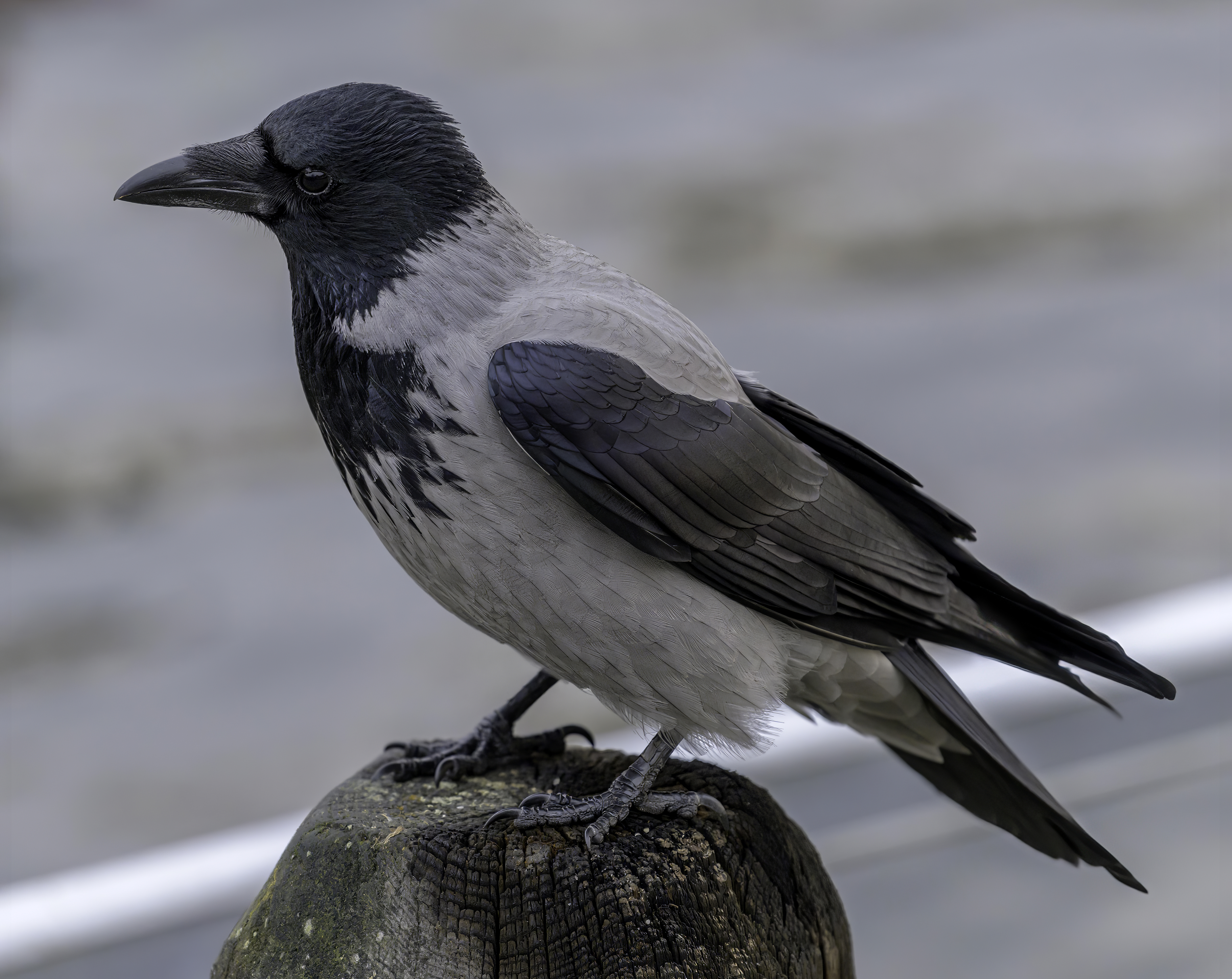
Hooded crow, Vaxholm, Stockholm

== Penduline tits ==
Order: Passeriformes Family: Remizidae

The penduline tits are a group of small passerine birds related to the true tits. They are insectivores.

- Eurasian penduline tit (pungmes) Remiz pendulinus (B)

== Tits, chickadees and titmice ==
Order: Passeriformes Family: Paridae

The Paridae are mainly small stocky woodland species with short stout bills. Some have crests. They are adaptable birds, with a mixed diet including seeds and insects.

- Azure tit (azurmes) Cyanistes cyanus (R)
- Eurasian blue tit (blåmes) Cyanistes caeruleus (B)
- Great tit (talgoxe) Parus major (B)
- Coal tit (svartmes) Periparus ater (B)
- Crested tit (tofsmes) Lophophanes cristatus (B)
- Marsh tit (entita) Poecile palustris (B)
- Willow tit (talltita) Poecile montanus (B)
- Grey-headed chickadee (lappmes) Poecile cinctus (B)
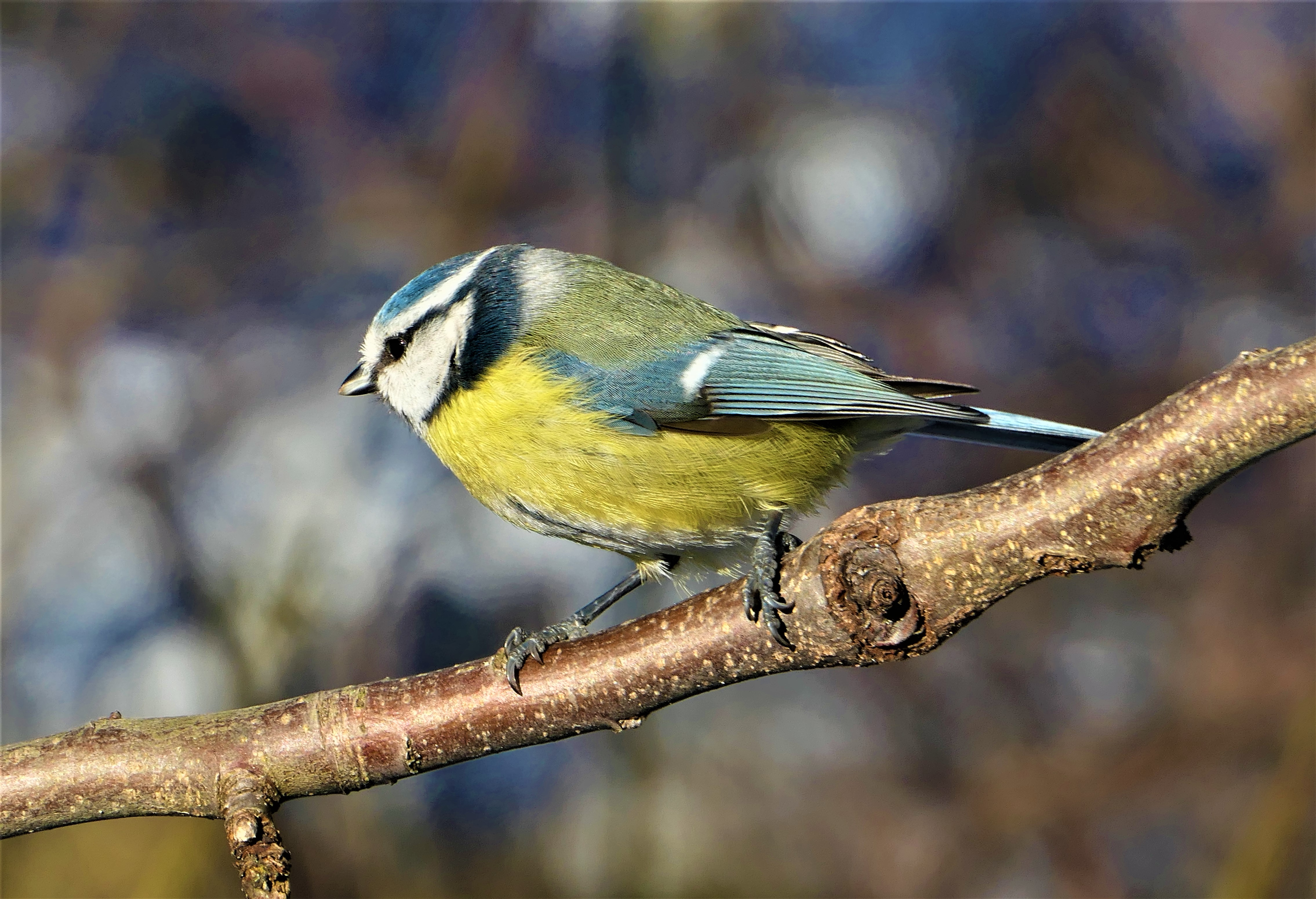
Eurasian blue tit, Värmdö, Stockholm

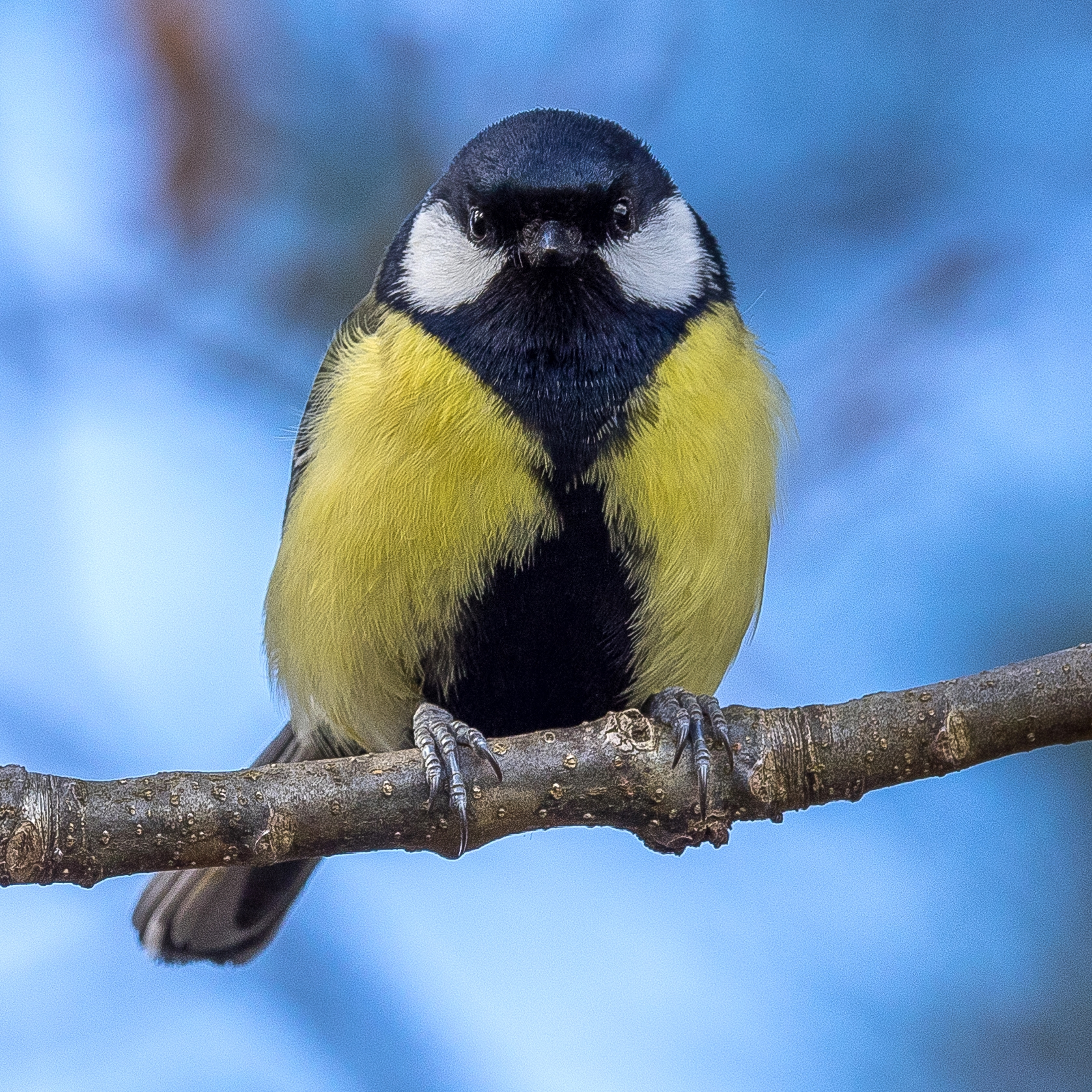
Great tit, Vaxholm, Stockholm

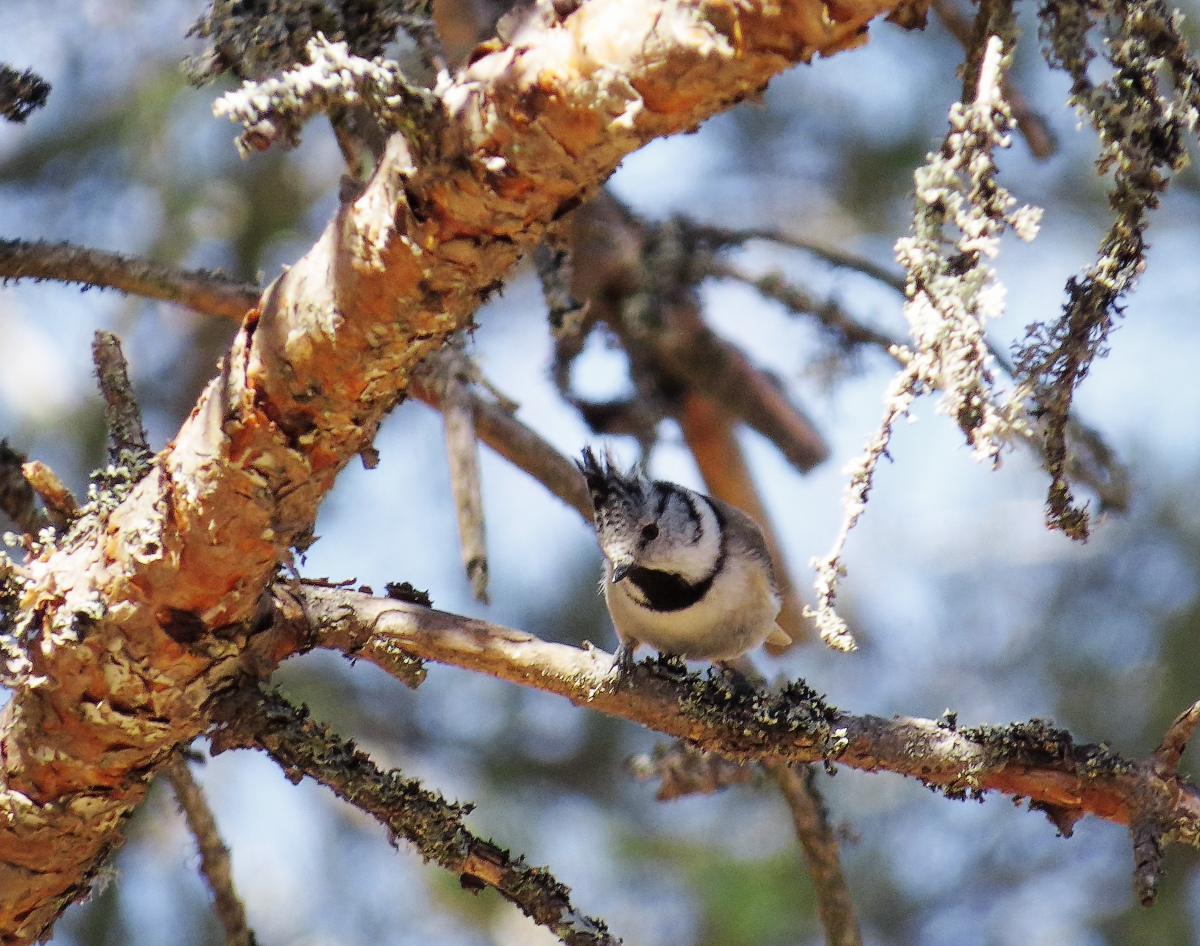
Crested tit, Arvika, Värmlands Län

== Bearded reedling ==
Order: Passeriformes Family: Panuridae

This species, the only one in its family, is found in reed beds throughout temperate Europe and Asia.

- Bearded reedling (skäggmes) Panurus biarmicus (B)
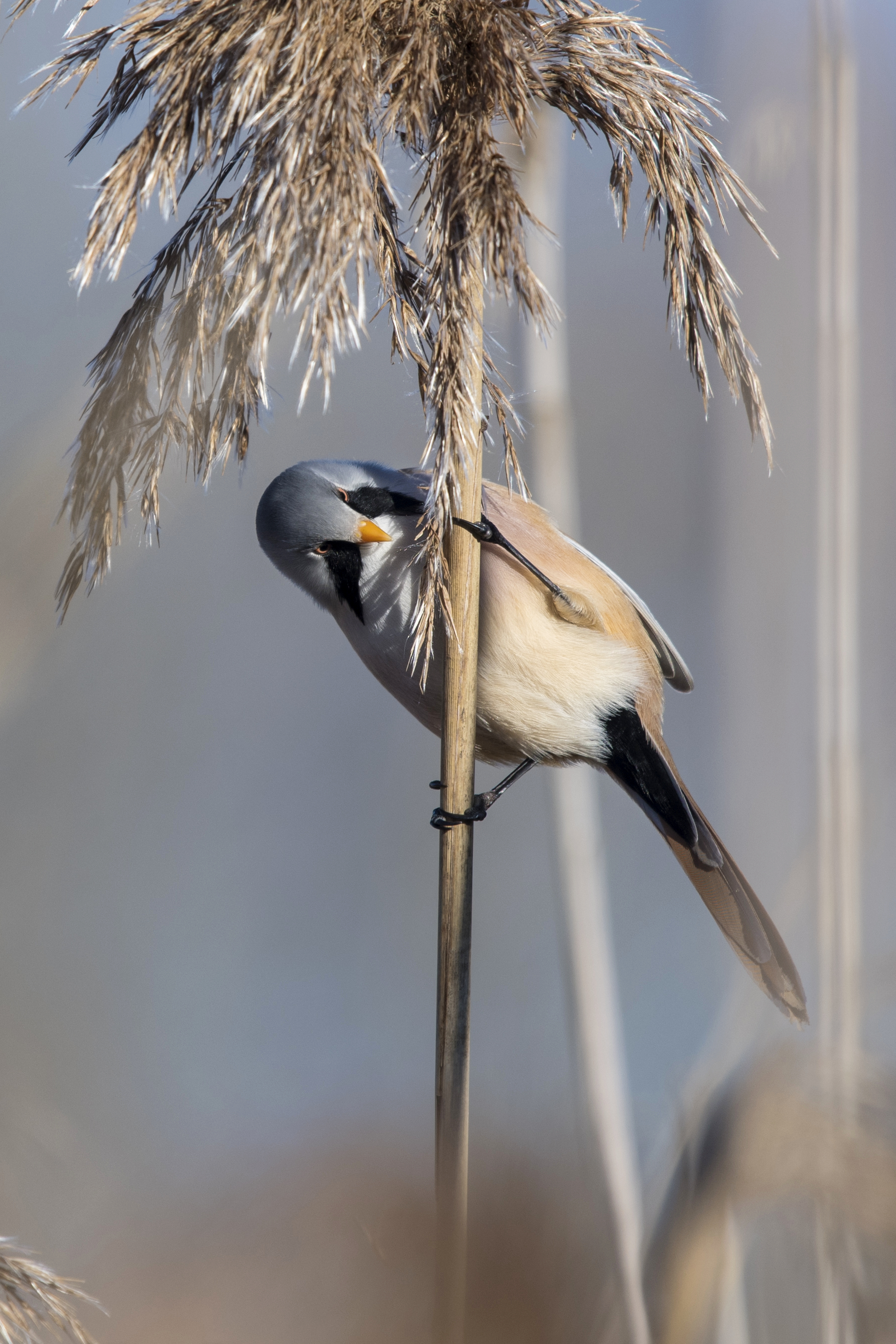
Bearded reedling, Fagersjöviken, Södermanland

== Larks ==
Order: Passeriformes Family: Alaudidae

Larks are small terrestrial birds with often extravagant songs and display flights. Most larks are fairly dull in appearance. Their diets consist of insects and seeds.

- Woodlark (trädlärka) Lullula arborea (B)
- White-winged lark (vitvingad lärka) Alauda leucoptera (R)
- Eurasian skylark (sånglärka) Alauda arvensis (B)
- Crested lark (tofslärka) Galerida cristata (O)
- Horned lark (berglärka) Eremophila alpestris (B)
- Greater short-toed lark (korttålärka) Calandrella brachydactyla (R)
- Bimaculated lark (asiatisk kalanderlärka) Melanocorypha bimaculata (R)
- Black lark (svartlärka) Melanocorypha yeltoniensis (R)
- Calandra lark (kalanderlärka) Melanocorypha calandra (R)
- Turkestan short-toed lark (turkestanlärka) Alaudala heinei (R)
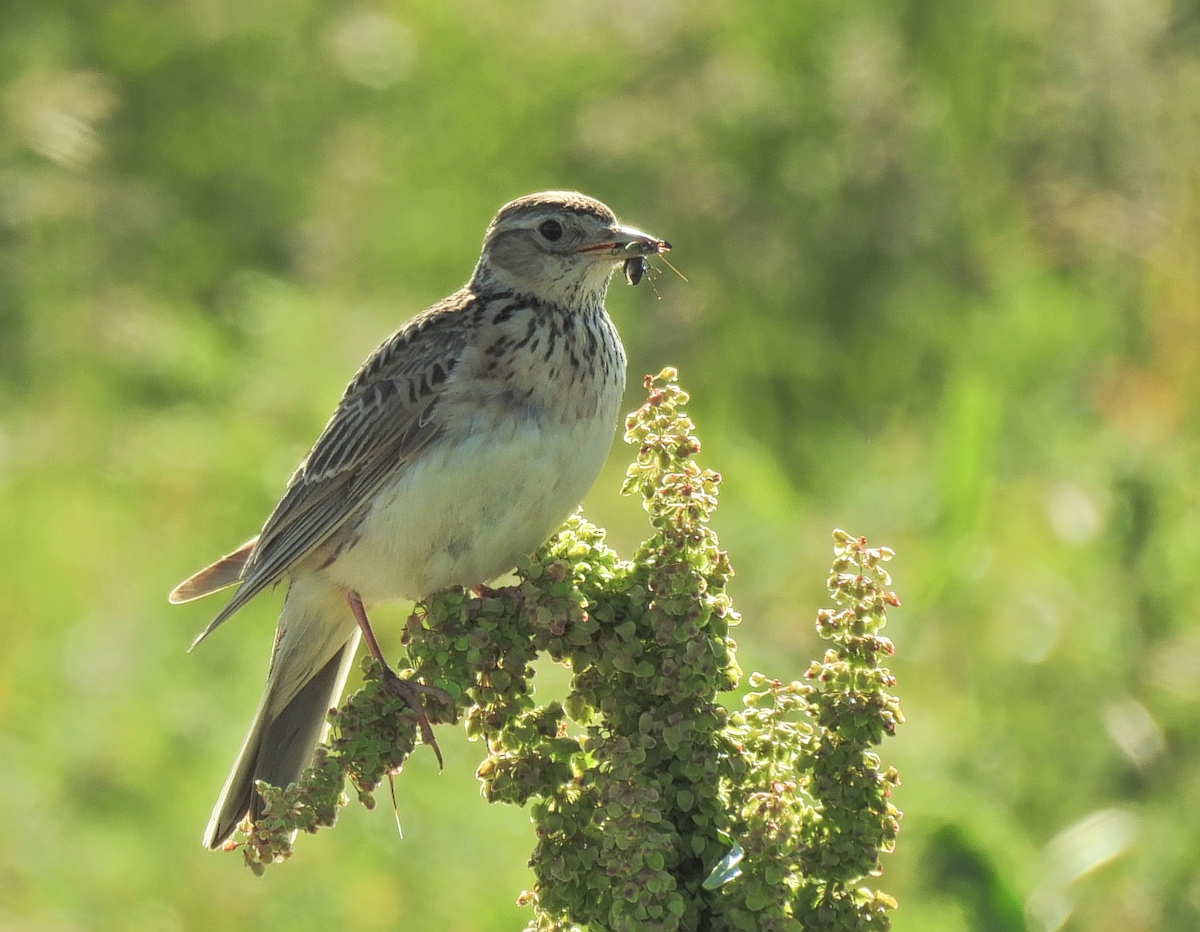
Eurasian skylark, Falkenberg, Halland

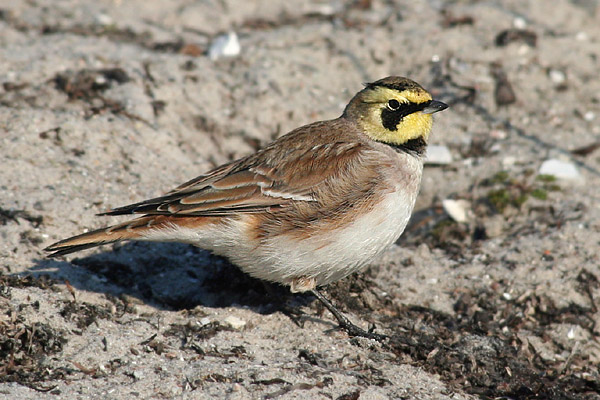
Horned lark, Scania

== Cisticolas and allies ==
Order: Passeriformes Family: Cisticolidae

The Cisticolidae are warblers found mainly in warmer southern regions of the Old World. They are generally very small birds of drab brown or buff appearance found in open country such as grassland or scrub.

- Zitting cisticola (grässångare) Cisticola juncidis (R)

== Reed warblers and allies ==
Order: Passeriformes Family: Acrocephalidae

The members of this family are rather plain olivaceous brown above, but green or grey in a few, and beige to yellow below. Their habitat ranges from wetlands (particularly reedbeds) to open woodland, wet scrub, or tall grass. The family occurs across Eurasia and Africa, but also ranges far into the Pacific.

- Icterine warbler (härmsångare) Hippolais icterina (B)
- Melodious warbler (polyglottsångare) Hippolais polyglotta (R)
- Booted warbler (stäppsångare) Iduna caligata (R)
- Sykes's warbler (saxaulsångare) Iduna rama (R)
- Eastern olivaceous warbler (eksångare) Iduna pallida (R)
- Western olivaceous warbler (macchiasångare) Iduna opaca (R)
- Sedge warbler (sävsångare) Acrocephalus schoenobaenus (B)
- Aquatic warbler (vattensångare) Acrocephalus paludicola (R)
- Moustached warbler (kaveldunsångare) Acrocephalus melanopogon (R)
- Paddyfield warbler (fältsångare) Acrocephalus agricola (R)
- Blyth's reed warbler (busksångare) Acrocephalus dumetorum (B)
- Marsh warbler (kärrsångare) Acrocephalus palustris (B)
- Common reed warbler (rörsångare) Acrocephalus scirpaceus (B)
- Great reed warbler (trastsångare) Acrocephalus arundinaceus (B)
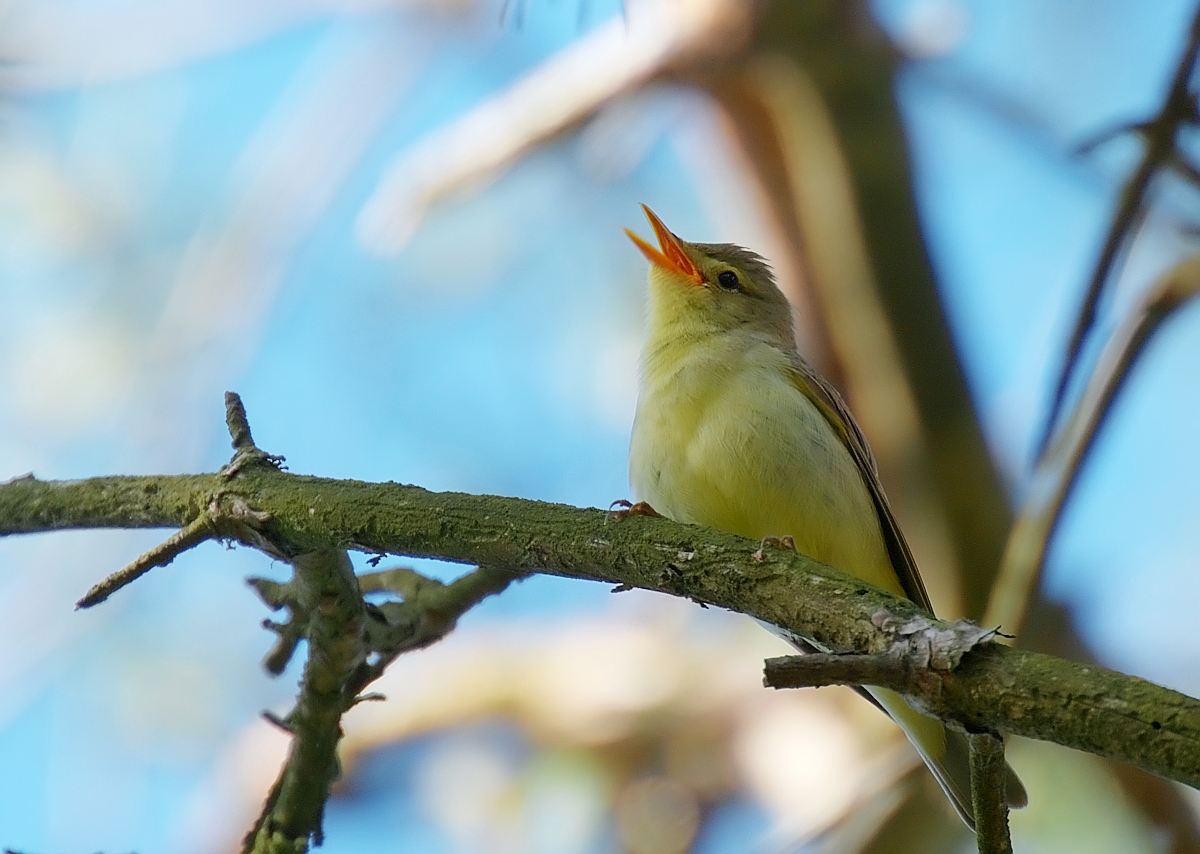
Icterine warbler, Petgardetrask, Öland

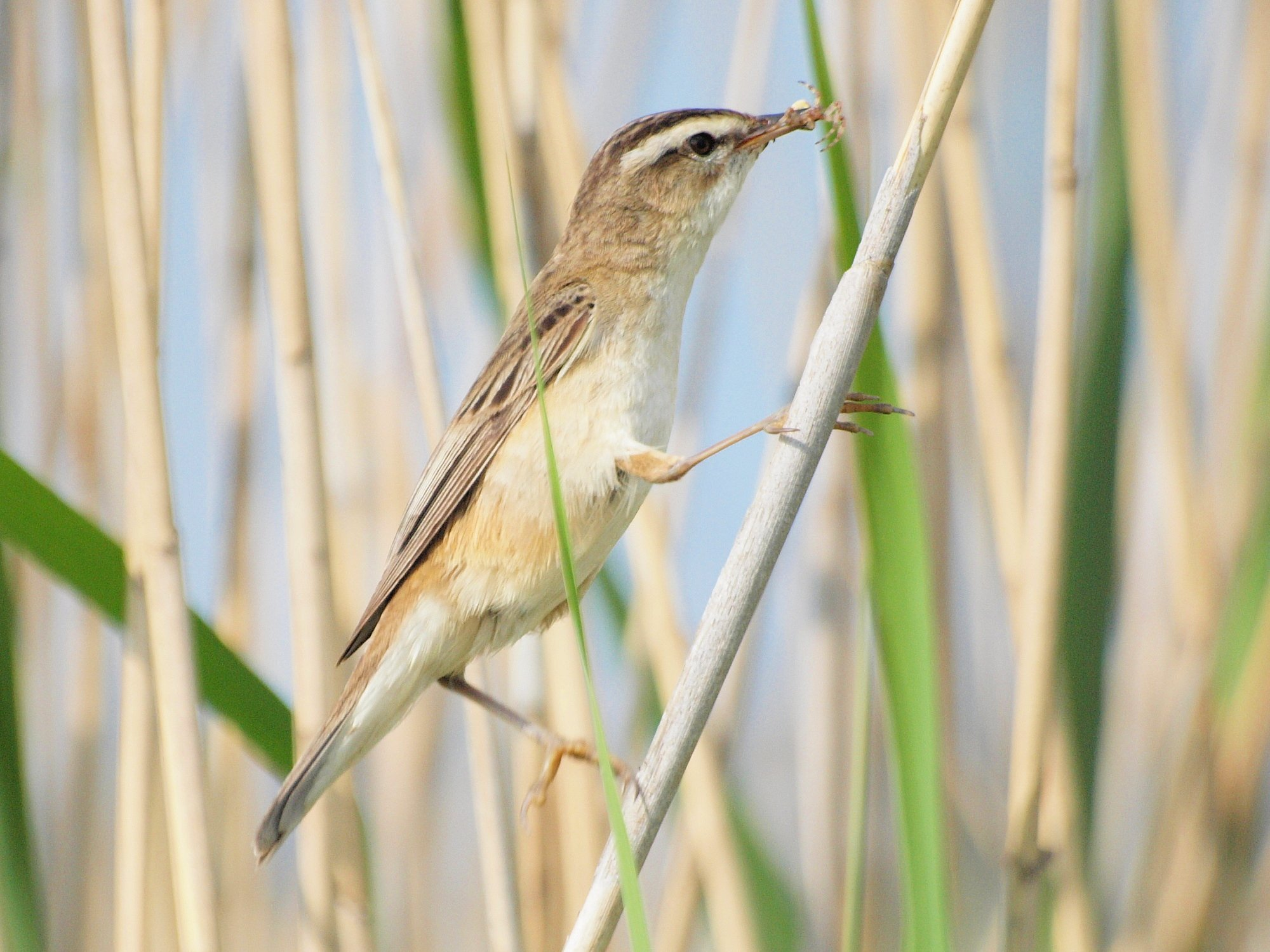
Sedge warbler, Hallsberg, Örebro

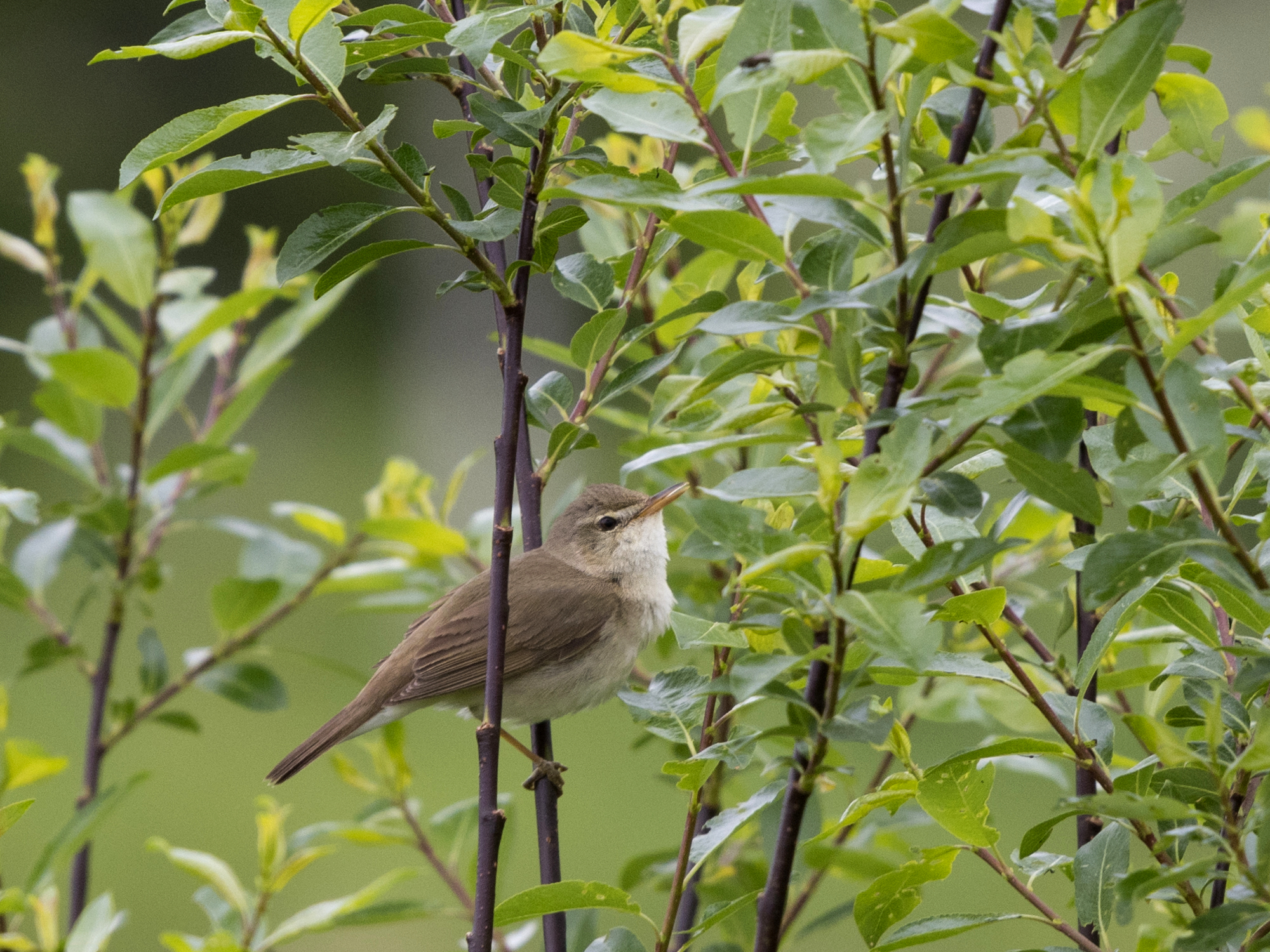
Blyth's reed warbler, Ytterberg, Härjedalen

== Grassbirds and allies ==
Order: Passeriformes Family: Locustellidae

Locustellidae are a family of small insectivorous songbirds found mainly in Eurasia, Africa, and the Australian region. They are mostly smallish birds with tails that are usually long and broad with a rounded to pointed end, and tend to be well-camouflaged brownish above and buffy below. They mostly occur in dense wet grassland with scattered bushes.

- Pallas's grasshopper warbler (starrsångare) Helopsaltes certhiola (R)
- Lanceolated warbler (träsksångare) Locustella lanceolata (R)
- River warbler (flodsångare) Locustella fluviatilis (B)
- Savi's warbler (vassångare) Locustella luscinioides (B)
- Common grasshopper warbler (gräshoppsångare) Locustella naevia (B)
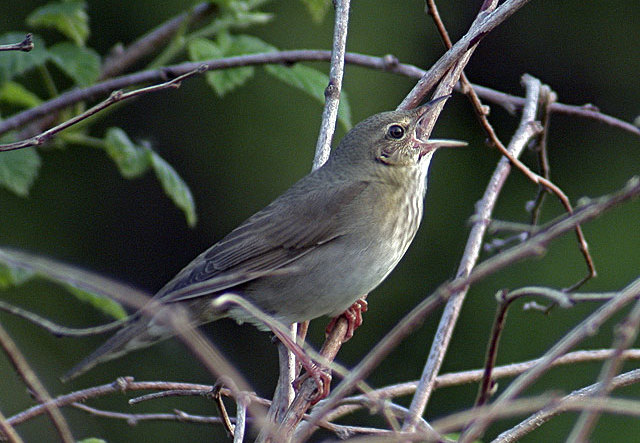
River warbler, Horred, Västergötland

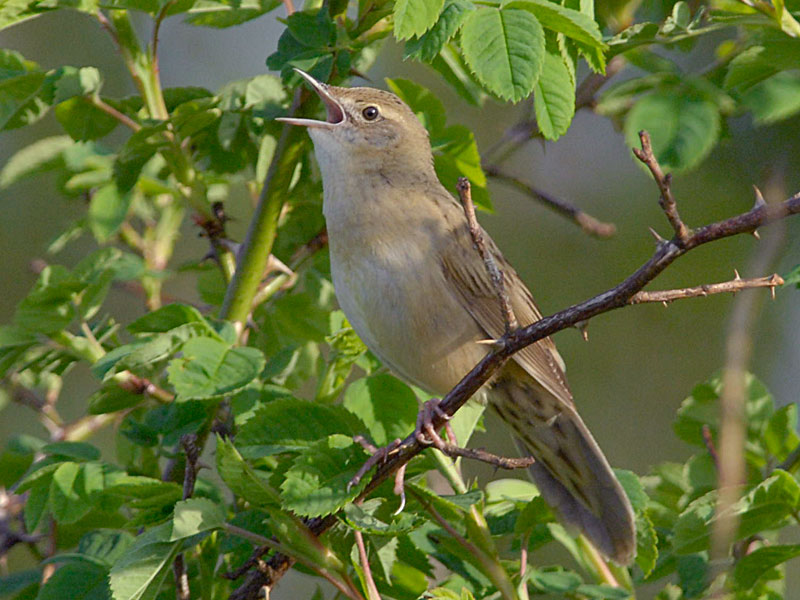
Common grasshopper warbler, Getteröns naturreservat, Varberg, Halland

== Swallows ==
Order: Passeriformes Family: Hirundinidae

The family Hirundinidae is adapted to aerial feeding. They have a slender streamlined body, long pointed wings, and a short bill with a wide gape. The feet are adapted to perching rather than walking, and the front toes are partially joined at the base.

- Sand martin (backsvala) Riparia riparia (B)
- Eurasian crag martin (klippsvala) Ptyonoprogne rupestris (R)
- Barn swallow (ladusvala) Hirundo rustica (B)
- Western house martin (hussvala) Delichon urbicum (B)
- European red-rumped swallow (rostgumpsvala) Cecropis rufula (O)
- Eastern red-rumped swallow (tempelsvala) Cecropis daurica (R)
- American cliff swallow (stensvala) Petrochelidon pyrrhonota (R)
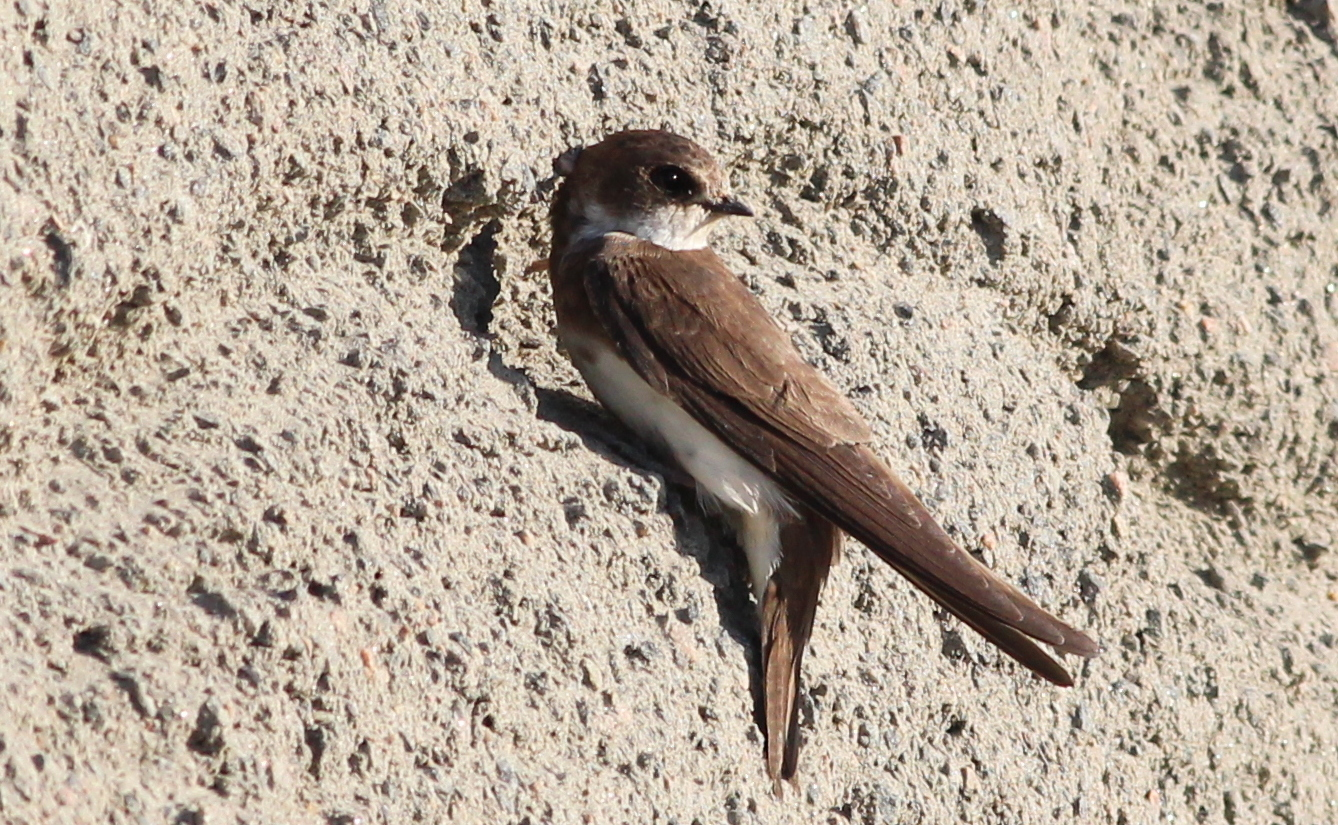
Sand martin, Getterön, Varberg

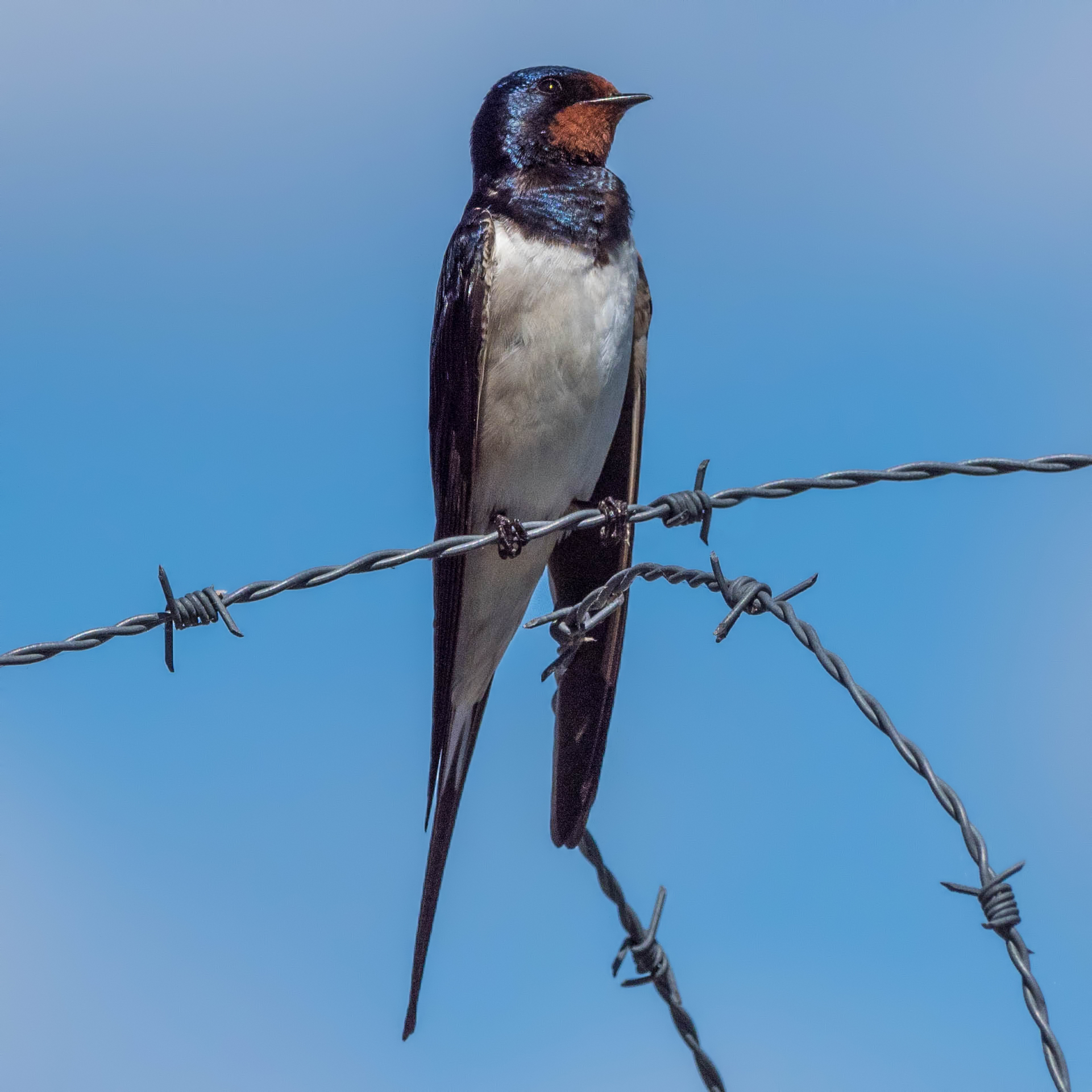
Barn swallow, Vaxholm, Stockholm

== Long-tailed tits and bushtits ==
Order: Passeriformes Family: Aegithalidae

Long-tailed tits are a group of small passerine birds with medium to long tails. They make woven bag nests in trees. Most eat a mixed diet which includes insects.

- Long-tailed tit (stjärtmes) Aegithalos caudatus (B)
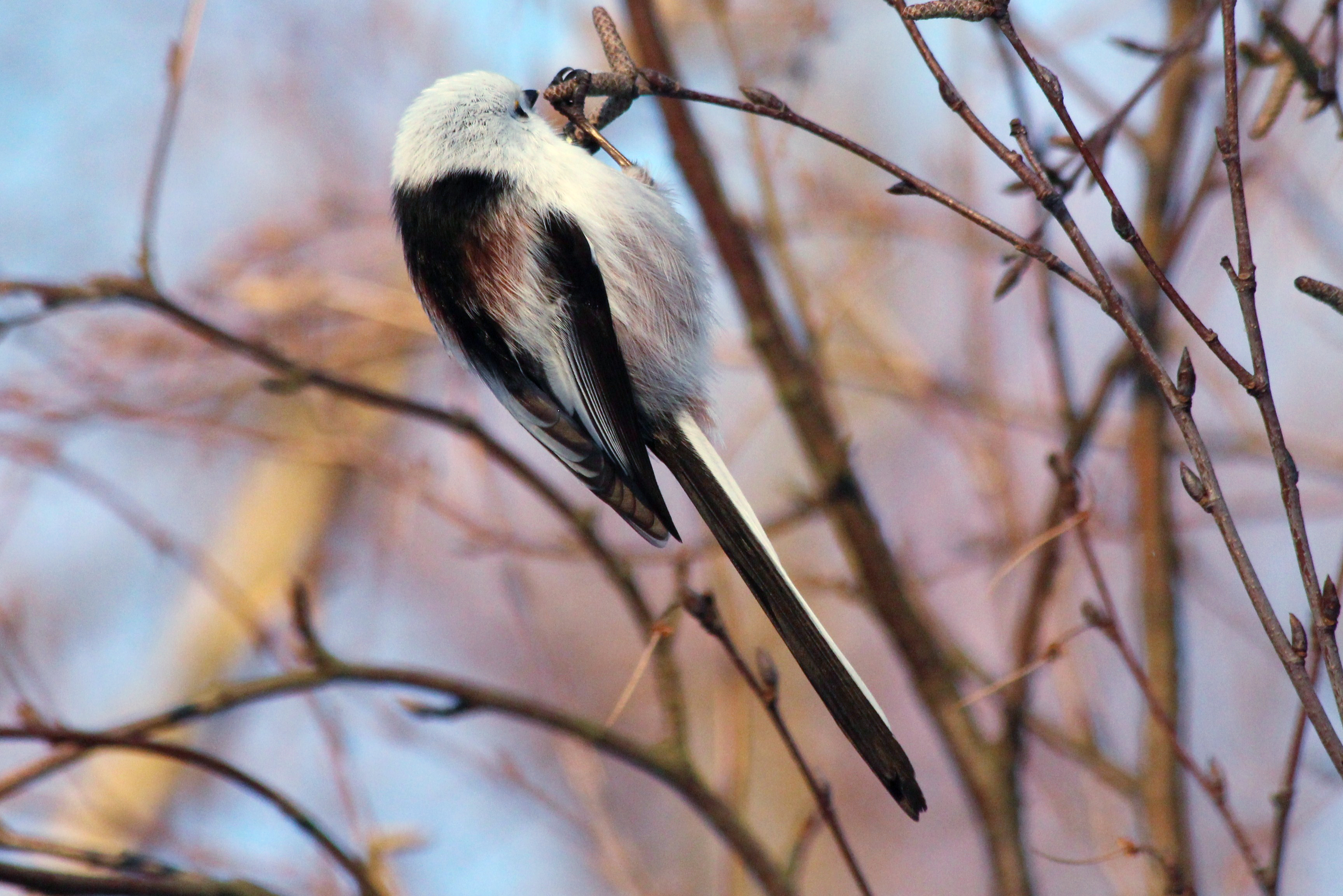
Long-tailed tit, Gothenburg

== Bush warblers and allies ==
Order: Passeriformes Family: Cettiidae

The members of this family are found across southern and western Europe, Africa, Asia, and Polynesia.

- Cetti's warbler (sumpcettia) Cettia cetti (R)

== Leaf warblers ==
Order: Passeriformes Family: Phylloscopidae

Leaf warblers are a family of small insectivorous birds found mostly in Eurasia and ranging into Wallacea and Africa. The species are often green-plumaged above and white or yellow below, or more subdued with buffy-green to greyish-green colours.

- Wood warbler (grönsångare) Phylloscopus sibilatrix (B)
- Western Bonelli's warbler (bergsångare) Phylloscopus bonelli (R)
- Eastern Bonelli's warbler (balkansångare) Phylloscopus orientalis (R)
- Yellow-browed warbler (tajgasångare) Phylloscopus inornatus (O)
- Hume's warbler (bergtajgasångare) Phylloscopus humei (O)
- Pallas's leaf warbler (kungsfågelsångare) Phylloscopus proregulus (O)
- Radde's warbler (videsångare) Phylloscopus schwarzi (O)
- Dusky warbler (brunsångare) Phylloscopus fuscatus (O)
- Plain leaf warbler (dvärgsångare) Phylloscopus neglectus (R)
- Willow warbler (lövsångare) Phylloscopus trochilus (B)
- Iberian chiffchaff (iberisk gransångare) Phylloscopus ibericus (R)
- Common chiffchaff (gransångare) Phylloscopus collybita (B)
- Eastern crowned warbler (östlig kronsångare) Phylloscopus coronatus (R)
- Green warbler (kaukasisk lundsångare) Phylloscopus nitidus (R)
- Two-barred warbler (sibirisk lundsångare) Phylloscopus plumbeitarsus (R)
- Greenish warbler (lundsångare) Phylloscopus trochiloides (B)
- Arctic warbler (nordsångare) Phylloscopus borealis (B)
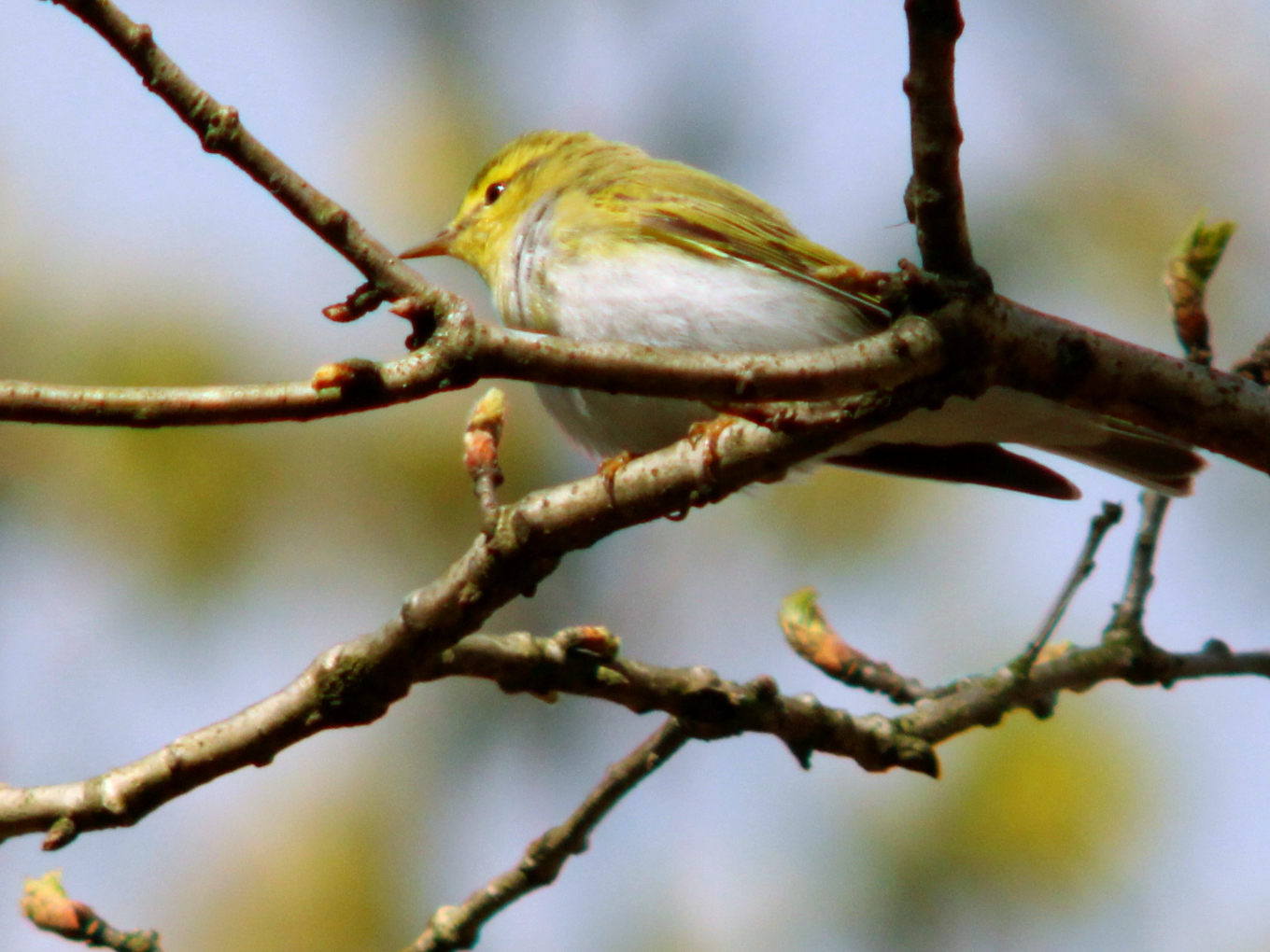
Wood warbler, Slottsskogen, Gothenburg

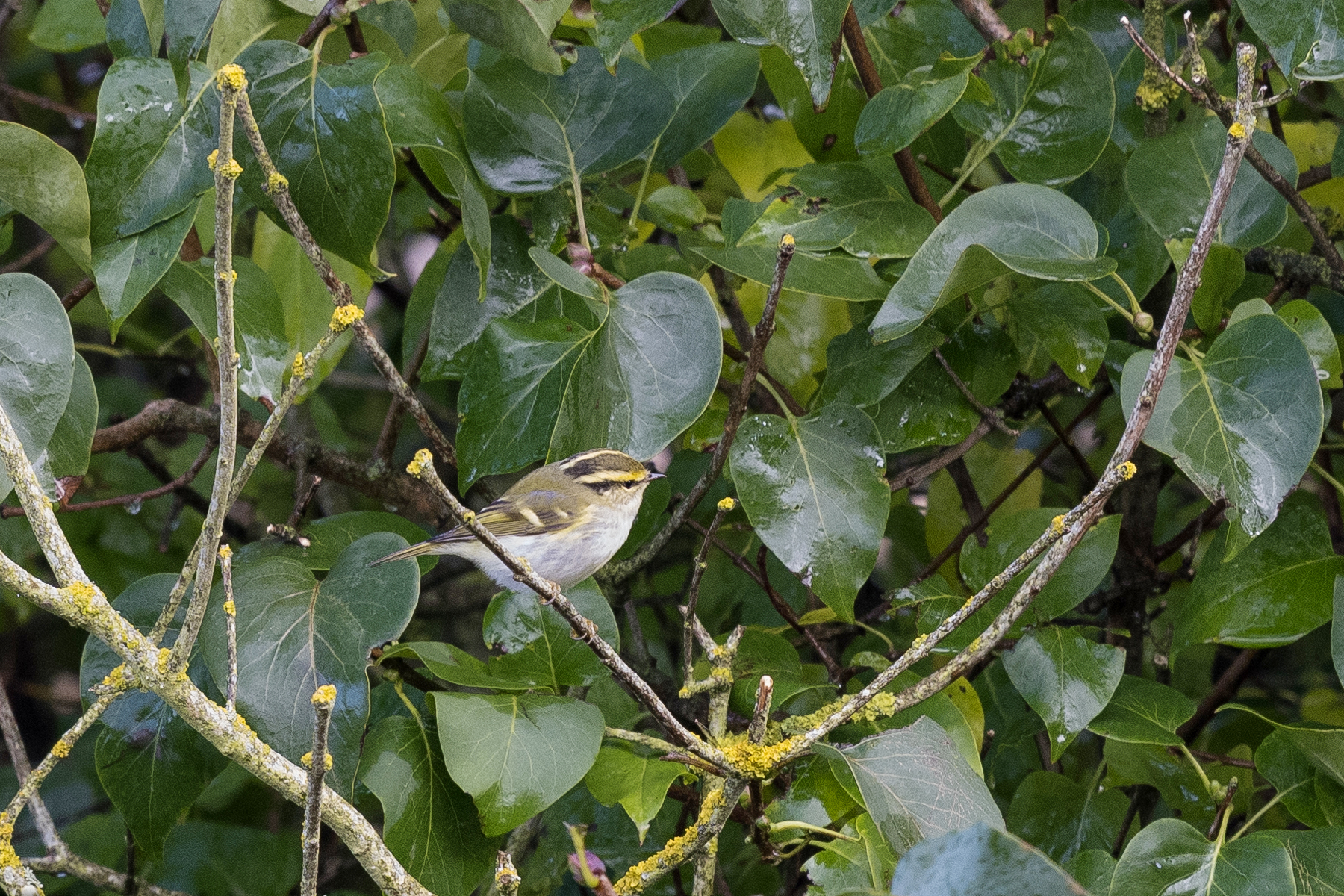
Pallas's leaf warbler, Torngård, Öland

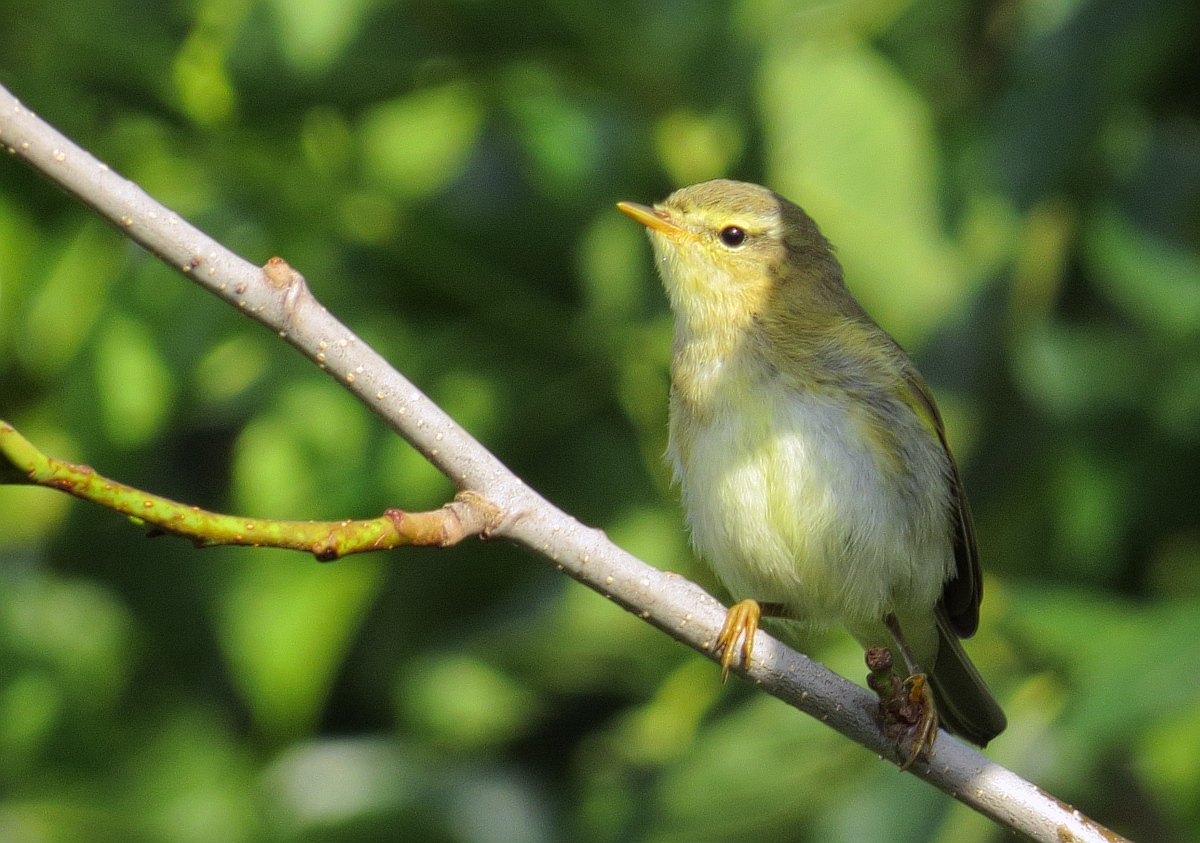
Willow warbler, Lake Hornborga, Västergötland

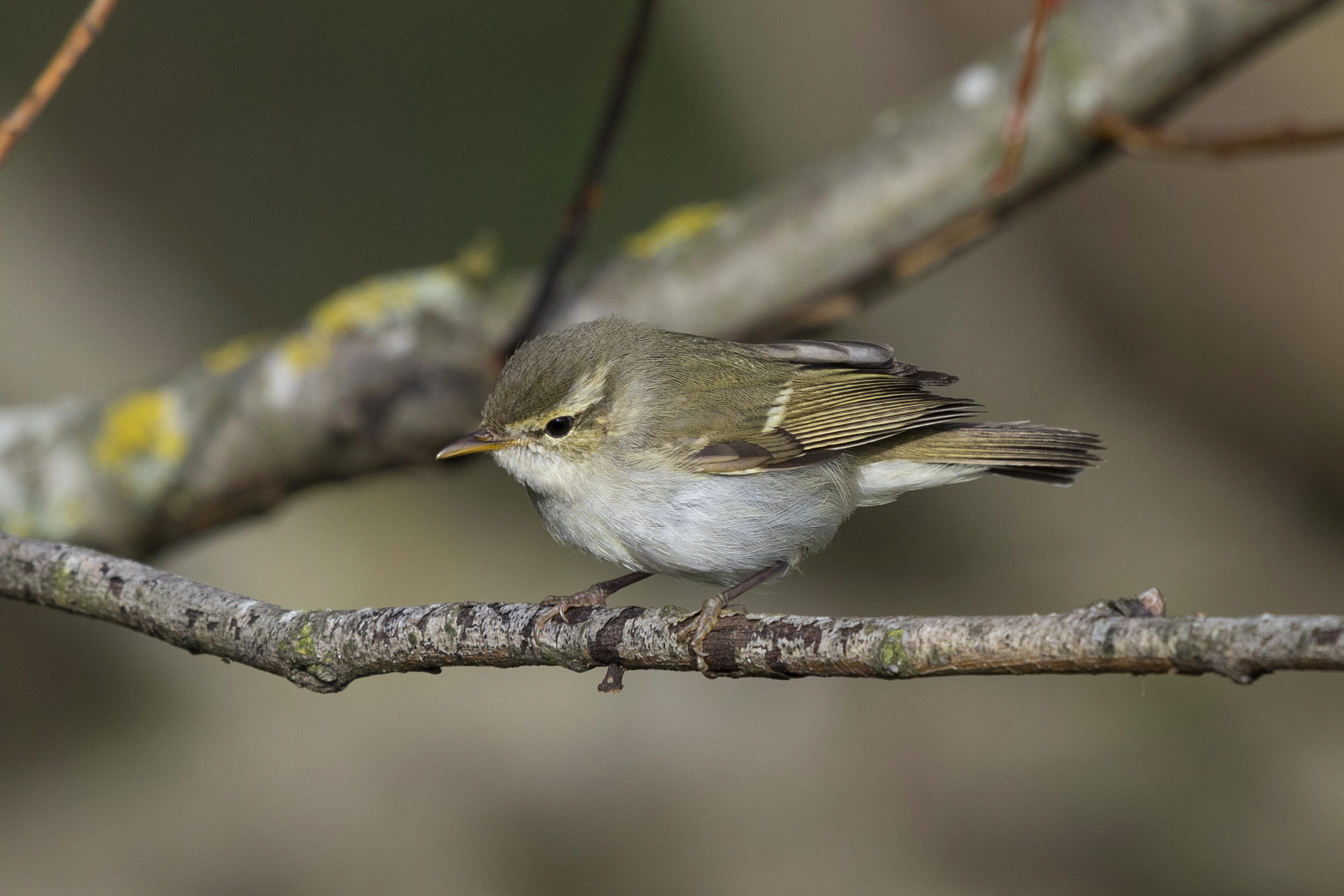
Two-barred warbler, Hulterstad, Öland

== Sylviid warblers, parrotbills, and allies ==
Order: Passeriformes Family: Sylviidae

The family Sylviidae is a group of small insectivorous birds. They mainly occur as breeding species, as another common name (Old World warblers) implies, in Europe, Asia and, to a lesser extent, Africa. Most are of generally undistinguished appearance, but many have distinctive songs.

- Garden warbler (trädgårdssångare) Sylvia borin (B)
- Eurasian blackcap (svarthätta) Sylvia atricapilla (B)
- Barred warbler (höksångare) Curruca nisoria (B)
- Lesser whitethroat (ärtsångare) Curruca curruca (B)
- Asian desert warbler (ökensångare) Curruca nana (R)
- Common whitethroat (törnsångare) Curruca communis (B)
- Dartford warbler (provencesångare) Curruca undata (R)
- Sardinian warbler (sammetshätta) Curruca melanocephala (R)
- Moltoni's warbler (rosensångare) Curruca subalpina (R)
- Western subalpine warbler (rostsångare) Curruca iberiae (R)
- Eastern subalpine warbler (rödstrupig sångare) Curruca cantillans (R)
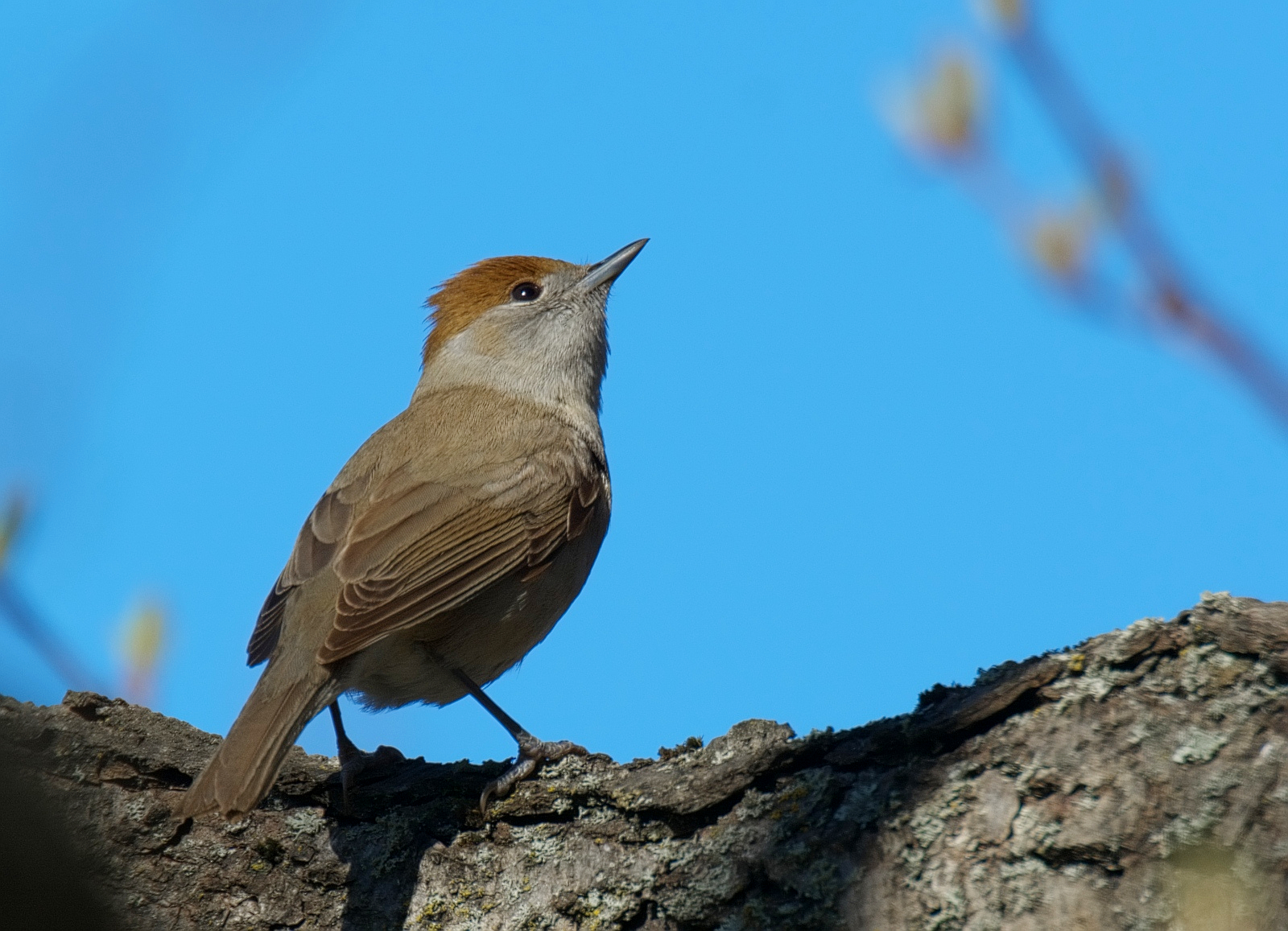
Eurasian blackcap (female), Slottsskogen, Gothenburg

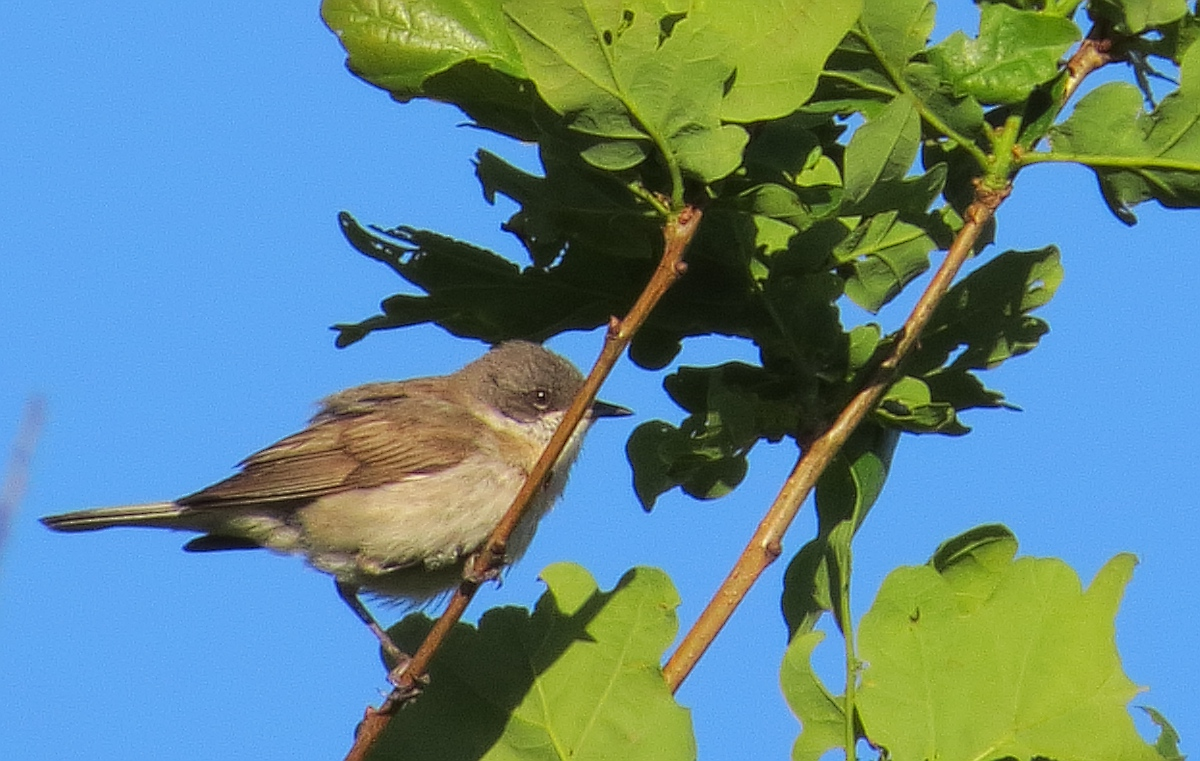
Lesser whitethroat, Getterön, Varberg, Halland

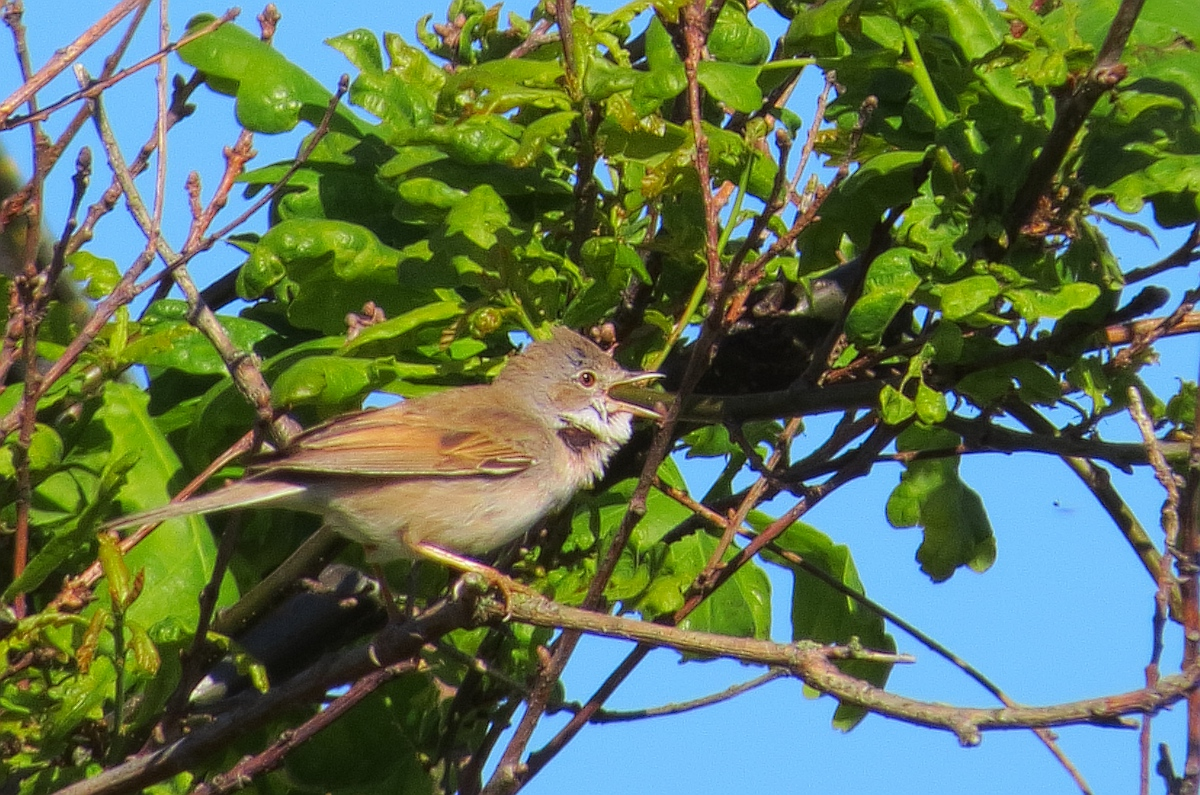
Common whitethroat, Falkenberg, Halland

== Waxwings ==
Order: Passeriformes Family: Bombycillidae

The waxwings are a group of birds with soft silky plumage and unique red tips to the secondary feathers of the wing. These tips look like sealing wax and give the group its name. These are arboreal birds of northern forests. They live on insects in summer and berries in winter.

- Bohemian waxwing (sidensvans) Bombycilla garrulus (B)
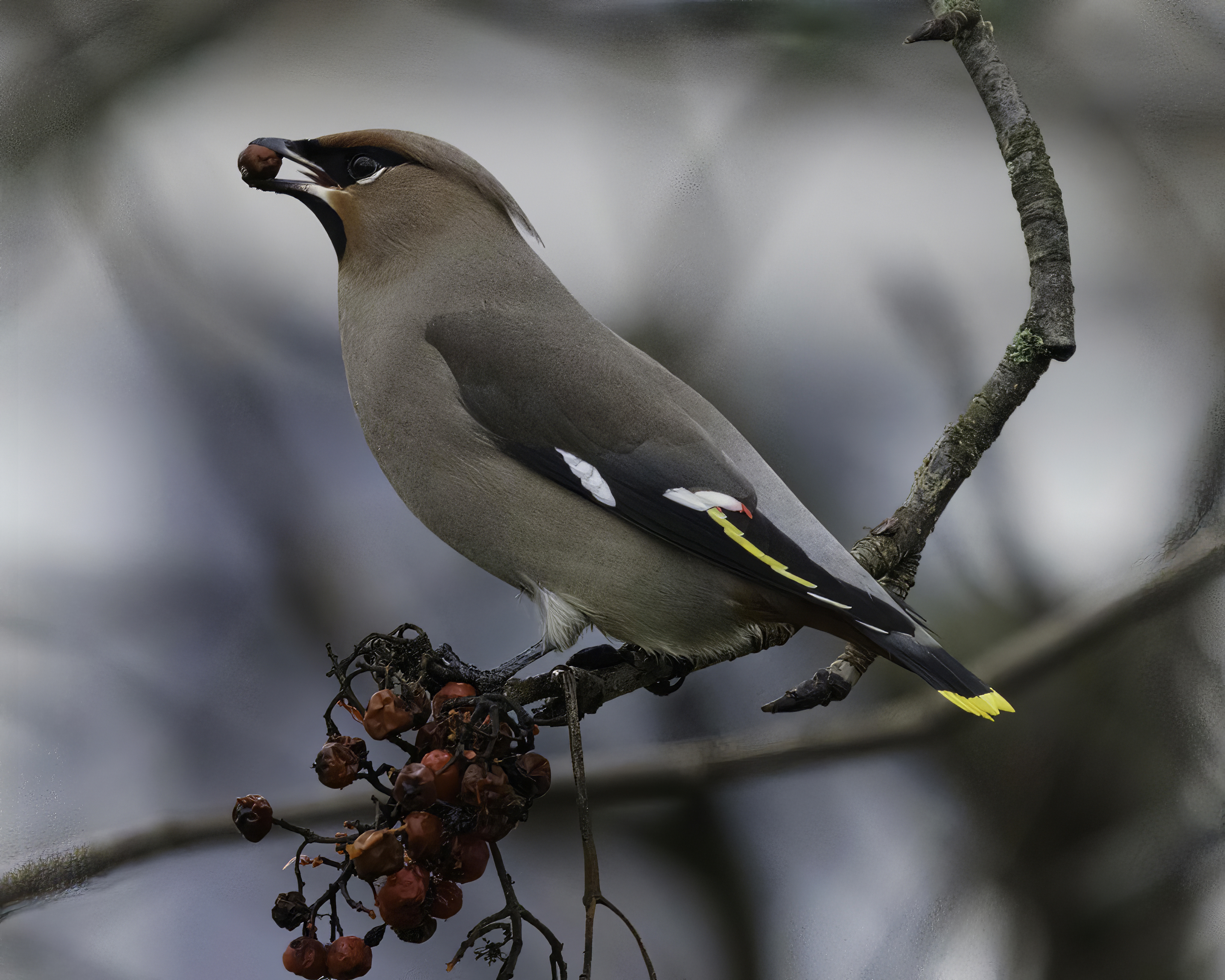
Bohemian waxwing, Vaxholm, Stockholm

== Crests and kinglets ==
Order: Passeriformes Family: Regulidae

The crests and kinglets are a small family of birds which superficially resemble leaf warblers but are not closely related. They are very small insectivorous birds in the single genus Regulus. The adults have coloured crowns, giving rise to their name.

- Common firecrest (brandkronad kungsfågel) Regulus ignicapilla (B)
- Goldcrest (kungsfågel) Regulus regulus (B)
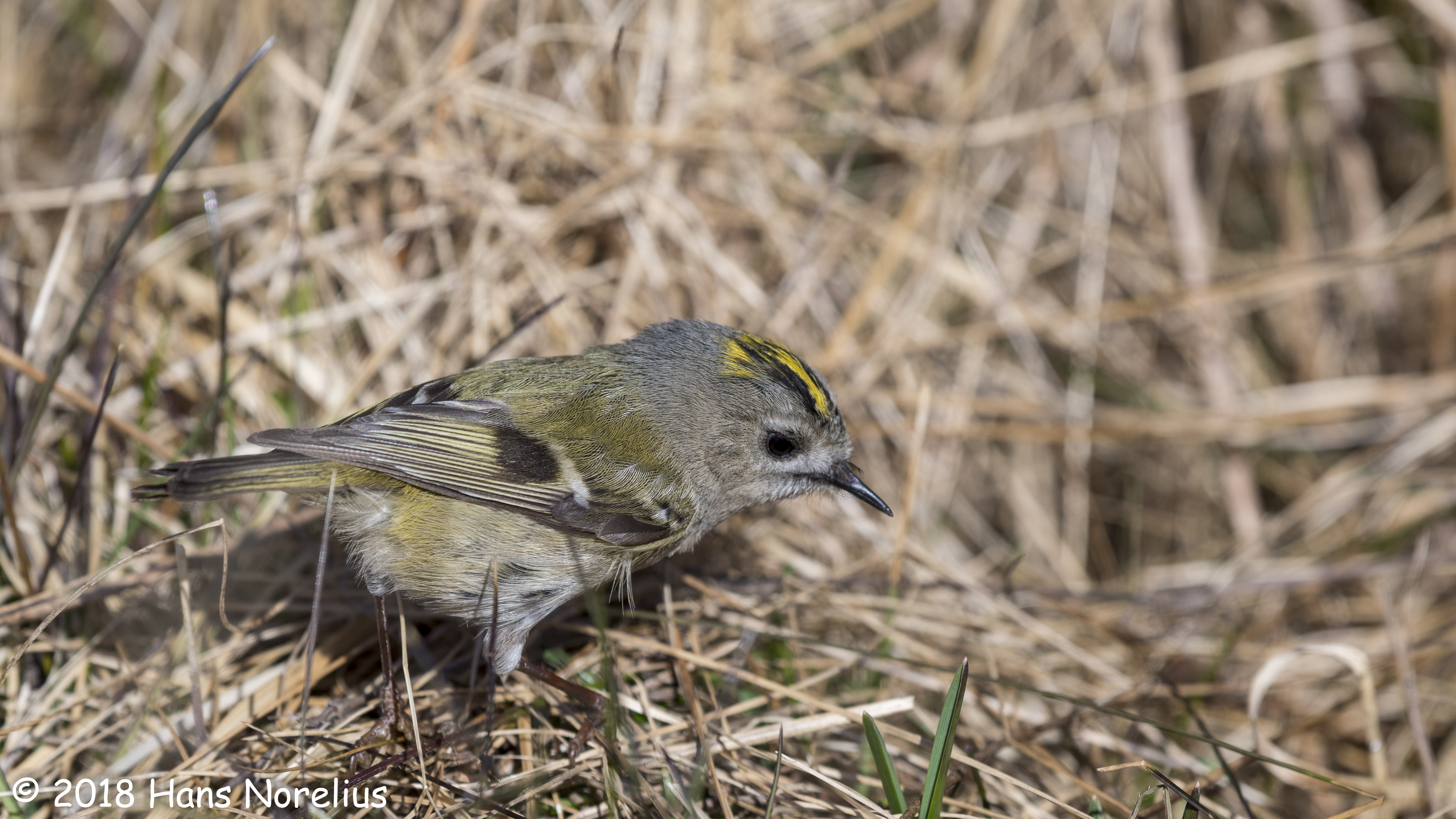
Goldcrest, Landsort, Södermanland

== Nuthatches ==
Order: Passeriformes Family: Sittidae

Nuthatches are small woodland birds. They have the unusual ability to climb down trees head first, unlike other tree-climbing birds which usually only go upwards. Nuthatches have large heads, short tails, and strong bills and feet.

- Eurasian nuthatch (nötväcka) Sitta europaea (B)
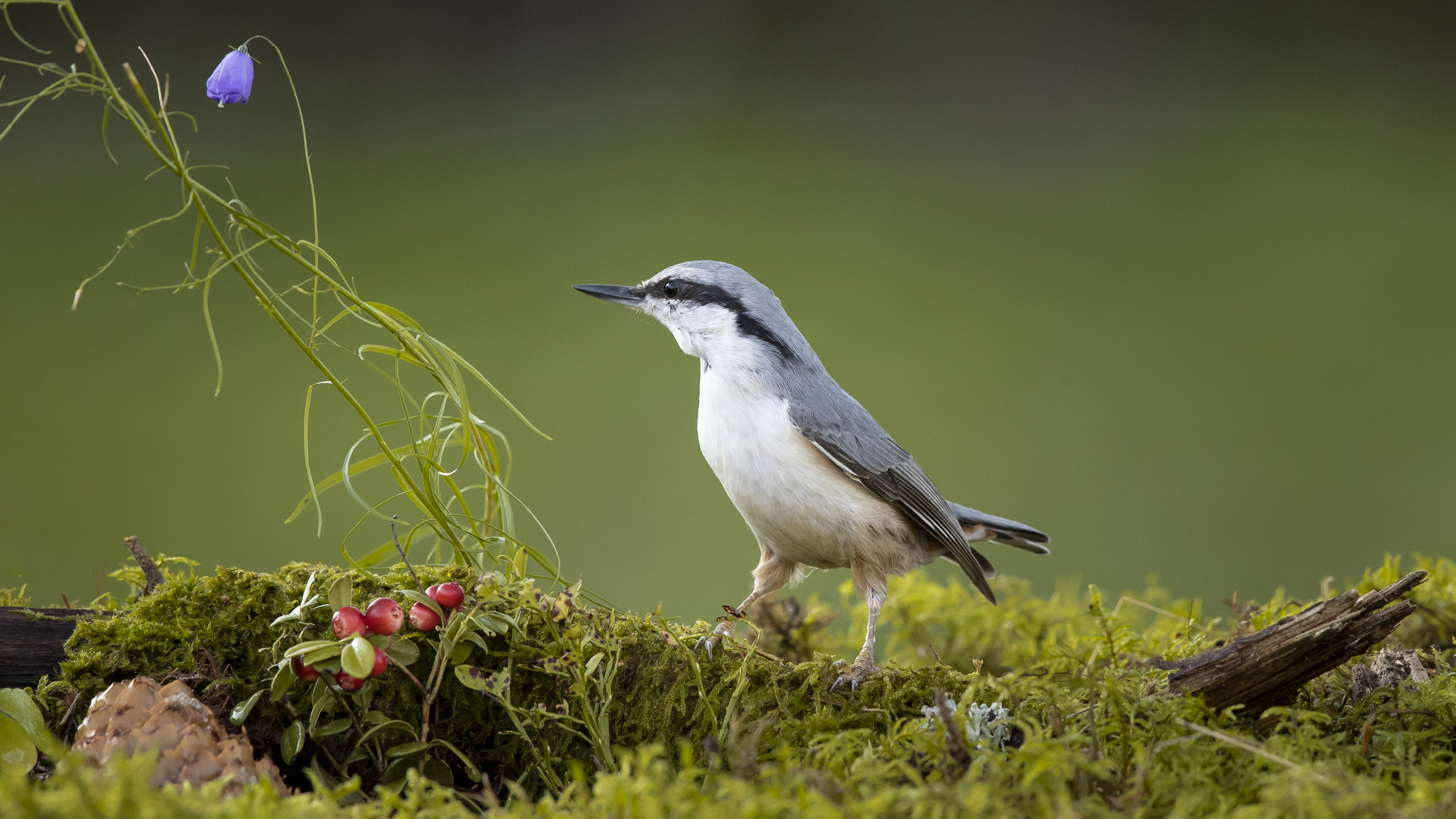
Eurasian nuthatch, Habbestorp, Småland

== Treecreepers ==
Order: Passeriformes Family: Certhiidae

Treecreepers are small woodland birds, brown above and white below. They have thin pointed down-curved bills, which they use to extricate insects from bark. They have stiff tail feathers, like woodpeckers, which they use to support themselves on vertical trees.

- Eurasian treecreeper (trädkrypare) Certhia familiaris (B)
- Short-toed treecreeper (trädgårdsträdkrypare) Certhia brachydactyla (B)
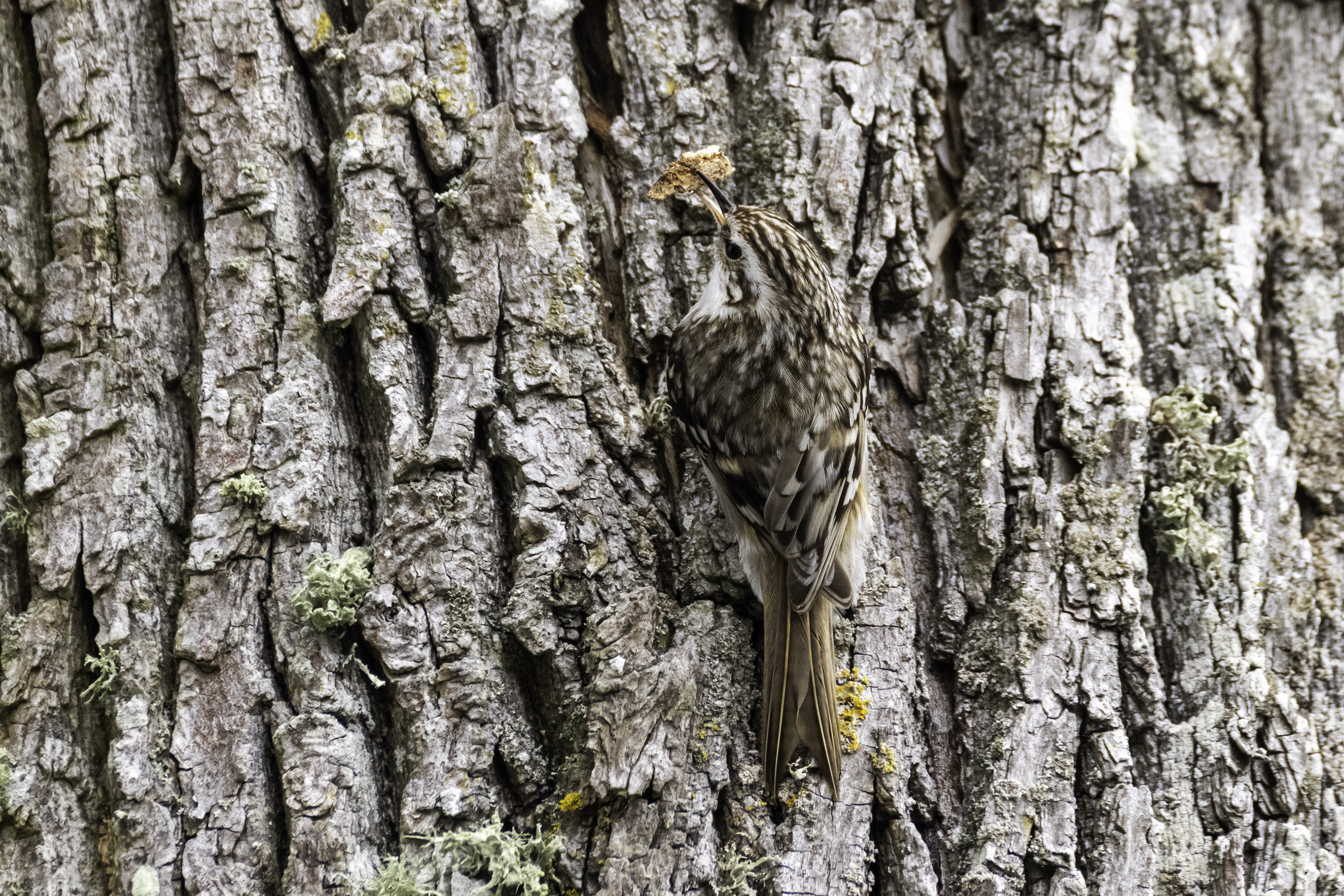
Eurasian treecreeper, Roma, Gotland

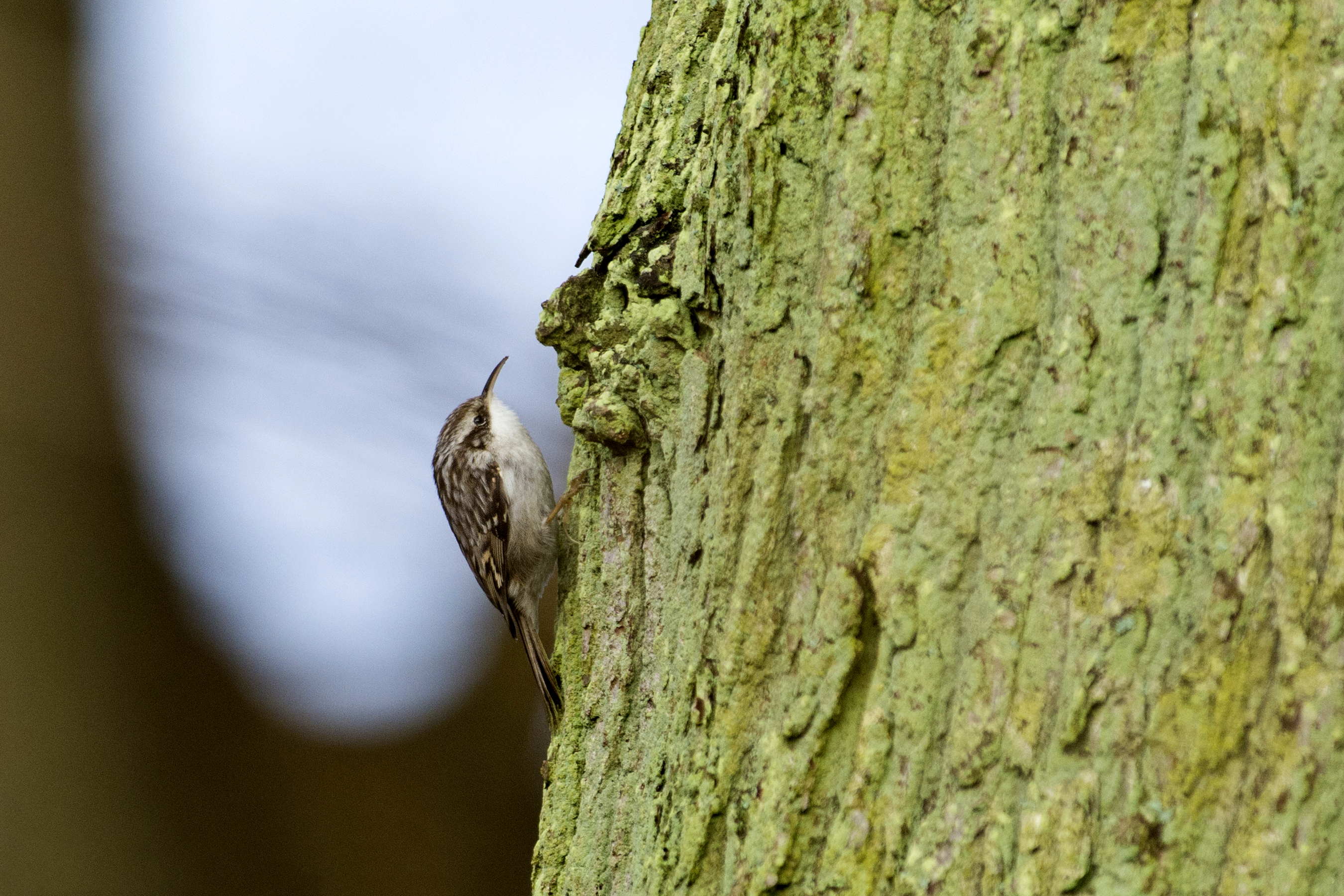
Short-toed treecreeper, Sofiero, Scania - a new colonist in the far southwest of Sweden

== Wrens ==
Order: Passeriformes Family: Troglodytidae

The wrens are mainly small and inconspicuous except for their loud songs. These birds have short wings and thin down-turned bills. Several species often hold their tails upright. All are insectivorous.

- Eurasian wren (gärdsmyg) Troglodytes troglodytes (B)
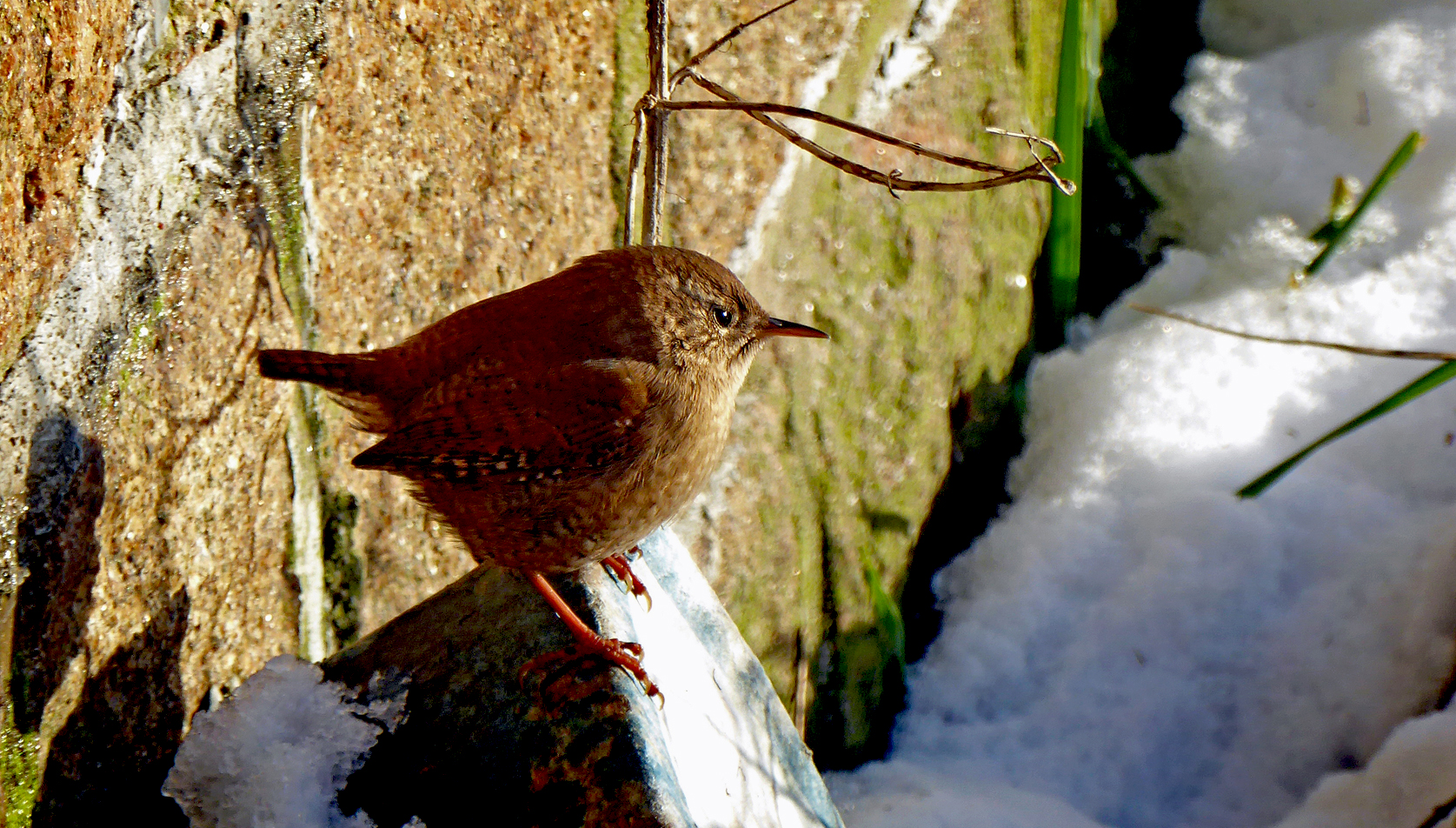
Eurasian wren, Ystad, Scania

== Starlings ==
Order: Passeriformes Family: Sturnidae

Starlings are medium-sized passerine birds. Their flight is strong and direct and they are very gregarious. Their preferred habitat is fairly open country. They eat insects and fruit. Their plumage is varied, but often with a metallic sheen.

- Common starling (stare) Sturnus vulgaris (B)
- Rosy starling (rosenstare) Pastor roseus (O)
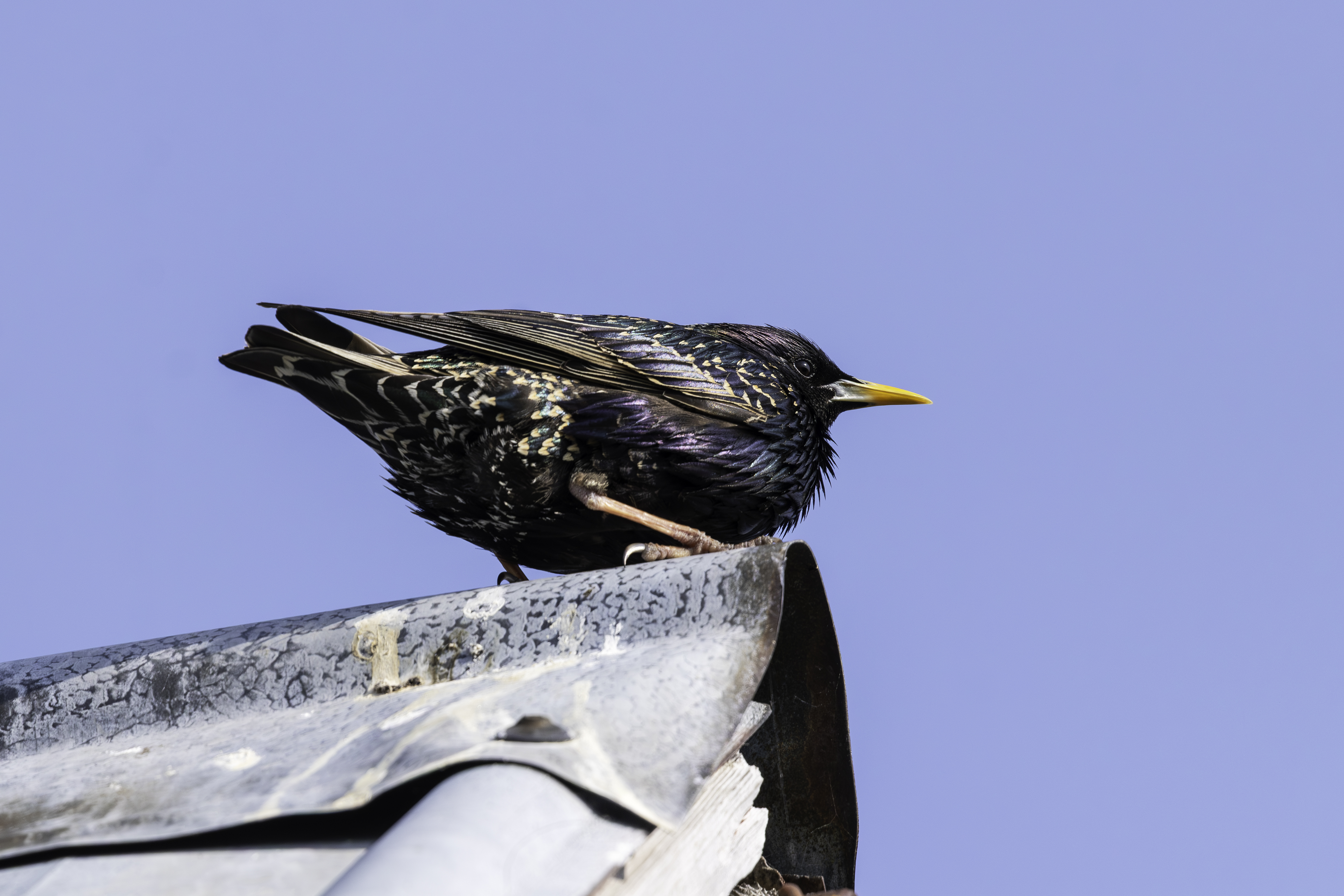
Common starling, Sysne, Gotland

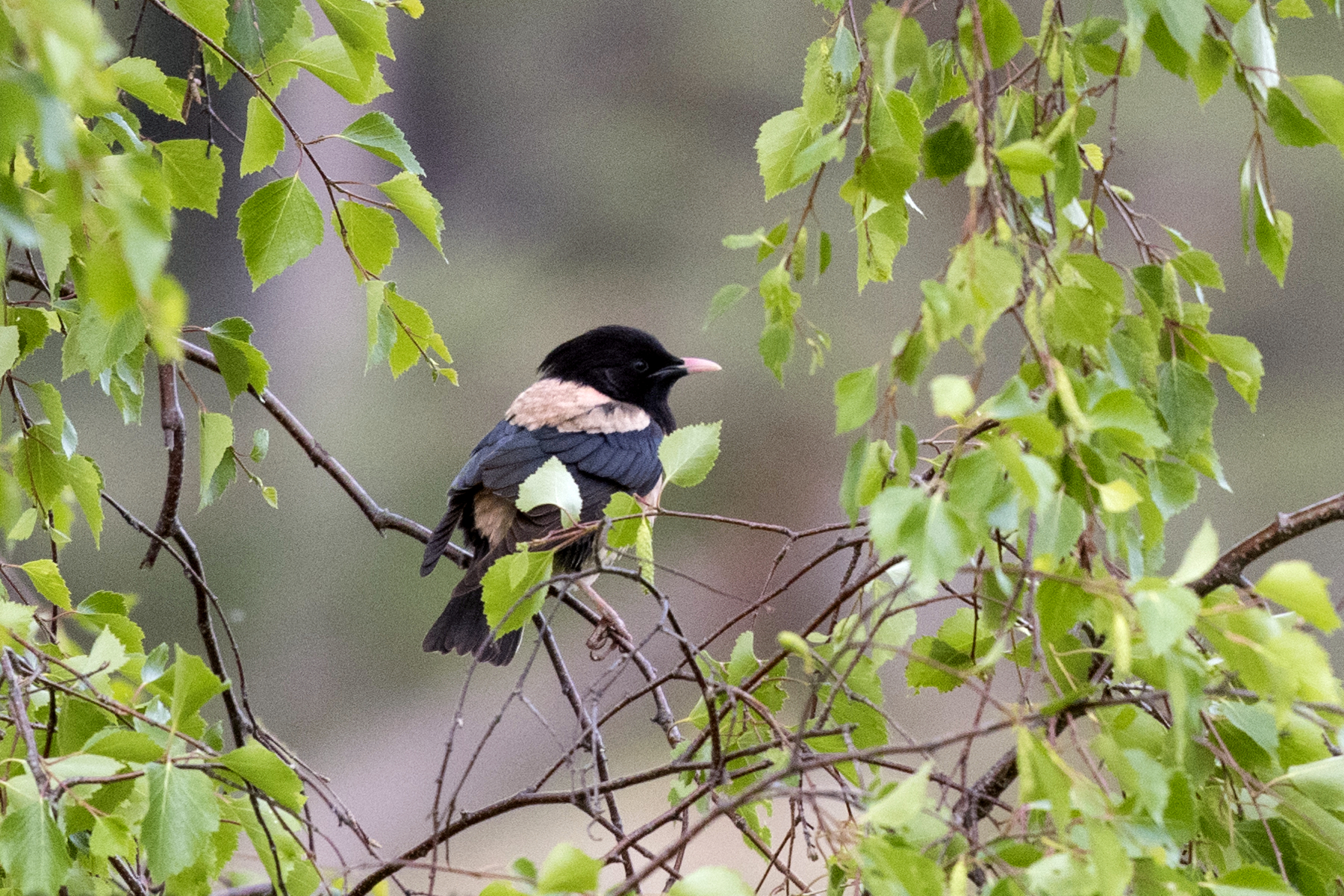
Rosy starling, Galtström, Västernorrland

== Dippers ==
Order: Passeriformes Family: Cinclidae

Dippers are a group of perching birds whose habitat includes aquatic environments in the Americas, Europe, and Asia. They are named for their bobbing or dipping movements.

- White-throated dipper (strömstare) Cinclus cinclus (B)
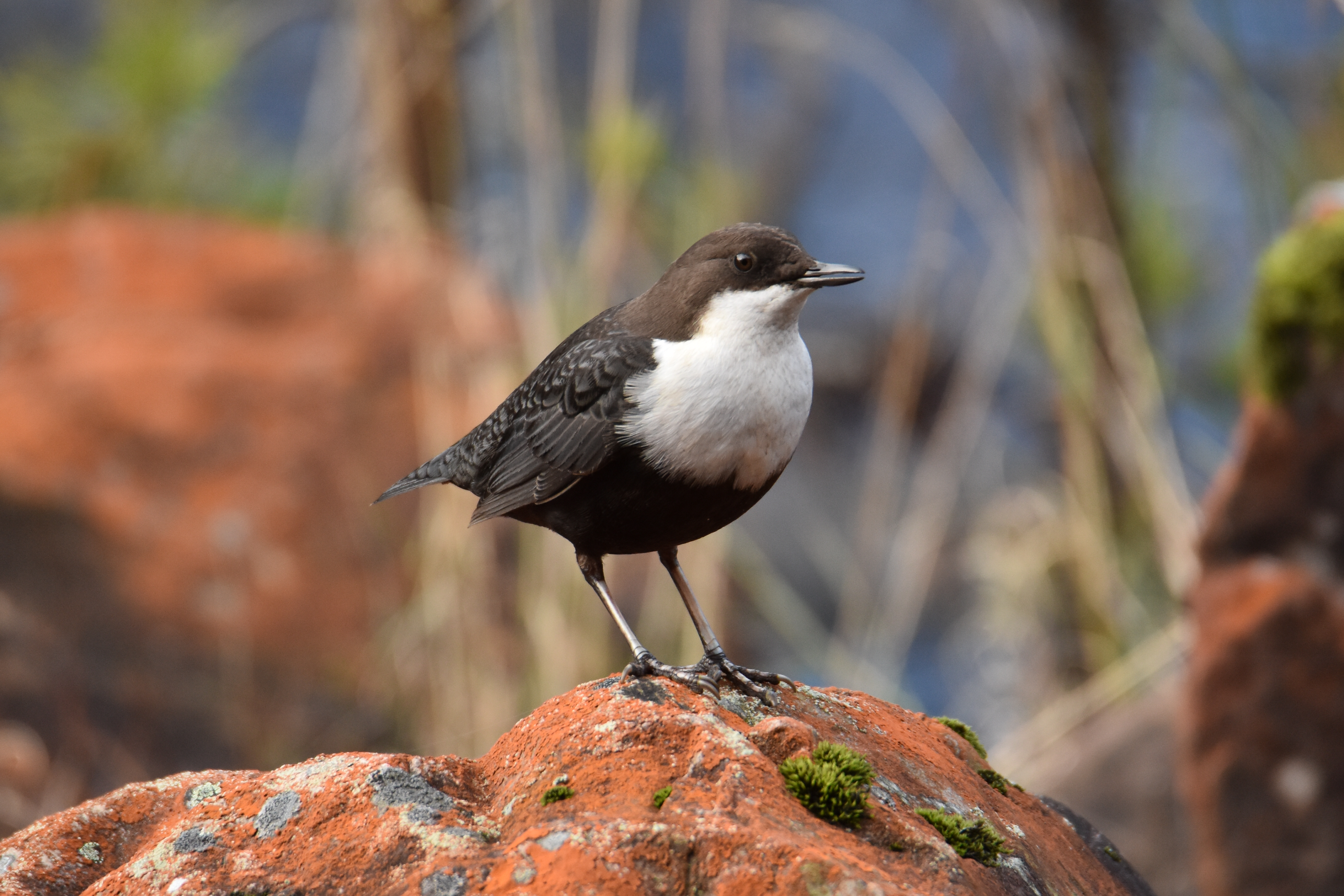
White-throated dipper, Rottnan, Värmland

== Thrushes and allies ==
Order: Passeriformes Family: Turdidae

The thrushes are a family of birds with a cosmopolitan distribution that originated in the Old World. They are plump, soft-plumaged, small-to-medium-sized insectivores or omnivores, often feeding on the ground. Many have attractive songs.

- White's thrush (guldtrast) Zoothera aurea (R)
- Swainson's thrush (beigekindad skogstrast) Catharus ustulatus (R)
- Veery (rostskogstrast) Catharus fuscescens (R)
- Hermit thrush (eremitskogstrast) Catharus guttatus (R)
- Siberian thrush (sibirisk trast) Geokichla sibirica (R)
- Mistle thrush (dubbeltrast) Turdus viscivorus (B)
- Song thrush (taltrast) Turdus philomelos (B)
- Redwing (rödvingetrast) Turdus iliacus (B)
- Common blackbird (koltrast) Turdus merula (B)
- Fieldfare (björktrast) Turdus pilaris (B)
- Ring ouzel (ringtrast) Turdus torquatus (B)
- Black-throated thrush (svarthalsad trast) Turdus atrogularis (R)
- Naumann's thrush (rödtrast) Turdus naumanni (R)
- Dusky thrush (bruntrast) Turdus eunomus (R)
- Eyebrowed thrush (gråhalsad trast) Turdus obscurus (R)
- American robin (vandringstrast) Turdus migratorius (R)
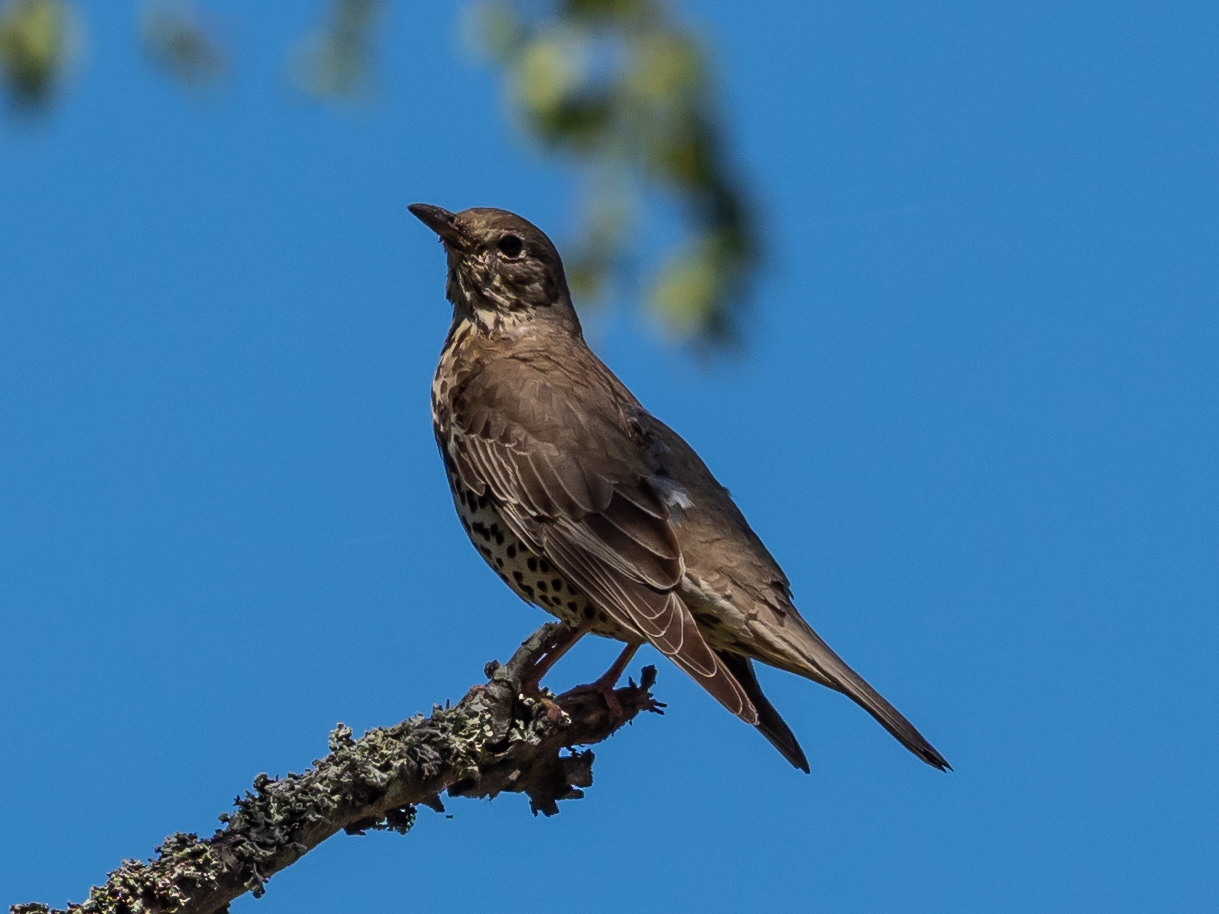
Mistle thrush, Vaxholm, Stockholm

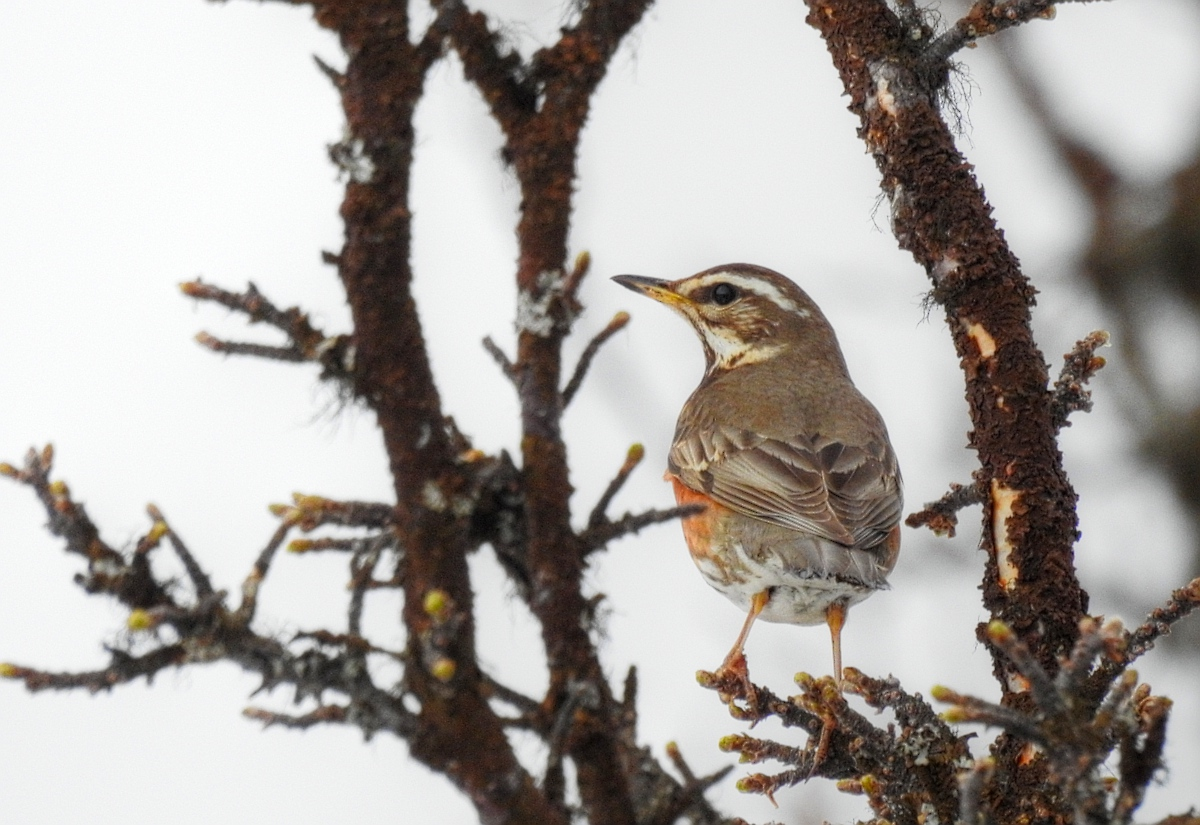
Redwing, Sorsele, Västerbotten

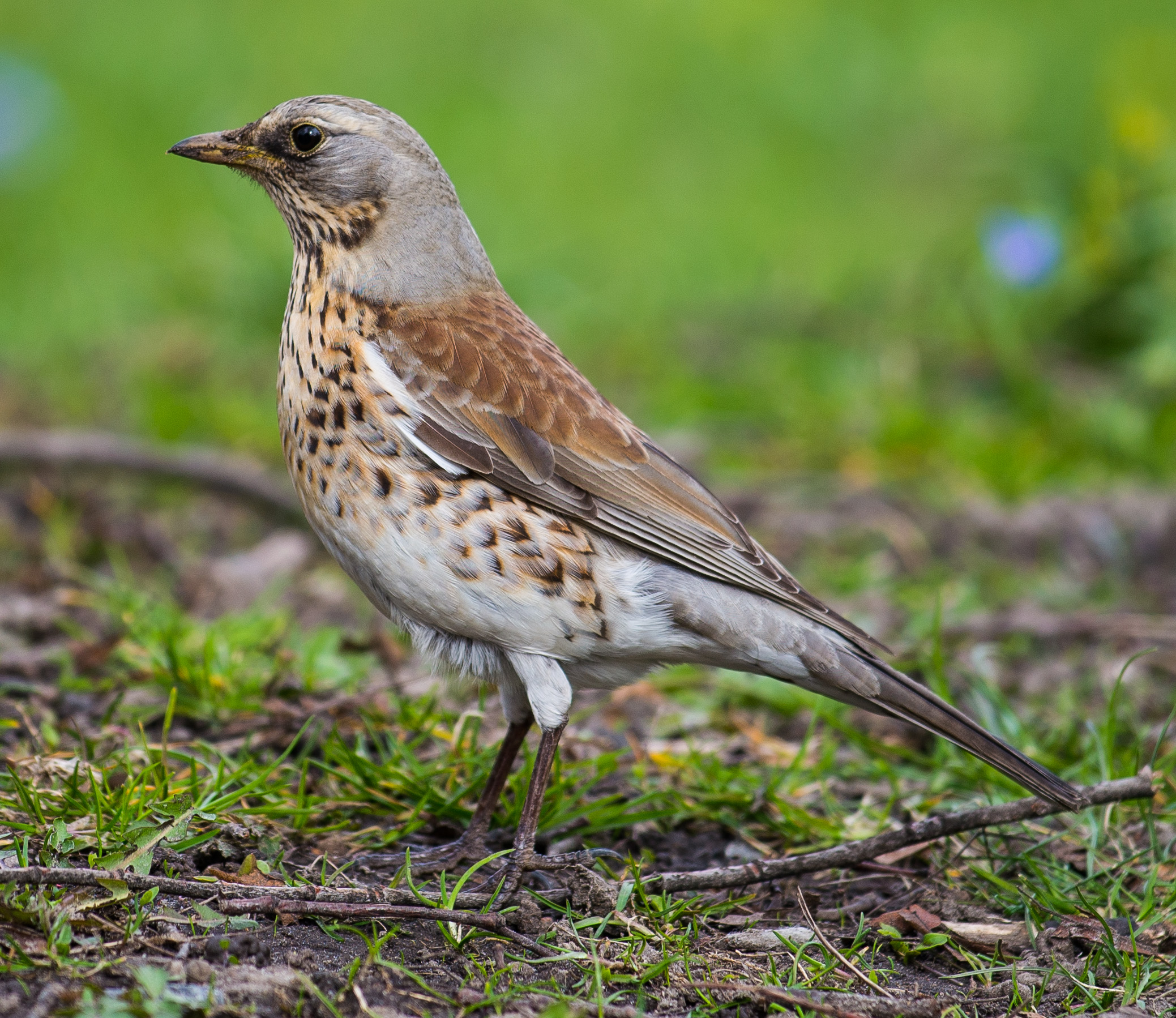
Fieldfare, Stockholm

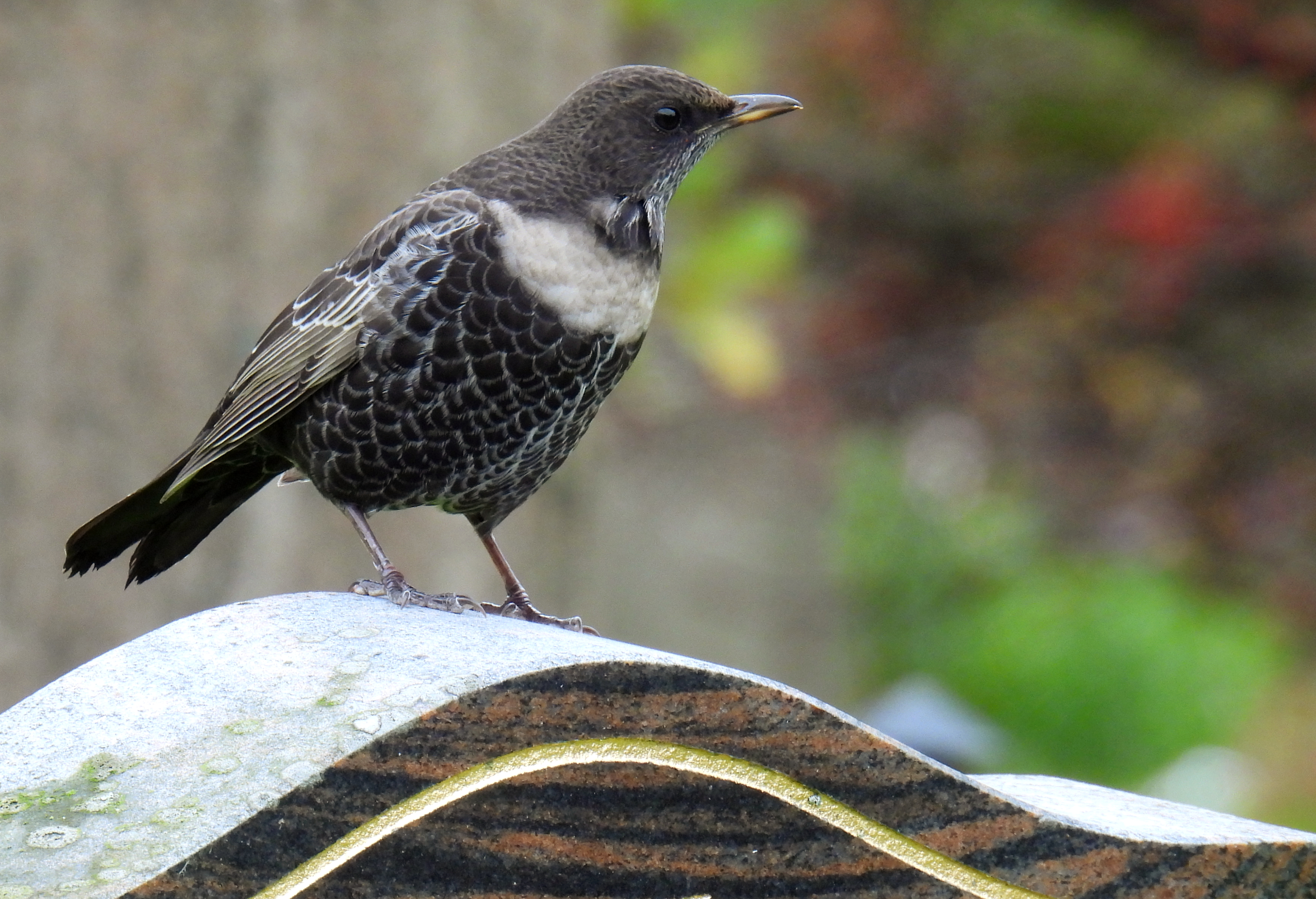
Ring ouzel, Gothenburg

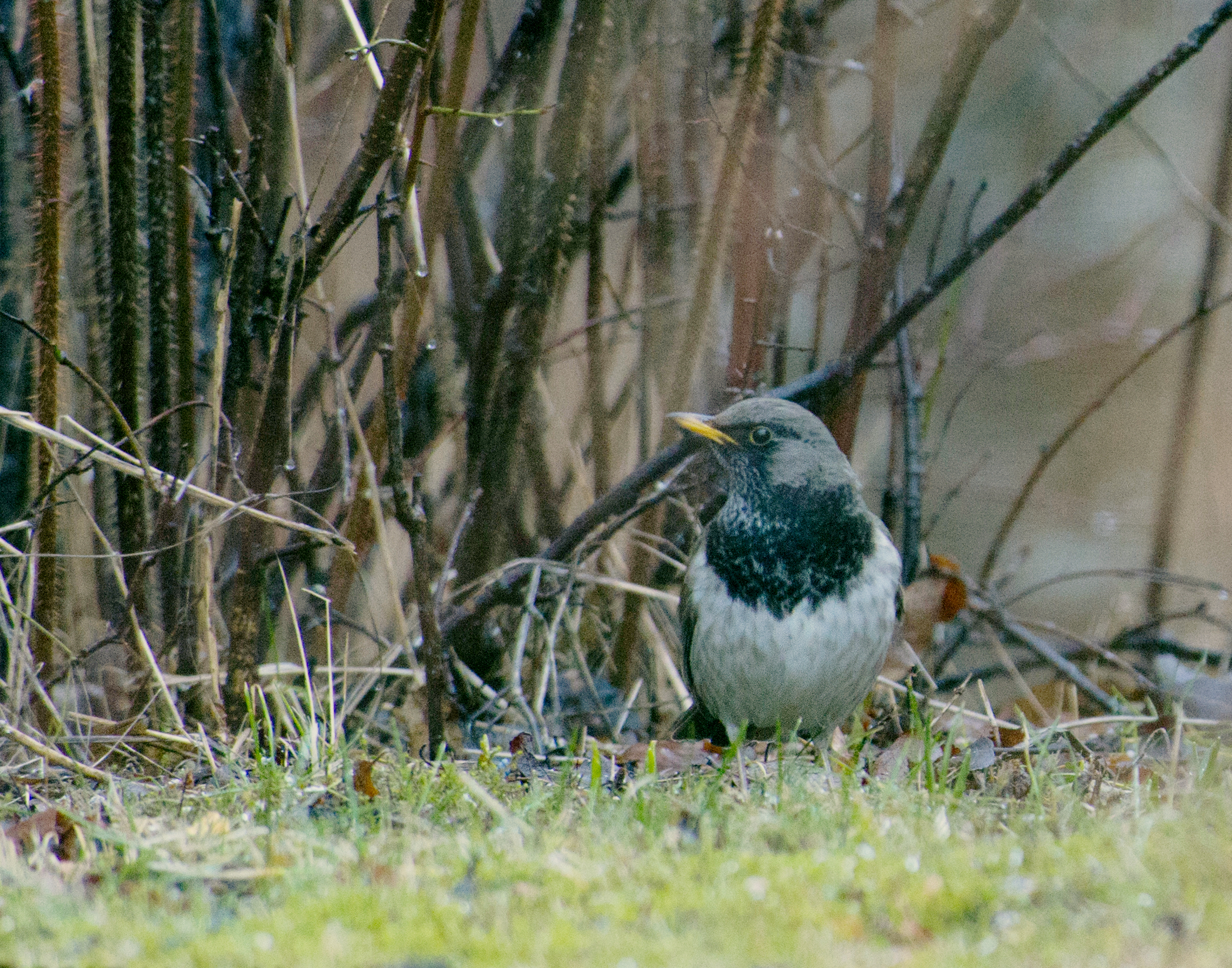
Black-throated thrush, Växjö, Kronoberg

== Old World flycatchers and chats ==
Order: Passeriformes Family: Muscicapidae

The Old World flycatchers and chats are a large group of birds which are mainly small insectivores, though some also eat berries and small seeds. The appearance of these birds is highly varied; many have weak songs but others (notably the nightingales) have among the most complex and varied songs of all birds.

- Asian brown flycatcher (glasögonflugsnappare) Muscicapa dauurica (R)
- Spotted flycatcher (grå flugsnappare) Muscicapa striata (B)
- European robin (rödhake) Erithacus rubecula (B)
- White-throated robin (vitstrupig näktergal) Irania gutturalis (R)
- Thrush nightingale (näktergal) Luscinia luscinia (B)
- Common nightingale (sydnäktergal) Luscinia megarhynchos (R)
- Bluethroat (blåhake) Luscinia svecica (B)
- Siberian rubythroat (rubinnäktergal) Calliope calliope (R)
- Red-breasted flycatcher (mindre flugsnappare) Ficedula parva (B)
- Taiga flycatcher (tajgaflugsnappare) Ficedula albicilla (R)
- Collared flycatcher (halsbandsflugsnappare) Ficedula albicollis (B)
- European pied flycatcher (svartvit flugsnappare) Ficedula hypoleuca (B)
- Red-flanked bluetail (tajgablåstjärt) Tarsiger cyanurus (b)
- Black redstart (svart rödstjärt) Phoenicurus ochruros (B)
- Common redstart (rödstjärt) Phoenicurus phoenicurus (B)
- Common rock thrush (stentrast) Monticola saxatilis (R)
- Blue rock thrush (blåtrast) Monticola solitarius (R)
- Whinchat (buskskvätta) Saxicola rubetra (B)
- Pied bush chat (svart buskskvätta) Saxicola caprata (R)
- Siberian stonechat (vitgumpad buskskvätta) Saxicola maurus (R)
  - includes Amur stonechat (amurbuskskvätta) Saxicola maurus stejnegeri (R)
- European stonechat (svarthakad buskskvätta) Saxicola rubicola (B)
- Desert wheatear (ökenstenskvätta) Oenanthe deserti (R)
- Western black-eared wheatear (västlig medelhavsstenskvätta) Oenanthe hispanica (R)
- Pied wheatear (nunnestenskvätta) Oenanthe pleschanka (R)
- Eastern black-eared wheatear (östlig medelhavsstenskvätta) Oenanthe melanoleuca (R)
- Northern wheatear (stenskvätta) Oenanthe oenanthe (B)
- Isabelline wheatear (isabellastenskvätta) Oenanthe isabellina (R)
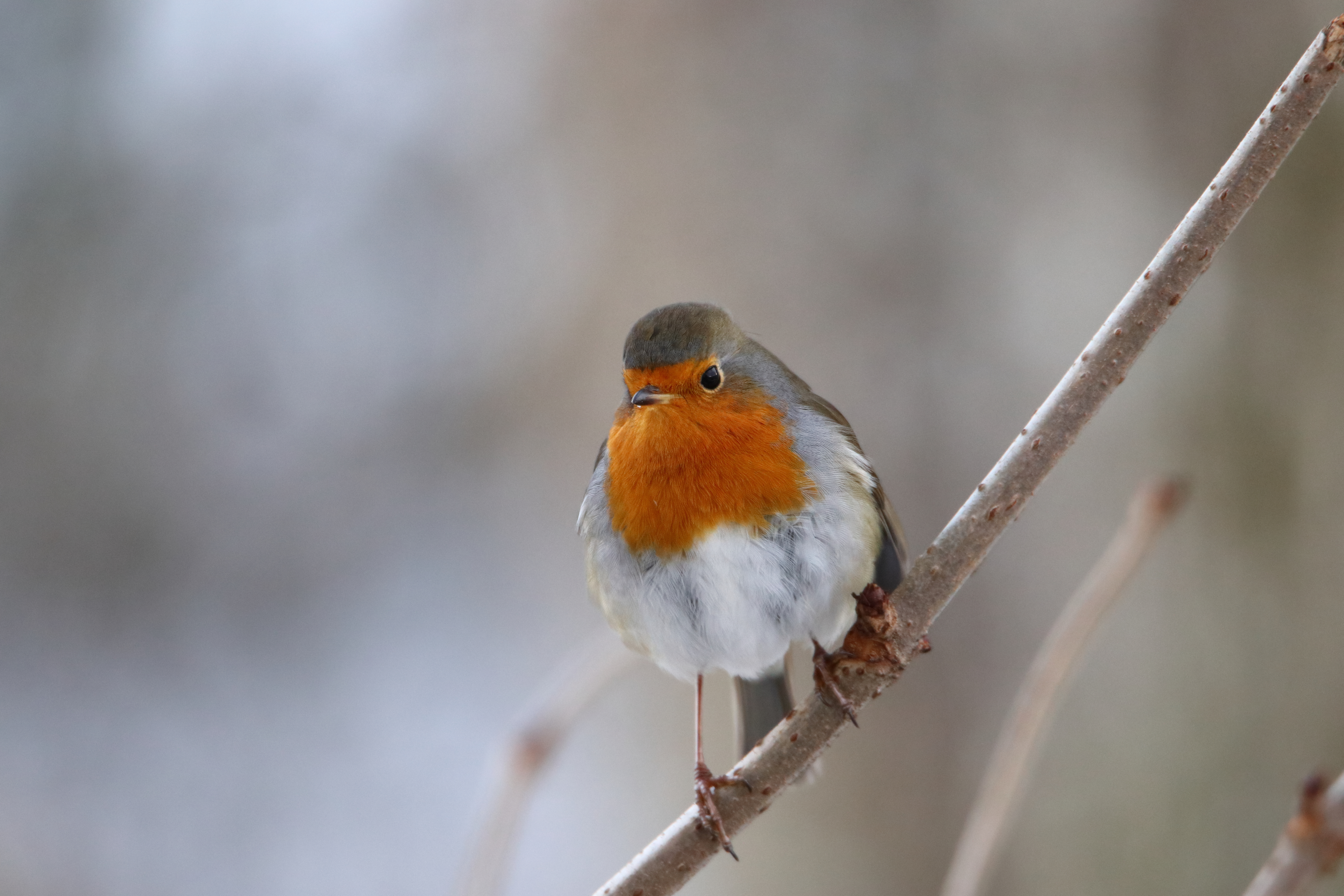
European robin, Häckeberga Castle, Scania

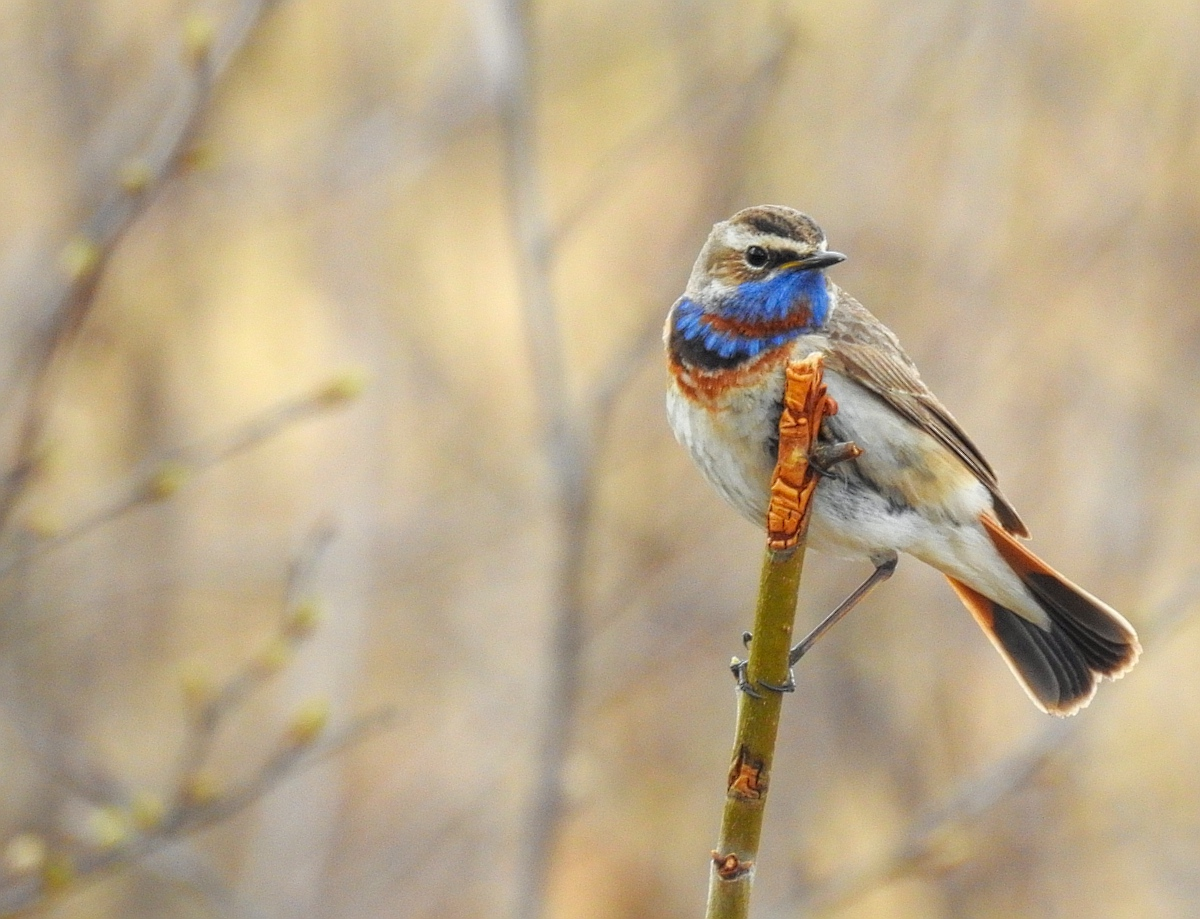
Bluethroat, Ammarnäs, Västerbotten

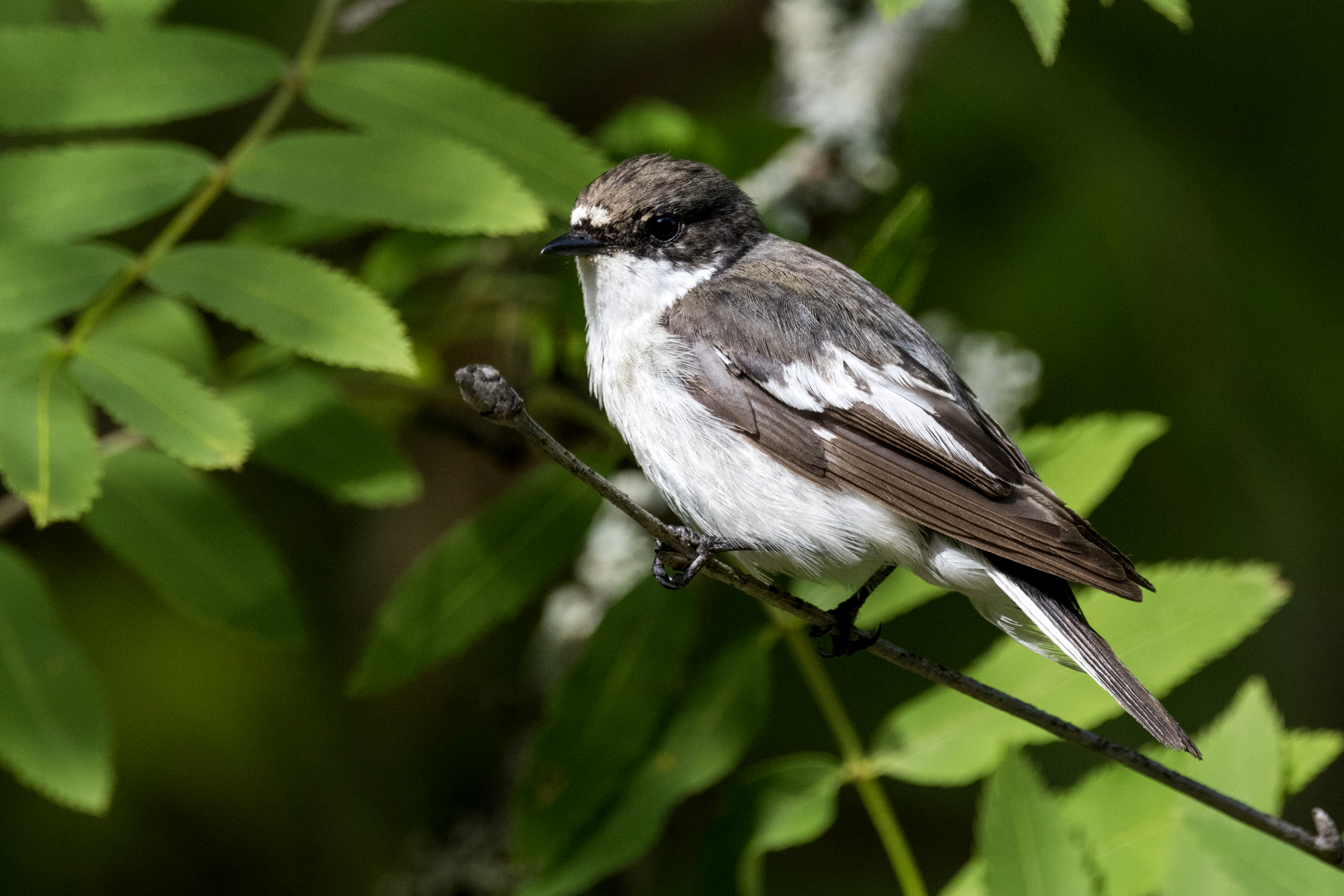
European pied flycatcher, Grindtorp, Västmanland

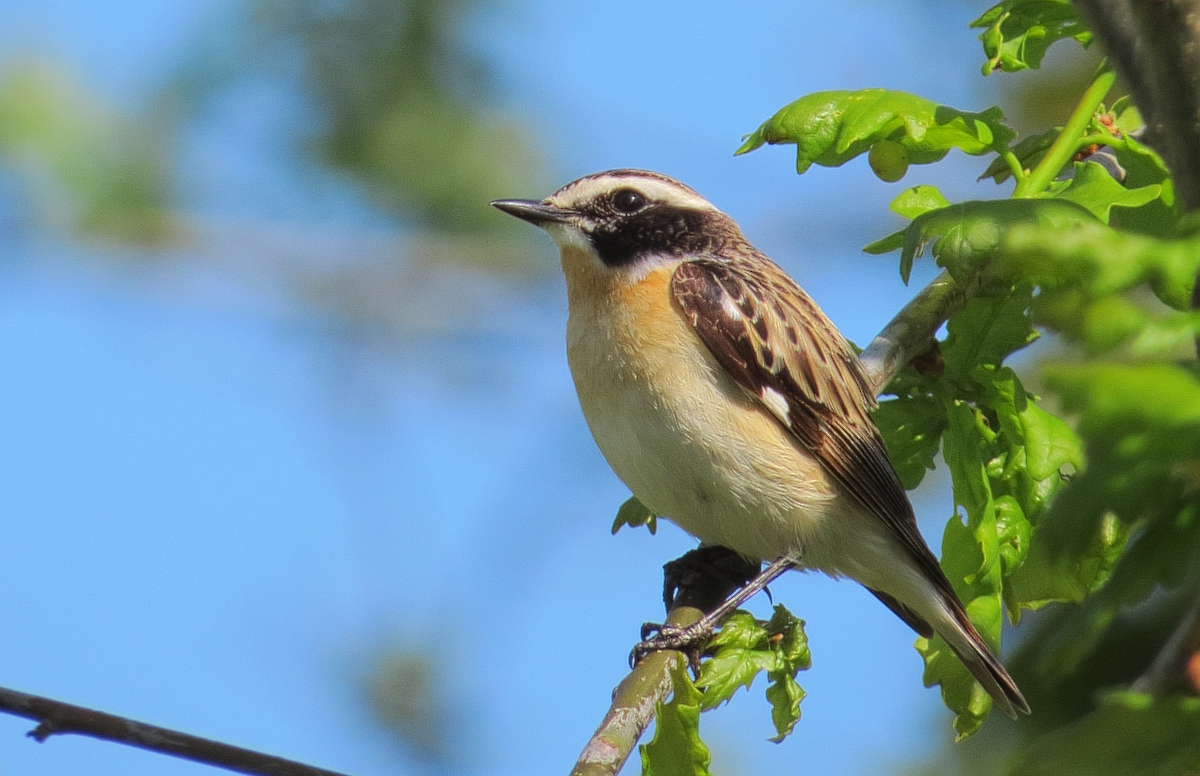
Whinchat, Falkenberg, Halland

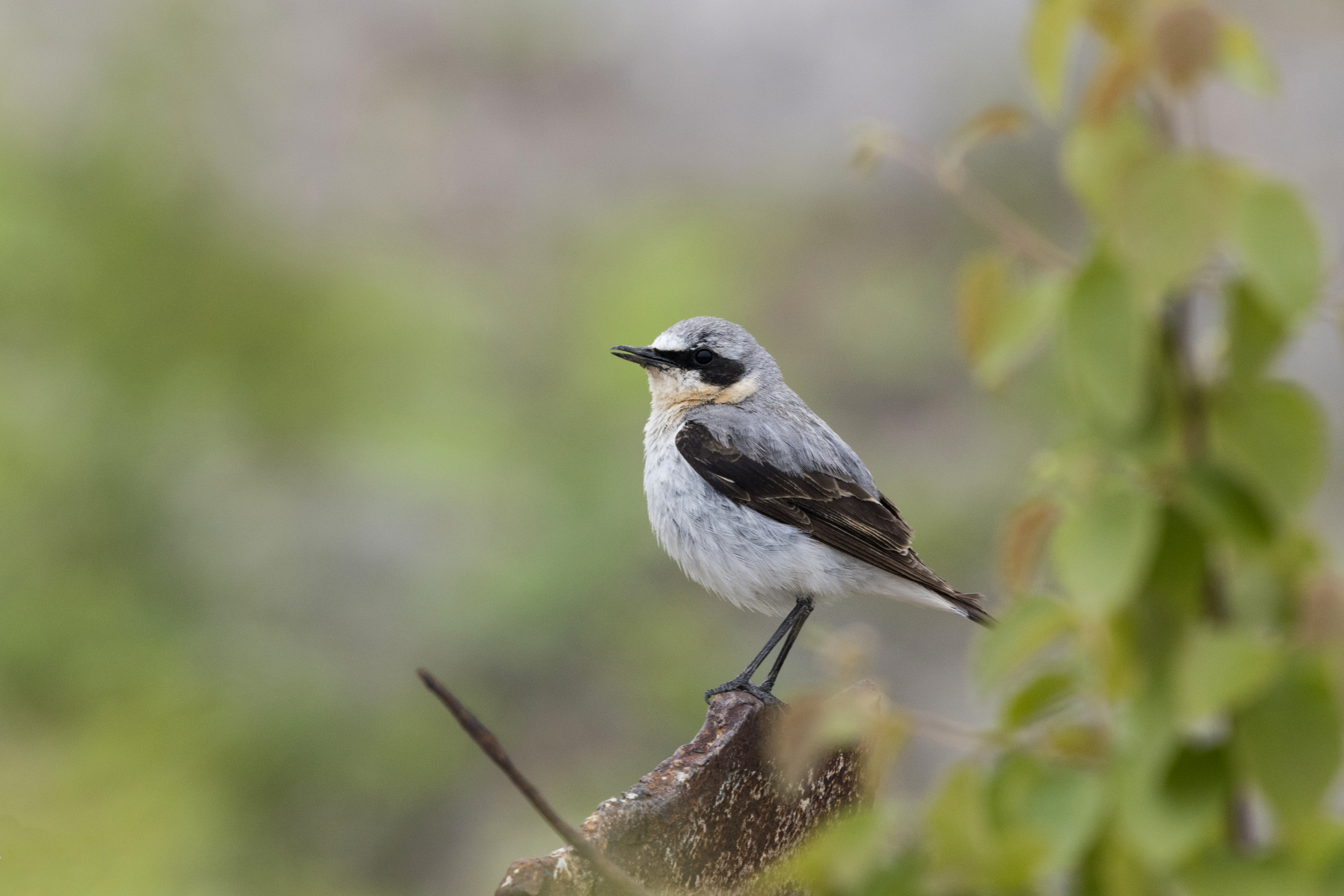
Northern wheatear, Hanvedsmossen, Södermanland

== Accentors and dunnocks ==
Order: Passeriformes Family: Prunellidae

The accentors are the only bird family which is endemic to the Palearctic. They are small, fairly drab species superficially similar to sparrows.

- Alpine accentor (alpjärnsparv) Prunella collaris (R)
- Black-throated accentor (svartstrupig järnsparv) Prunella atrogularis (R)
- Dunnock (järnsparv) Prunella modularis (B)
- Siberian accentor (sibirisk järnsparv) Prunella montanella (R)
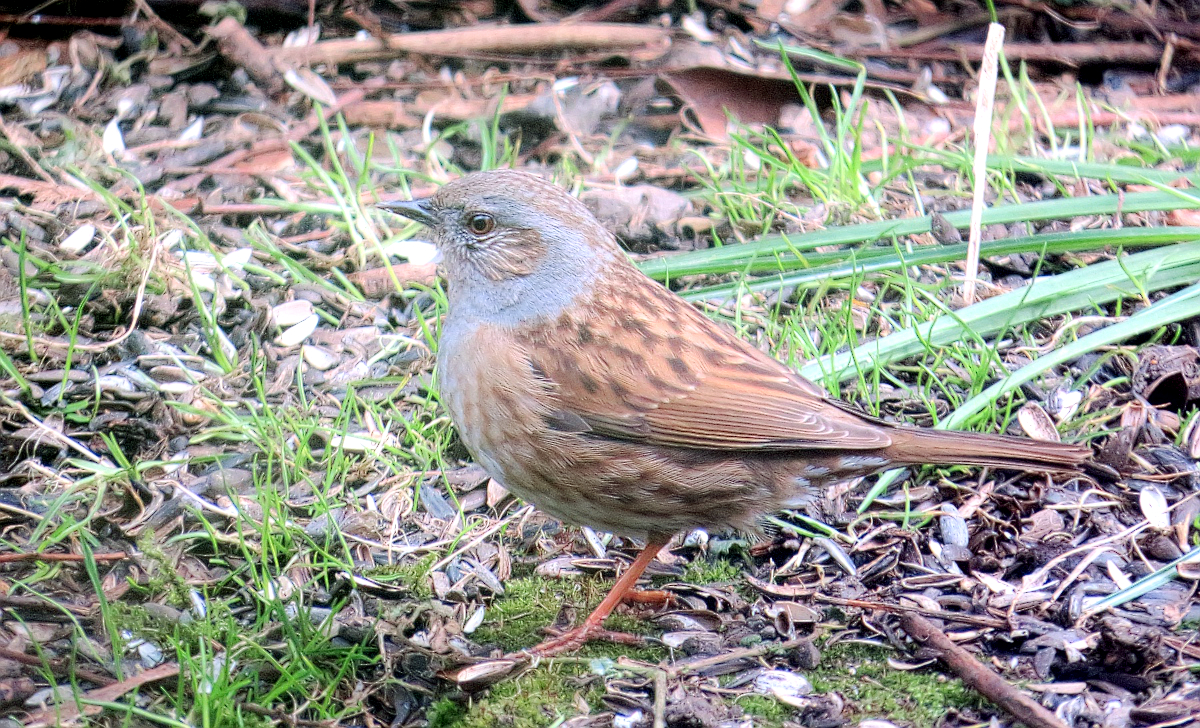
Dunnock, Lindome, Västra Götaland

== Old World sparrows ==
Order: Passeriformes Family: Passeridae

In general, Old World sparrows tend to be small, plump, brown or grey birds with short tails and short powerful beaks. Sparrows are seed eaters, but they also consume small insects.

- Eurasian tree sparrow (pilfink) Passer montanus (B)
- Spanish sparrow (spansk sparv) Passer hispaniolensis (R)
- House sparrow (gråsparv) Passer domesticus (B)
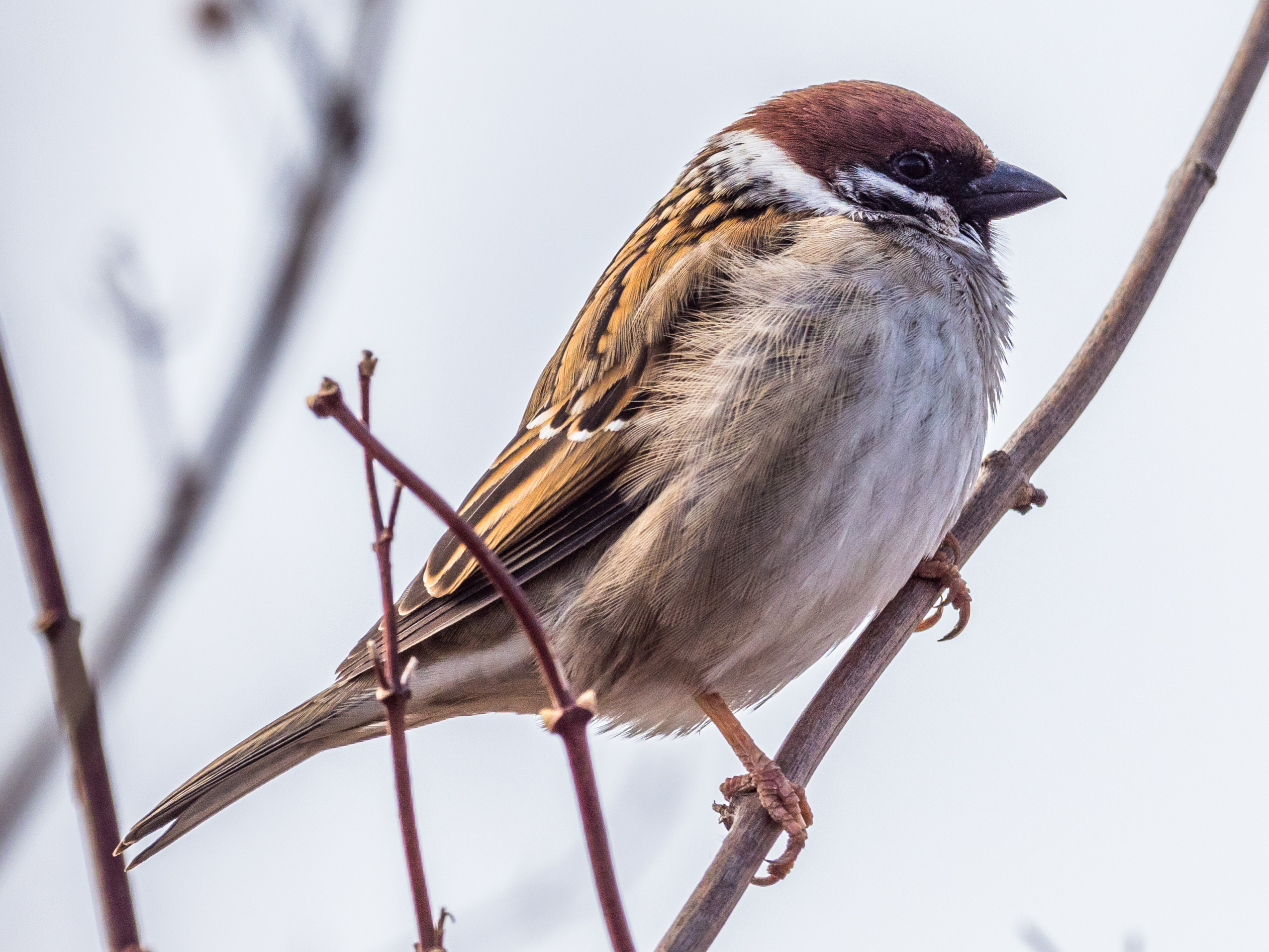
Eurasian tree sparrow, Vaxholm, Stockholm

== Wagtails and pipits ==
Order: Passeriformes Family: Motacillidae

Motacillidae is a family of small birds with medium to long tails which includes the wagtails and pipits. They are slender ground-feeding insectivores of open country.

- Grey wagtail (forsärla) Motacilla cinerea (B)
- Western yellow wagtail (gulärla) Motacilla flava (B)
- Citrine wagtail (citronärla) Motacilla citreola (O)
- Eastern yellow wagtail (beringärla) Motacilla tschutschensis (R)
- White wagtail (sädesärla) Motacilla alba (B)
- Blyth's pipit (mongolpiplärka) Anthus godlewskii (R)
- Tawny pipit (fältpiplärka) Anthus campestris (B)
- Richard's pipit (större piplärka) Anthus richardi (O)
- Pechora pipit (tundrapiplärka) Anthus gustavi (R)
- Tree pipit (trädpiplärka) Anthus trivialis (B)
- Olive-backed pipit (sibirisk piplärka) Anthus hodgsoni (O)
- Red-throated pipit (rödstrupig piplärka) Anthus cervinus (B)
- Siberian pipit (stenpiplärka) Anthus japonicus (R)
- American pipit (amerikansk piplärka) Anthus rubescens (R)
- Meadow pipit (ängspiplärka) Anthus pratensis (B)
- European rock pipit (skärpiplärka) Anthus petrosus (B)
- Water pipit (vattenpiplärka) Anthus spinoletta (O)
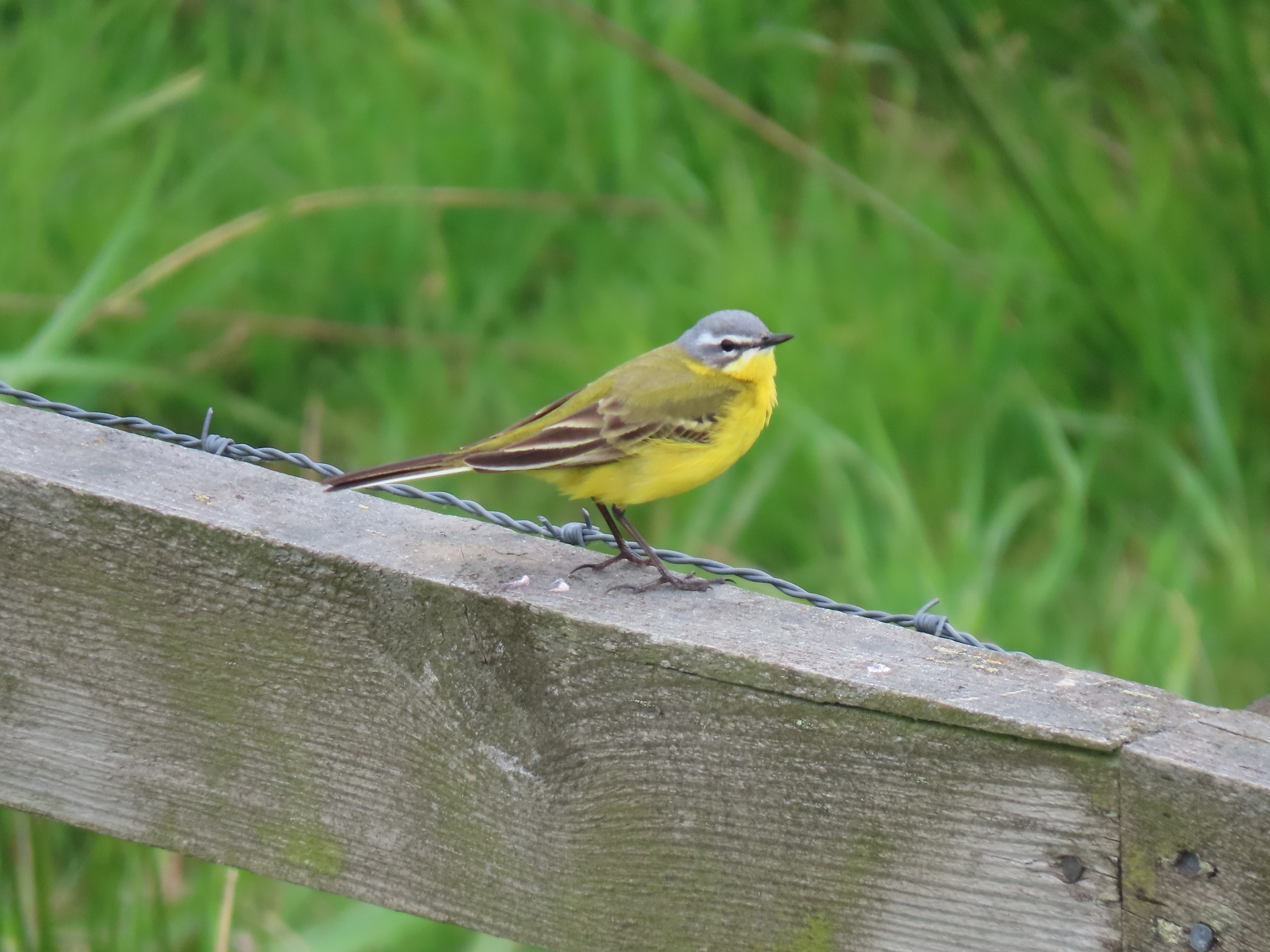
Western yellow wagtail, Vombs Ängar, Scania

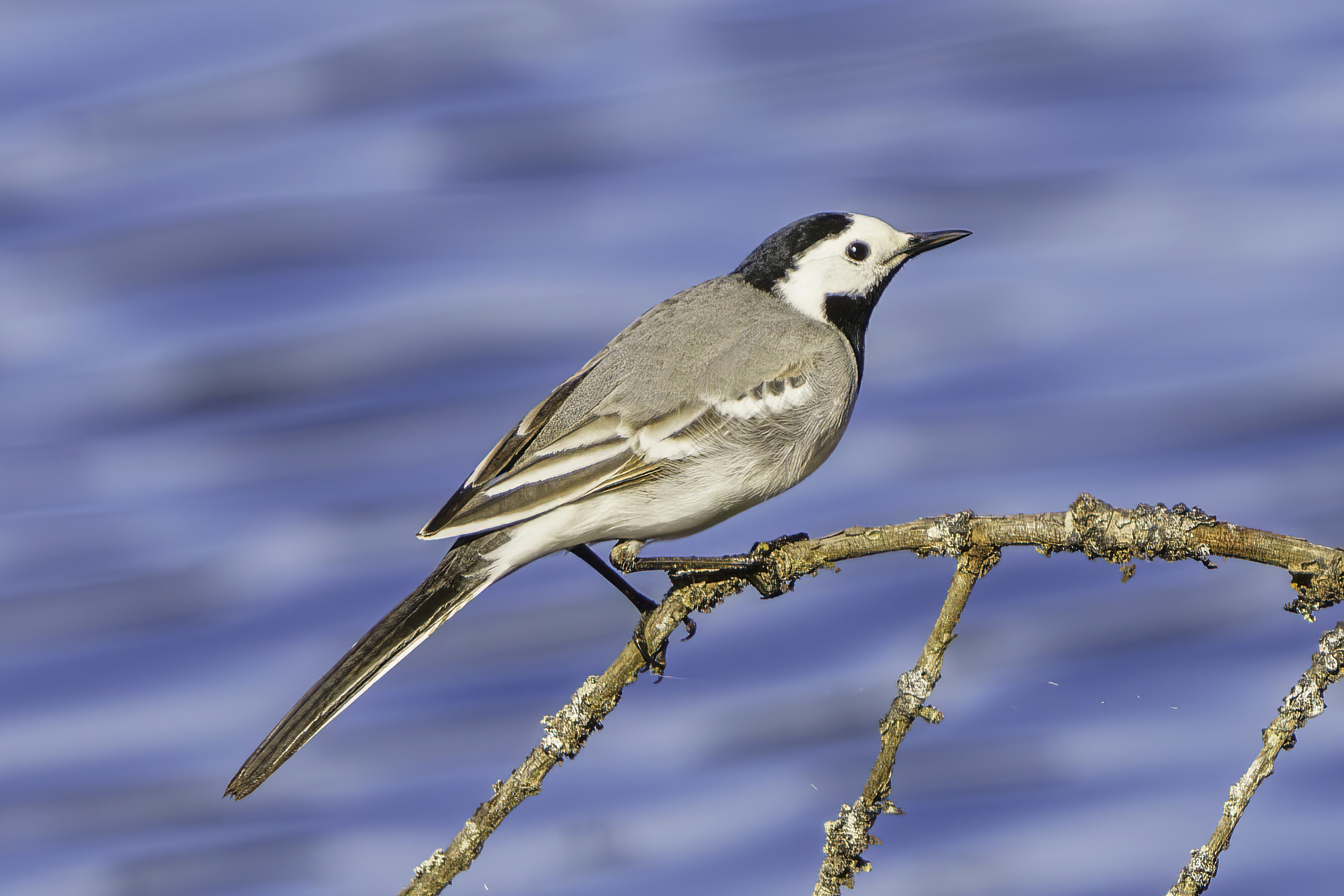
White wagtail, Vaxholm, Stockholm

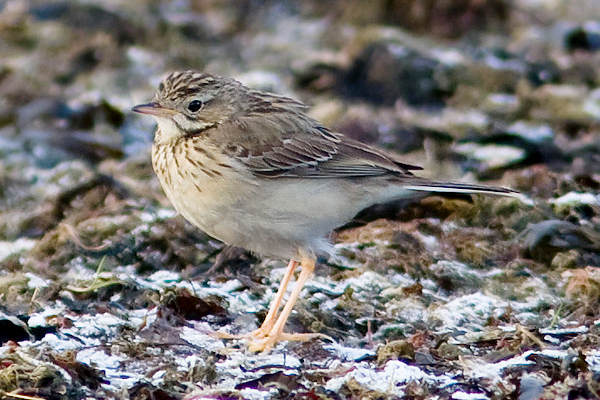
Blyth's pipit, Träslöv, Halland

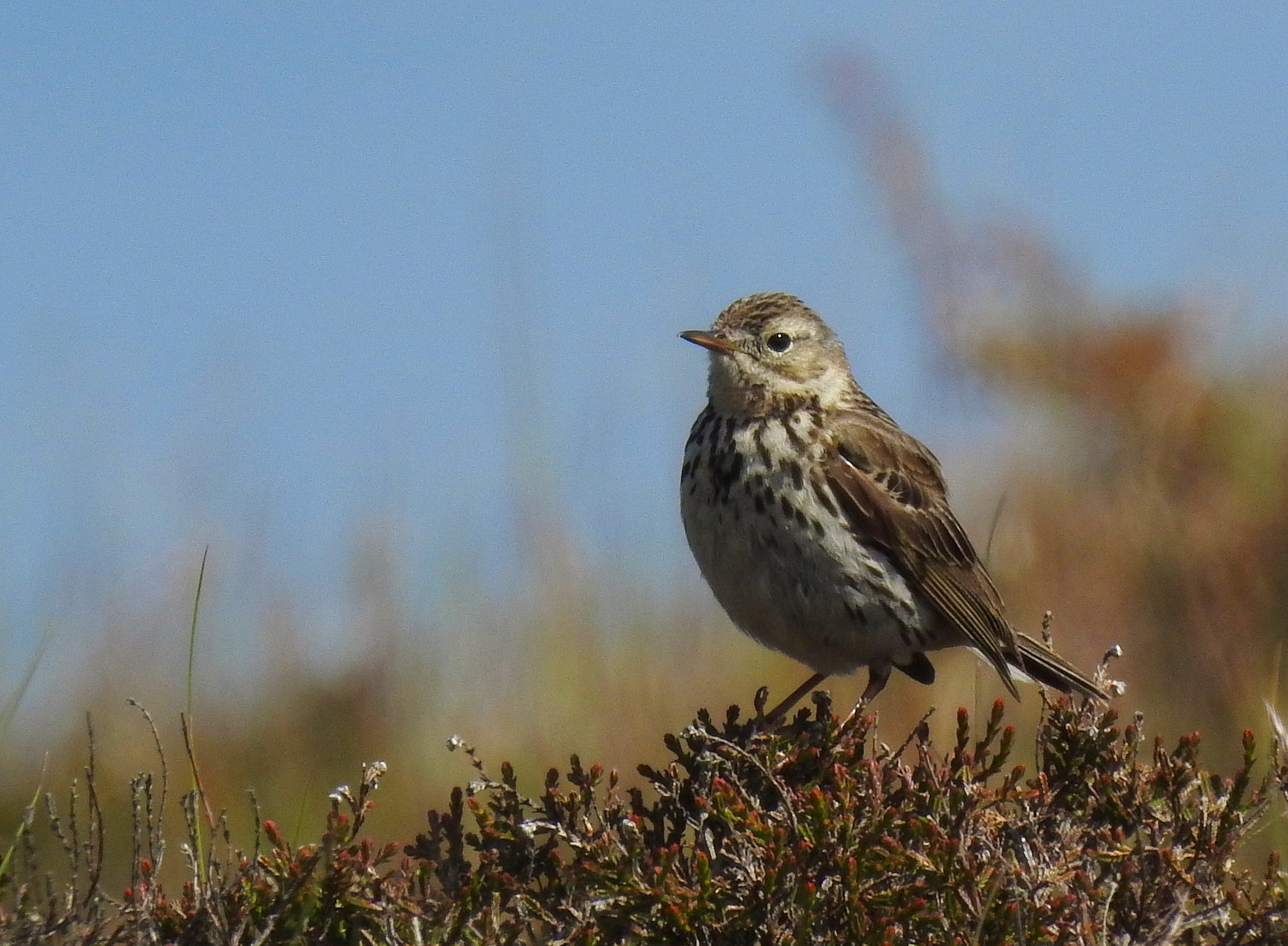
Meadow pipit, Varberg, Halland

== Finches, euphonias, and allies ==
Order: Passeriformes Family: Fringillidae

Finches are seed-eating birds that are small to moderately large and have a short strong beak, usually conical and in some species very large. All have twelve tail feathers and nine primaries. These birds have a bouncing flight with alternating bouts of flapping and gliding on closed wings, and most sing well.

- Brambling (bergfink) Fringilla montifringilla (B)
- Eurasian chaffinch (bofink) Fringilla coelebs (B)
- Hawfinch (stenknäck) Coccothraustes coccothraustes (B)
- Common rosefinch (rosenfink) Carpodacus erythrinus (B)
- Pine grosbeak (tallbit) Pinicola enucleator (B)
- Eurasian bullfinch (domherre) Pyrrhula pyrrhula (B)
- Mongolian finch (mongolfink) Bucanetes mongolicus (R)
- Trumpeter finch (ökentrumpetare) Bucanetes githagineus (R)
- European greenfinch (grönfink) Chloris chloris (B)
- Twite (vinterhämpling) Linaria flavirostris (B)
- Common linnet (hämpling) Linaria cannabina (B)
- Redpoll (gråsiska) Acanthis flammea (B)
- Two-barred crossbill (bändelkorsnäbb) Loxia leucoptera (B)
- Parrot crossbill (större korsnäbb) Loxia pytyopsittacus (B)
- Red crossbill (mindre korsnäbb) Loxia curvirostra (B)
- European goldfinch (steglits) Carduelis carduelis (B)
- European serin (gulhämpling) Serinus serinus (B)
- Eurasian siskin (grönsiska) Spinus spinus (B)
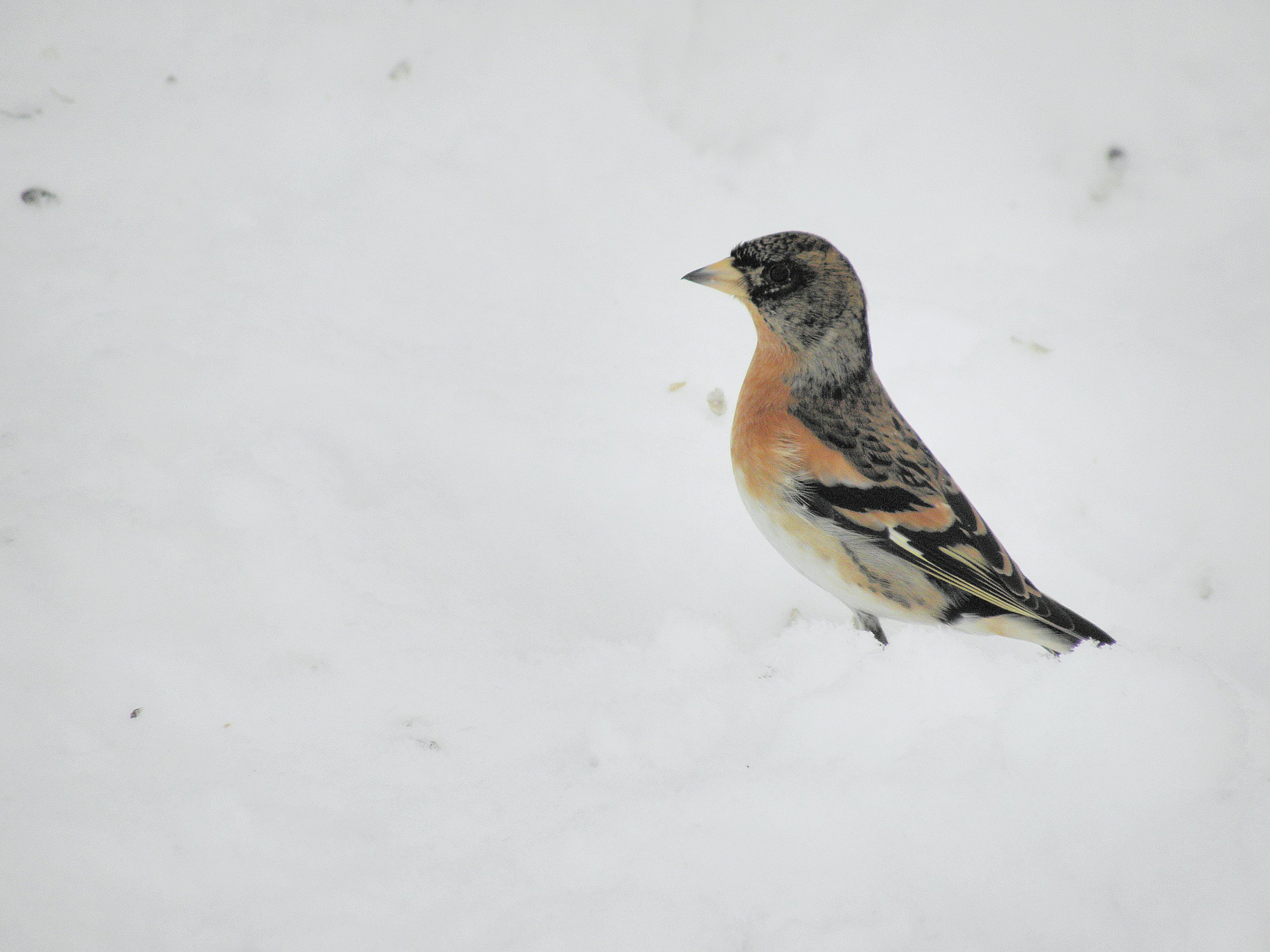
Brambling, Sörby, Örebro

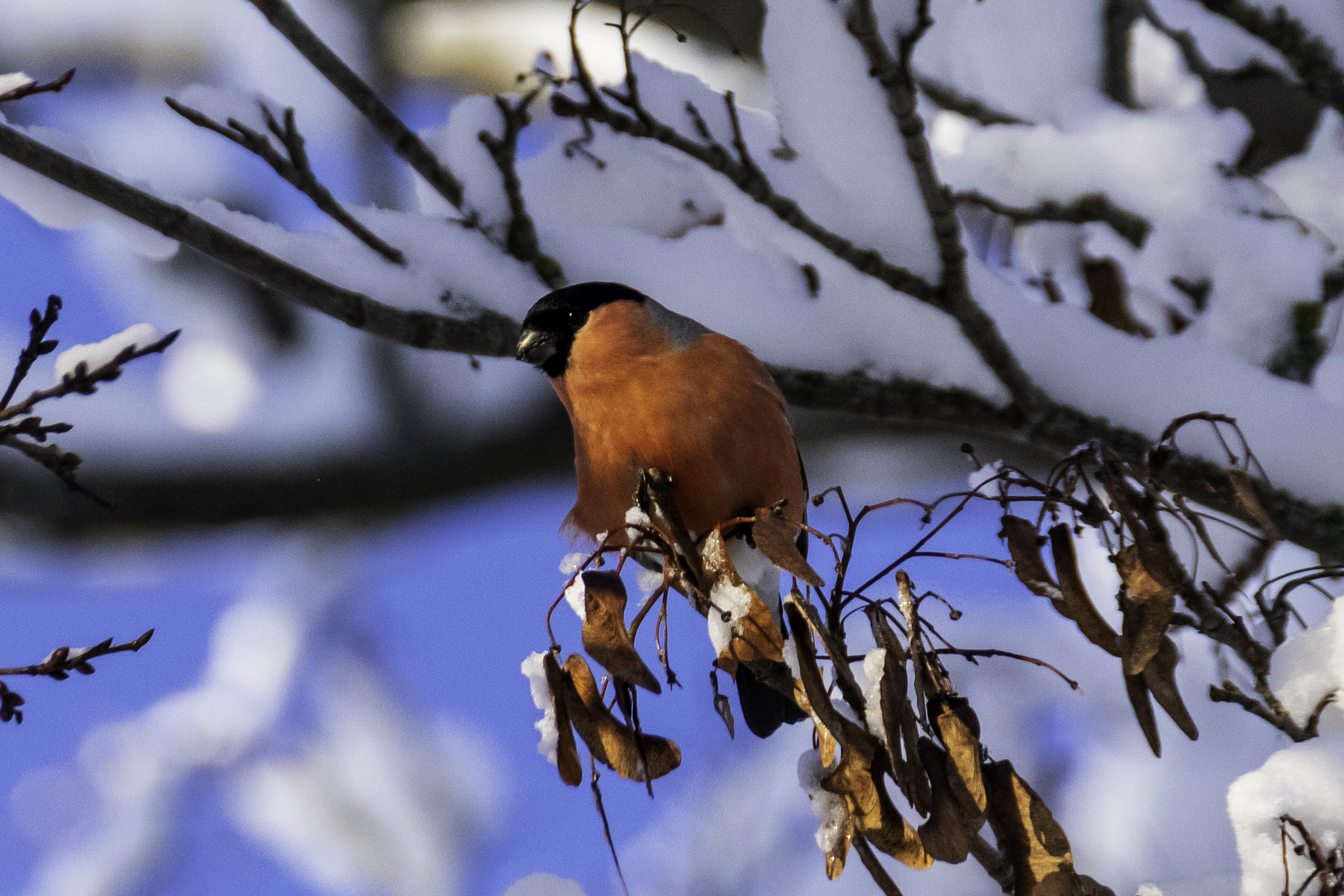
Eurasian bullfinch, Roma, Gotland

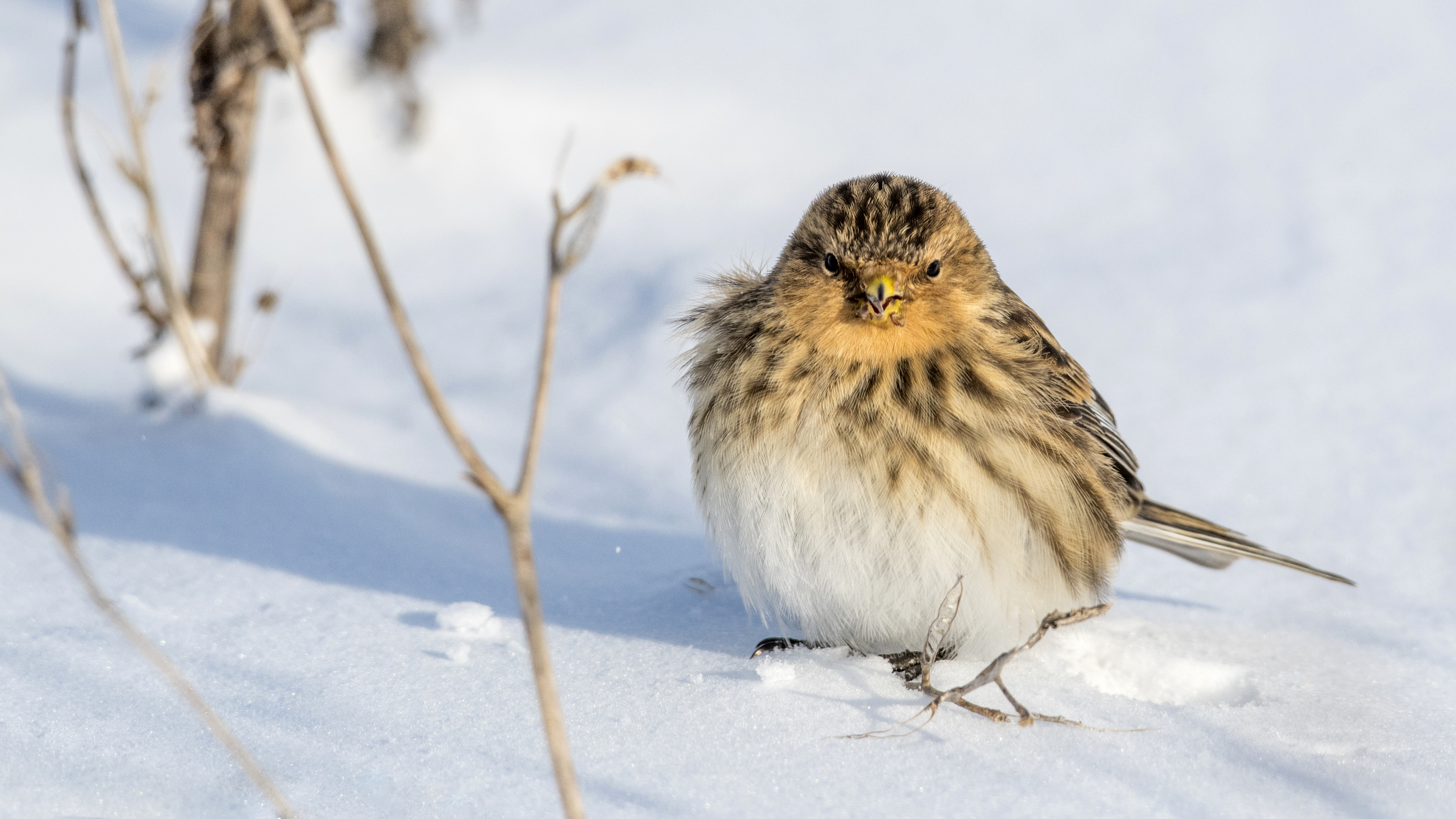
Twite, Uppsala, Uppland

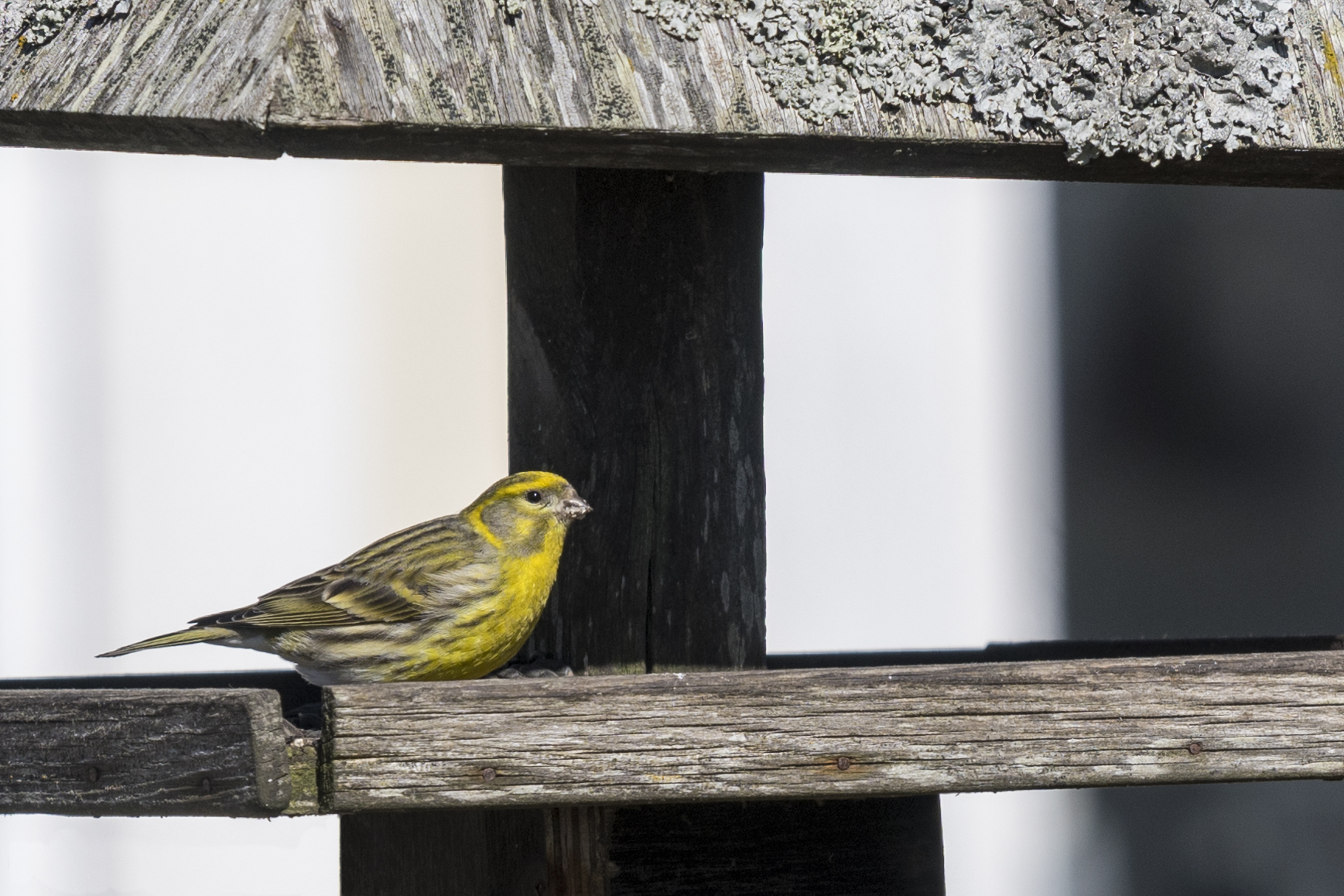
Serin, Landsort, Södermanland

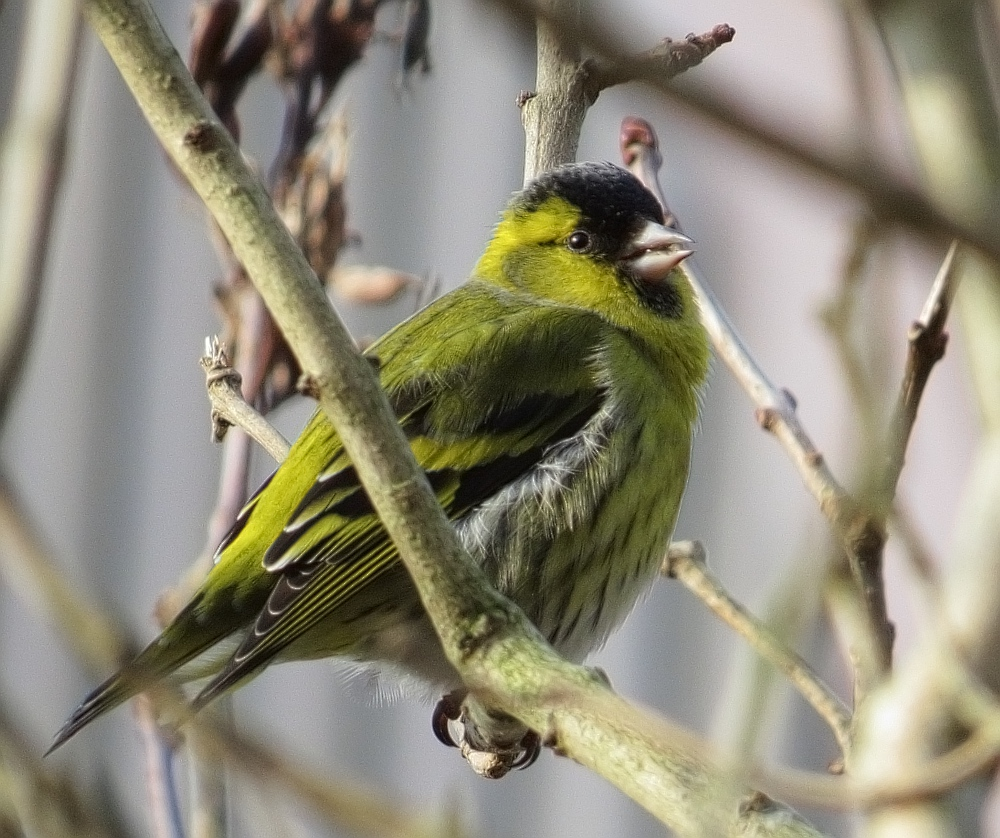
Eurasian siskin, Lindome, Västra Götaland

== Longspurs and snow buntings ==
Order: Passeriformes Family: Calcariidae

The Calcariidae are a small family of birds that had been traditionally grouped with the buntings, but differ in a number of respects and are usually found in more open grassy areas.

- Snow bunting (snösparv) Plectrophenax nivalis (B)
- Lapland longspur (lappsparv) Calcarius lapponicus (B)
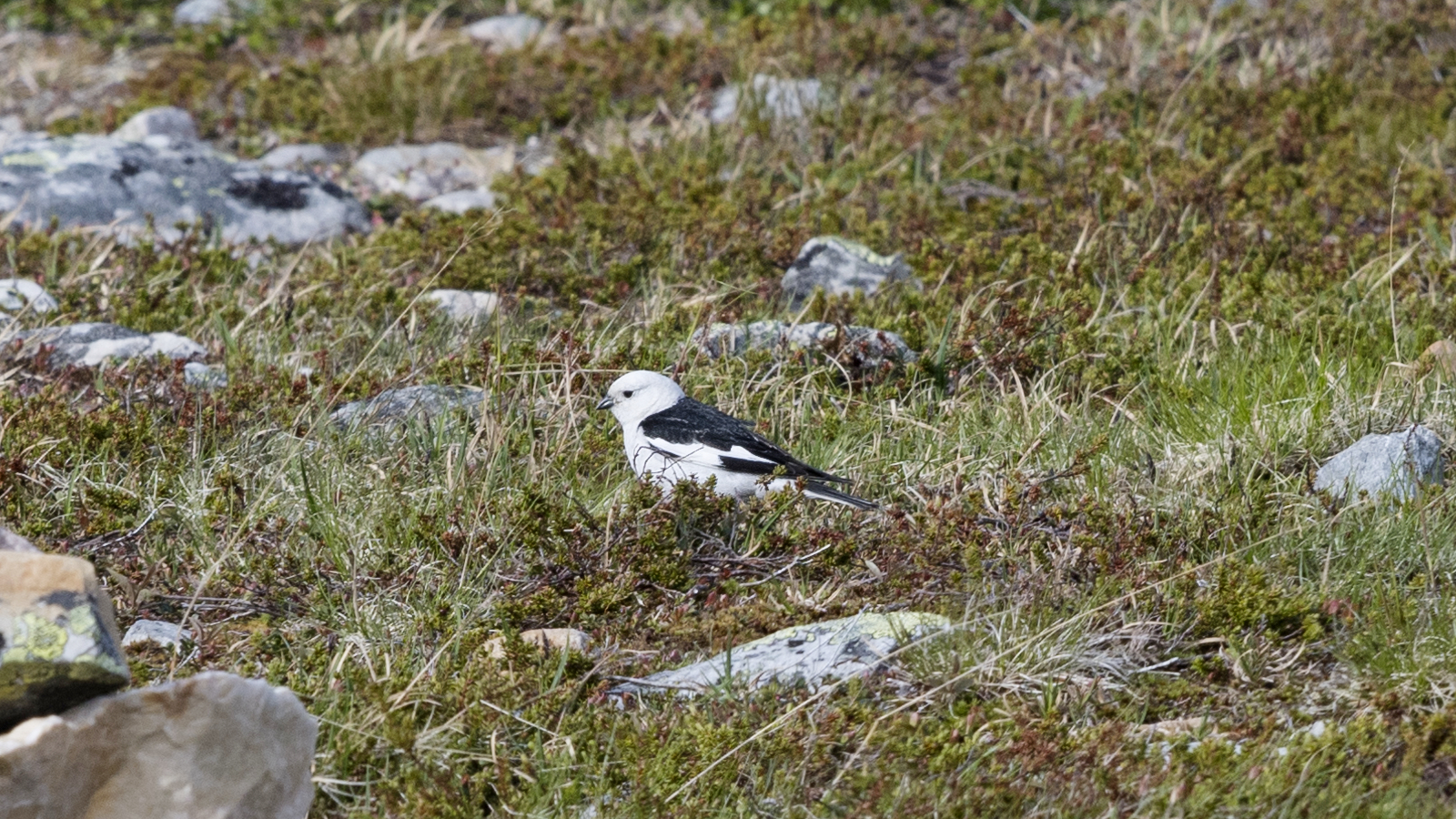
Snow bunting, Idre, Dalarna

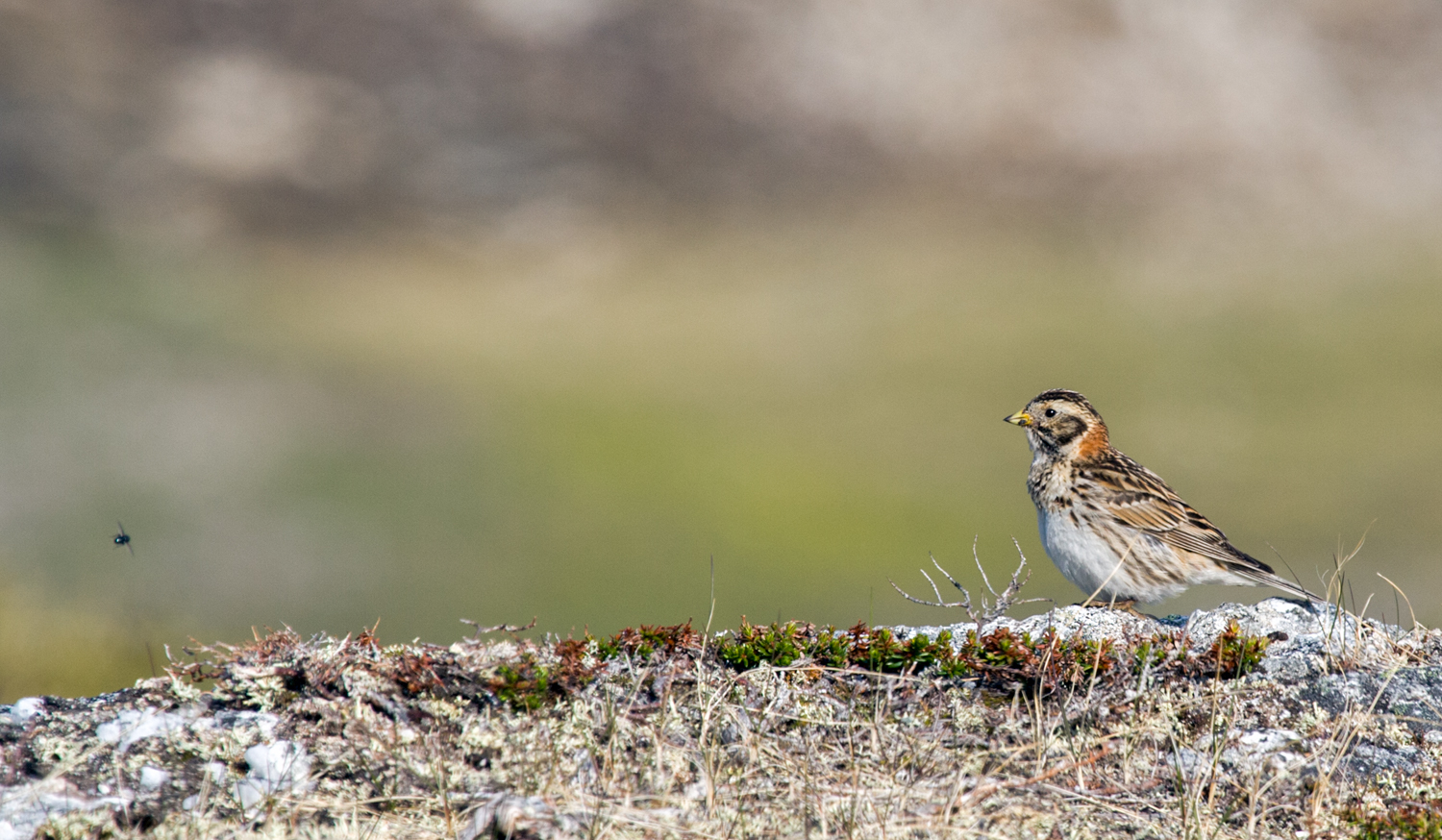
Lapland longspur, Jokkmokk Municipality, Lapland

== Old World buntings ==
Order: Passeriformes Family: Emberizidae

Emberizidae is a family of passerine birds containing a single genus, occurring throughout Europe, Asia, and Africa. They are medium-small omnivorous birds, feeding on seeds for most of the year, but on insects in the breeding season.

- Pallas's reed bunting (dvärgsävsparv) Emberiza pallasi (R)
- Common reed bunting (sävsparv) Emberiza schoeniclus (B)
- Yellow-browed bunting (gulbrynad sparv) Emberiza chrysophrys (R)
- Yellow-breasted bunting (gyllensparv) Emberiza aureola (R)
- Little bunting (dvärgsparv) Emberiza pusilla (B)
- Rustic bunting (videsparv) Emberiza rustica (B)
- Black-faced bunting (gråhuvad sparv) Emberiza spodocephala (R)
- Black-headed bunting (svarthuvad sparv) Emberiza melanocephala (R)
- Corn bunting (kornsparv) Emberiza calandra (B)
- Chestnut-eared bunting (rödkindad sparv) Emberiza fucata (R)
- Rock bunting (klippsparv) Emberiza cia (R)
- Grey-necked bunting (bergortolan) Emberiza buchanani (R)
- Cinereous bunting (gulgrå sparv) Emberiza cineracea (R)
- Ortolan bunting (ortolansparv) Emberiza hortulana (B)
- Cretzschmar's bunting (rostsparv) Emberiza caesia (R)
- Cirl bunting (häcksparv) Emberiza cirlus (R)
- Pine bunting (tallsparv) Emberiza leucocephalos (R)
- Yellowhammer (gulsparv) Emberiza citrinella (B)
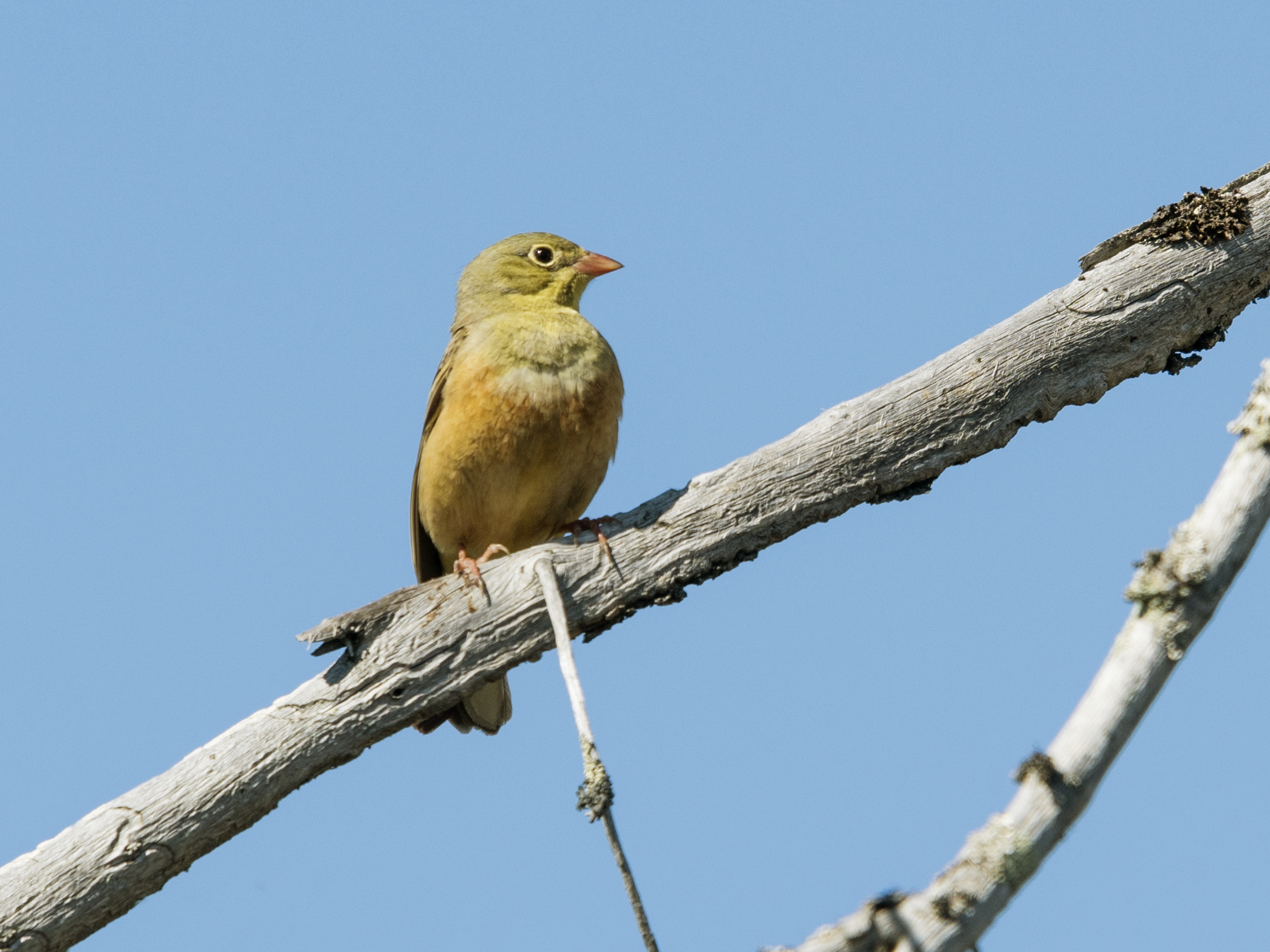
Ortolan bunting, Hörnefors, Västerbotten

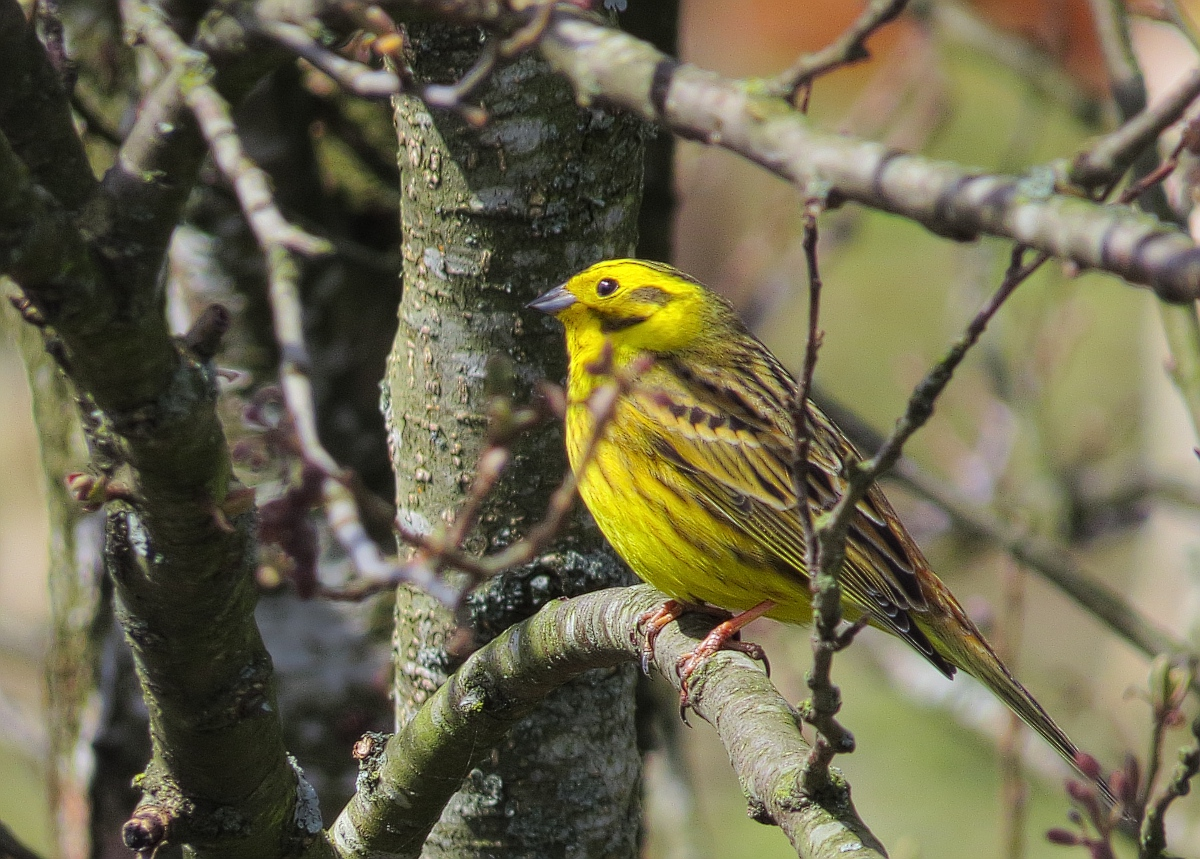
Yellowhammer, Arvika, Värmland

== New World sparrows ==
Order: Passeriformes Family: Passerellidae

Until 2017, these species were considered part of the family Emberizidae. Most of the species are known as sparrows, but these birds are not closely related to the Old World sparrows which are in the family Passeridae. Many of these have distinctive head patterns.

- American tree sparrow (tundrasparv) Spizelloides arborea (R)
- Dark-eyed junco (mörkögd junco) Junco hyemalis (R)
- White-throated sparrow (vitstrupig sparv) Zonotrichia albicollis (R)
- Song sparrow (sångsparv) Melospiza melodia (R)

== Troupials and allies ==
Order: Passeriformes Family: Icteridae

The icterids are a group of small to medium-sized passerine birds restricted to the New World and include the grackles, New World blackbirds, and New World orioles. Most species have black as a predominant plumage colour, often enlivened by yellow, orange, or red.

- Baltimore oriole (baltimoretrupial) Icterus galbula (R)

== Cardinals and allies ==
Order: Passeriformes Family: Cardinalidae

The cardinals are a family of robust seed-eating birds with strong bills. They are typically associated with open woodland. The sexes usually have distinct plumages.

- Rose-breasted grosbeak (brokig kardinal) Pheucticus ludovicianus (R)

== See also ==
- List of mammals of Sweden
- List of birds
- Lists of birds by region
