= List of birds of Denmark =

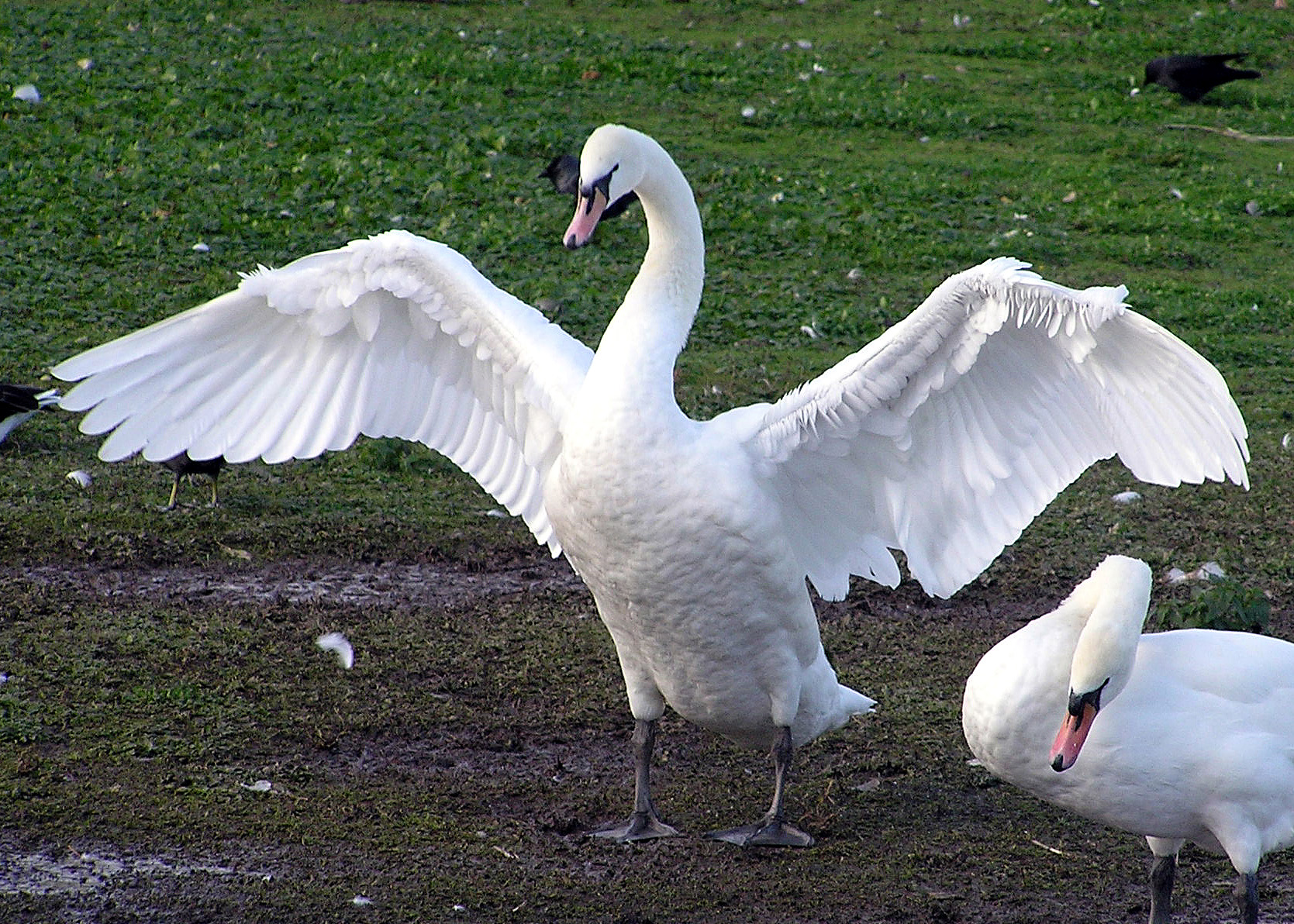
The mute swan is the national bird of Denmark.

This is a list of the bird species recorded in Denmark. The avifauna of Denmark included a total of 504 species recorded in the wild by according to the Dansk Ornitologisk Forening (DOF; Danish Ornithological Society)'s DK listen (this list uses only Danish names, with the English names below abstracted from the DOF's Western Palaearctic list.) This list's taxonomic treatment (designation and sequence of orders, families and species) and nomenclature (English and scientific names) are those of the IOC World Bird List, 2022 edition.

Bird species admitted to the Danish List are included in the following categories A, B or C, with the same definitions as the British and other Western Palaearctic bird lists:

- A: species that have been recorded in an apparently natural state at least once since 1 January 1950.
- B: species that were recorded in an apparently natural state at least once between 1 January 1800 and 31 December 1949, but have not been recorded subsequently.
- C: species introduced by humans, and have established breeding populations derived from introduced stock, which maintain themselves without necessary recourse to further introduction.
- Species marked with a * are rare species which require acceptance by the Sjældenheds Udvalget (SU; the Danish Rarities Committee).

== Grouse, pheasants, and allies ==
Order: Galliformes Family: Phasianidae

These are terrestrial species of game birds, feeding and nesting on the ground. They are variable in size but generally plump, with broad and relatively short wings.

- Common quail (vagtel) Coturnix coturnix A
- Black grouse (urfugl) Lyrurus tetrix A*
- Grey partridge (agerhøne) Perdix perdix A
- Common pheasant (fasan) Phasianus colchicus C

== Geese, swans, and ducks ==
Order: Anseriformes Family: Anatidae

Anatidae includes the ducks and most duck-like waterfowl, such as geese and swans. These birds are adapted to an aquatic existence with webbed feet, flattened bills, and feathers that are excellent at shedding water due to an oily coating.

- Brant goose (knortegås) Branta bernicla A
- Red-breasted goose (rødhalset gås) Branta ruficollis A
- Canada goose (canadagås) Branta canadensis C
- Barnacle goose (bramgås) Branta leucopsis A
- Bar-headed goose (indisk gås) Anser indicus C
- Ross's goose (dværgsnegås) Anser rossii A*
- Greylag goose (grågås) Anser anser A
- Taiga bean goose (tajgasædgås) Anser fabalis A
- Pink-footed goose (kortnæbbet gås) Anser brachyrhynchus A
- Tundra bean goose (tundrasædgås) Anser serrirostris A
- Greater white-fronted goose (blisgås) Anser albifrons A
- Lesser white-fronted goose (dværggås) Anser erythropus A
- Black swan (sortsvane) Cygnus atratus C
- Mute swan (knopsvane) Cygnus olor A
- Tundra swan (pibesvane) Cygnus columbianus A
- Whooper swan (sangsvane) Cygnus cygnus A
- Egyptian goose (nilgås) Alopochen aegyptiacus C
- Common shelduck (gravand) Tadorna tadorna A
- Ruddy shelduck (rustand) Tadorna ferruginea A
- Mandarin duck (mandarinand) Aix galericulata C
- Baikal teal (sibirisk krikand) Sibirionetta formosa A*
- Garganey (atlingand) Spatula querquedula A
- Blue-winged teal (blåvinget and) Spatula discors A*
- Northern shoveler (skeand) Spatula clypeata A
- Gadwall (knarand) Mareca strepera A
- Eurasian wigeon (pibeand) Mareca penelope A
- American wigeon (amerikansk pibeand) Mareca americana A*
- Mallard (gråand) Anas platyrhynchos A
- American black duck (sortbrun and) Anas rubripes A*
- Northern pintail (spidsand) Anas acuta A
- Eurasian teal (krikand) Anas crecca A
- Green-winged teal (amerikansk krikand) Anas carolinensis A
- Red-crested pochard (rødhovedet and) Netta rufina A
- Common pochard (taffeland) Aythya ferina A
- Ferruginous duck (hvidøjet and) Aythya nyroca A*
- Ring-necked duck (halsbåndstroldand) Aythya collaris A*
- Tufted duck (troldand) Aythya fuligula A
- Greater scaup (bjergand) Aythya marila A
- Lesser scaup (lille bjergand) Aythya affinis A*
- Steller's eider (stellersand) Polysticta stelleri A*
- King eider (kongeederfugl) Somateria spectabilis A
- Common eider (ederfugl) Somateria mollissima A
- Surf scoter (brilleand) Melanitta perspicillata A*
- Velvet scoter (fløjlsand) Melanitta fusca A
- White-winged scoter (amerikansk fløjlsand) Melanitta deglandi A*
- Stejneger's scoter (sibirisk fløjlsand) Melanitta stejnegeri A*
- Common scoter (sortand) Melanitta nigra A
- Black scoter (amerikansk sortand) Melanitta americana A*
- Long-tailed duck (havlit) Clangula hyemalis A
- Common goldeneye (hvinand) Bucephala clangula A
- Smew (lille skallesluger) Mergellus albellus A
- Goosander (stor skallesluger) Mergus merganser A
- Red-breasted merganser (toppet skallesluger) Mergus serrator A
- Ruddy duck (amerikansk skarveand) Oxyura jamaicensis C*
- White-headed duck (hvidhovedet and) Oxyura leucocephala A*

== Nightjars ==
Order: Caprimulgiformes Family: Caprimulgidae

Nightjars are medium-sized nocturnal birds that usually nest on the ground. They have long wings, short legs, and very short bills. Most have small feet, of little use for walking, and long pointed wings. Their soft plumage is camouflaged to resemble bark or leaves.

- Eurasian nightjar (natravn) Caprimulgus europaeus A
- Egyptian nightjar (ørkennatravn) Caprimulgus aegyptius A*

== Swifts ==
Order: Caprimulgiformes Family: Apodidae

Swifts are small birds which spend the majority of their lives flying. They have very short legs and never settle voluntarily on the ground, perching instead only on vertical surfaces. Swifts have long swept-back wings which resemble a crescent.

- White-throated needletail (tornhalesejler) Hirundapus caudacutus A*
- Alpine swift (alpesejler) Tachymarptis melba A*
- Common swift (mursejler) Apus apus A
- Pallid swift (gråsejler) Apus pallidus A*
- Pacific swift (orientsejler) Apus pacificus A*
- Little swift (lille sejler) Apus affinis A*
- White-rumped swift (kaffersejler) Apus caffer A*

== Bustards ==
Order: Otidiformes Family: Otididae

Bustards are large terrestrial birds mainly associated with dry open country and steppes in the Old World. They are omnivorous and nest on the ground. They walk steadily on strong legs and big toes, pecking for food as they go. They have long broad wings with "fingered" wingtips and striking patterns in flight. Many have interesting mating displays.

- Great bustard (stortrappe) Otis tarda A*
- MacQueen's bustard (østlig kravetrappe) Chlamydotis macqueenii B*
- Little bustard (dværgtrappe) Tetrax tetrax A*

== Cuckoos ==
Order: Cuculiformes Family: Cuculidae

The family Cuculidae includes cuckoos and allies. These birds are of variable size with slender bodies, long tails, and strong legs. The Old World cuckoos are brood parasites.

- Great spotted cuckoo (skadegøg) Clamator glandarius A*
- Yellow-billed cuckoo (gulnæbbet gøg) Coccyzus americanus B*
- Black-billed cuckoo (sortnæbbet gøg) Coccyzus erythropthalmus A*
- Common cuckoo (gøg) Cuculus canorus A

== Sandgrouse ==
Order: Pterocliformes Family: Pteroclidae

Sandgrouse have small pigeon-like heads and necks, but sturdy compact bodies. They have long pointed wings and sometimes tails and a fast direct flight. Flocks fly to watering holes at dawn and dusk. Their legs are feathered down to the toes.

- Pallas's sandgrouse (steppehøne) Syrrhaptes paradoxus A*

== Pigeons and doves ==
Order: Columbiformes Family: Columbidae

Pigeons and doves are stout-bodied birds with short necks and short slender bills with a fleshy cere.

- Rock dove (klippedue) Columba livia C
- Stock dove (huldue) Columba oenas A
- Common wood pigeon (ringdue) Columba palumbus A
- European turtle dove (turteldue) Streptopelia turtur A
- Oriental turtle dove (østlig turteldue) Streptopelia orientalis A*
- Eurasian collared dove (tyrkerdue) Streptopelia decaocto A
- Mourning dove (sørgedue) Zenaida macroura A*

== Rails, moorhens, and coots ==
Order: Gruiformes Family: Rallidae

Rallidae is a large family of small to medium-sized birds which includes the rails, crakes, coots, and moorhens. Typically they inhabit dense vegetation in damp environments near lakes, swamps, or rivers. Many are shy and secretive birds, making them difficult to observe. Most species have strong legs and long toes which are well adapted to soft uneven surfaces. They tend to have short, rounded wings and to be weak fliers.

- Water rail (vandrikse) Rallus aquaticus A
- Corn crake (engsnarre) Crex crex A
- Little crake (lille rørvagtel) Zapornia parva A*
- Baillon's crake (dværgrørvagtel) Zapornia pusilla A*
- Spotted crake (plettet rørvagtel) Porzana porzana A
- Allen's gallinule (lille sultanhøne) Porphyrula alleni B*
- Common moorhen (grønbenet rørhøne) Gallinula chloropus A
- Eurasian coot (blishøne) Fulica atra A

== Cranes ==
Order: Gruiformes Family: Gruidae

Cranes are large, long-legged, and long-necked birds. Unlike the similar-looking but unrelated herons, cranes fly with necks outstretched, not pulled back. Most have elaborate and noisy courting displays.

- Sandhill crane (prærietrane) Antigone canadensis A*
- Demoiselle crane (jomfrutrane) Anthropoides virgo A*
- Common crane (trane) Grus grus A

== Grebes ==
Order: Podicipediformes Family: Podicipedidae

Grebes are small to medium-large freshwater diving birds. They have lobed toes and are excellent swimmers and divers. However, their feet are placed far back on the body, making them ungainly on land.

- Little grebe (lille lappedykker) Tachybaptus ruficollis A
- Red-necked grebe (gråstrubet lappedykker) Podiceps grisegena A
- Great crested grebe (toppet lappedykker) Podiceps cristatus A
- Slavonian grebe (nordisk lappedykker) Podiceps auritus A
- Black-necked grebe (sorthalset lappedykker) Podiceps nigricollis A

== Stone-curlews ==
Order: Charadriiformes Family: Burhinidae

Stone-curlews and thick-knees are a group of waders found worldwide within the tropical zone, with some also breeding in temperate Europe and Australia. They are medium to large waders with strong black or yellow-black bills, large yellow eyes, and cryptic plumage. Despite being classed as waders, most species have a preference for arid or semi-arid habitats.

- Eurasian stone-curlew (triel) Burhinus oedicnemus A*

== Oystercatchers ==
Order: Charadriiformes Family: Haematopodidae

The oystercatchers are large and noisy plover-like birds, with strong bills used for smashing or prising open molluscs.

- Eurasian oystercatcher (strandskade) Haematopus ostralegus A

== Stilts and avocets ==
Order: Charadriiformes Family: Recurvirostridae

Recurvirostridae is a family of large wading birds which includes the avocets and stilts. The avocets have long legs and long up-curved bills. The stilts have extremely long legs and long, thin, straight bills.

- Black-winged stilt (stylteløber) Himantopus himantopus A*
- Pied avocet (klyde) Recurvirostra avosetta A

== Plovers and lapwings ==
Order: Charadriiformes Family: Charadriidae

The family Charadriidae includes the plovers, dotterels, and lapwings. They are small to medium-sized birds with compact bodies, short thick necks, and long, usually pointed, wings. They are found in open country worldwide, mostly in habitats near water.

- Northern lapwing (vibe) Vanellus vanellus A
- Sociable lapwing (steppevibe) Vanellus gregarius A*
- White-tailed lapwing (sumpvibe) Vanellus leucurus A*
- European golden plover (hjejle) Pluvialis apricaria A
- Pacific golden plover (sibirisk hjejle) Pluvialis fulva A*
- American golden plover (amerikansk hjejle) Pluvialis dominica A*
- Grey plover (strandhjejle) Pluvialis squatarola A
- Common ringed plover (stor præstekrave) Charadrius hiaticula A
- Little ringed plover (lille præstekrave) Charadrius dubius A
- Kentish plover (hvidbrystet præstekrave) Charadrius alexandrinus A
- Siberian sand plover (sibirisk præstekrave) Charadrius mongolus A*
- Tibetan sand plover (tibetansk præstekrave) Charadrius atrifrons A*
- Greater sand plover (ørkenpræstekrave) Charadrius leschenaultii A*
- Caspian plover (kaspisk præstekrave) Charadrius asiaticus A*
- Eurasian dotterel (pomeransfugl) Charadrius morinellus A

== Sandpipers and allies ==
Order: Charadriiformes Family: Scolopacidae

Scolopacidae is a large diverse family of small to medium-sized shorebirds including sandpipers, curlews, godwits, shanks, woodcocks, snipe, dowitchers, and phalaropes. The majority of these species eat small invertebrates picked out of the mud or soil. Variation in length of legs and bills enables multiple species to feed in the same habitat, particularly on the coast, without direct competition for food.

- Upland sandpiper (bartramsklire) Bartramia longicauda A*
- Eurasian whimbrel (småspove) Numenius phaeopus A
- Eurasian curlew (storspove) Numenius arquata A
- Bar-tailed godwit (lille kobbersneppe) Limosa lapponica A
- Black-tailed godwit (stor kobbersneppe) Limosa limosa A
- Hudsonian godwit (canadisk kobbersneppe) Limosa haemastica A*
- Ruddy turnstone (stenvender) Arenaria interpres A
- Red knot (islandsk ryle) Calidris canutus A
- Ruff (brushane) Calidris pugnax A
- Broad-billed sandpiper (kærløber) Calidris falcinellus A
- Sharp-tailed sandpiper (spidshalet ryle) Calidris acuminata A*
- Stilt sandpiper (klireryle) Calidris himantopus A*
- Curlew sandpiper (krumnæbbet ryle) Calidris ferruginea A
- Temminck's stint (temmincksryle) Calidris temminckii A
- Red-necked stint (rødhalset ryle) Calidris ruficollis A*
- Sanderling (sandløber) Calidris alba A
- Dunlin (almindelig ryle) Calidris alpina A
- Purple sandpiper (sortgrå ryle) Calidris maritima A
- Baird's sandpiper (bairdsryle) Calidris bairdii A*
- Little stint (dværgryle) Calidris minuta A
- White-rumped sandpiper (hvidrygget ryle) Calidris fuscicollis A*
- Buff-breasted sandpiper (prærieløber) Calidris subruficollis A*
- Pectoral sandpiper (stribet ryle) Calidris melanotos A
- Semipalmated sandpiper (tyknæbbet dværgryle) Calidris pusilla A*
- Long-billed dowitcher (langnæbbet sneppeklire) Limnodromus scolopaceus A*
- Eurasian woodcock (skovsneppe) Scolopax rusticola A
- Jack snipe (enkeltbekkasin) Lymnocryptes minimus A
- Great snipe (tredækker) Gallinago media A
- Common snipe (dobbeltbekkasin) Gallinago gallinago A
- Terek sandpiper (terekklire) Xenus cinereus A*
- Wilson's phalarope (amerikansk svømmesneppe) Phalaropus tricolor A*
- Red-necked phalarope (odinshane) Phalaropus lobatus A
- Grey phalarope (thorshane) Phalaropus fulicarius A
- Common sandpiper (mudderklire) Actitis hypoleucos A
- Spotted sandpiper (plettet mudderklire) Actitis macularius A*
- Green sandpiper (svaleklire) Tringa ochropus A
- Lesser yellowlegs (lille gulben) Tringa flavipes A*
- Common redshank (rødben) Tringa totanus A
- Marsh sandpiper (damklire) Tringa stagnatilis A
- Wood sandpiper (tinksmed) Tringa glareola A
- Spotted redshank (sortklire) Tringa erythropus A
- Common greenshank (hvidklire) Tringa nebularia A
- Greater yellowlegs (stor gulben) Tringa melanoleuca A*

== Pratincoles and coursers ==
Order: Charadriiformes Family: Glareolidae

Glareolidae is a family of wading birds comprising the pratincoles, which have short legs, long pointed wings, and long forked tails, and the coursers, which have long legs, short wings, and long, pointed bills that curve downwards.

- Cream-coloured courser (ørkenløber) Cursorius cursor A*
- Collared pratincole (rødvinget braksvale) Glareola pratincola A*
- Oriental pratincole (orientbraksvale) Glareola maldivarum A*
- Black-winged pratincole (sortvinget braksvale) Glareola nordmanni A*

== Gulls and terns ==
Order: Charadriiformes Family: Laridae

Laridae is a family of medium to large seabirds and includes gulls, terns, and allies. Gulls are typically white with grey wings, often with black markings on the wingtips, and the head white or dark in breeding plumage. They have stout, longish, bills and webbed feet. Terns are a group of generally smaller to medium seabirds typically white with grey wings, often with black cap on the head; some darker overall. Most terns hunt fish by diving but some pick insects off the surface of fresh water. Gulls and terns are generally long-lived birds, with several species known to live more than 30 years.

- Black-legged kittiwake (ride) Rissa tridactyla A
- Ivory gull (ismåge) Pagophila eburnea A*
- Sabine's gull (sabinemåge) Xema sabini A
- Slender-billed gull (tyndnæbbet måge) Chroicocephalus genei A*
- Bonaparte's gull (bonapartemåge) Chroicocephalus philadelphia A*
- Black-headed gull (hættemåge) Chroicocephalus ridibundus A
- Little gull (dværgmåge) Hydrocoloeus minutus A
- Ross's gull (rosenmåge) Rhodostethia rosea A*
- Laughing gull (lattermåge) Leucophaeus atricilla A*
- Franklin's gull (præriemåge) Leucophaeus pipixcan A*
- Audouin's gull (audouinsmåge) Ichthyaetus audouinii A*
- Mediterranean gull (sorthovedet måge) Ichthyaetus melanocephalus A
- Pallas's gull (stor sorthovedet måge) Ichthyaetus ichthyaetus A*
- Common gull (stormmåge) Larus canus A
- Ring-billed gull (ringnæbbet måge) Larus delawarensis A*
- Great black-backed gull (svartbag) Larus marinus A
- Glaucous-winged gull (gråvinget måge) Larus glaucescens A*
- Glaucous gull (gråmåge) Larus hyperboreus A
- Iceland gull (hvidvinget måge) Larus glaucoides A
- European herring gull (sølvmåge) Larus argentatus A
- Caspian gull (kaspisk måge) Larus cachinnans A
- Yellow-legged gull (middelhavssølvmåge) Larus michahellis A
- Armenian gull (armensk måge) Larus armenicus A*
- Lesser black-backed gull (sildemåge) Larus fuscus A
- Gull-billed tern (sandterne) Gelochelidon nilotica A
- Caspian tern (rovterne) Hydroprogne caspia A
- Sandwich tern (splitterne) Thalasseus sandvicensis A
- Elegant tern (aztekerterne) Thalasseus elegans A*
- Little tern (dværgterne) Sternula albifrons A
- Bridled tern (brilleterne) Onychoprion anaethetus A*
- Roseate tern (rosenterne) Sterna dougallii A*
- Common tern (fjordterne) Sterna hirundo A
- Arctic tern (havterne) Sterna paradisaea A
- Whiskered tern (hvidskægget terne) Chlidonias hybrida A*
- White-winged tern (hvidvinget terne) Chlidonias leucopterus A
- Black tern (sortterne) Chlidonias niger A

== Skuas ==
Order: Charadriiformes Family: Stercorariidae

The skuas are medium to large predatory or kleptoparasitic seabirds, typically with brown plumage, often with creamy-white underparts and white streaks on the primary feathers. They nest on the ground in subarctic and arctic regions and most are long-distance migrants.

- Great skua (storkjove) Stercorarius skua A
- Pomarine skua (mellemkjove) Stercorarius pomarinus A
- Arctic skua (almindelig kjove) Stercorarius parasiticus A
- Long-tailed skua (lille kjove) Stercorarius longicaudus A

== Auks, guillemots, and puffins ==
Order: Charadriiformes Family: Alcidae

Alcidae is a family of seabirds which are superficially similar to penguins with their black-and-white colour, their upright posture, and some of their habits, but which can fly.

- Little auk (søkonge) Alle alle A
- Brünnich's guillemot (polarlomvie) Uria lomvia A*
- Common guillemot (lomvie) Uria aalge A
- Razorbill (alk) Alca torda A
- Black guillemot (tejst) Cepphus grylle A
- Atlantic puffin (lunde) Fratercula arctica A

== Divers ==
Order: Gaviiformes Family: Gaviidae

Divers or loons are a group of aquatic birds found in arctic and cool temperate parts of the Northern Hemisphere. They are the size of large ducks or small geese, but to which they are completely unrelated. In particular, their legs are set very far back which assists in swimming underwater but makes walking on land extremely difficult.

- Red-throated diver (rødstrubet lom) Gavia stellata A
- Black-throated diver (sortstrubet lom) Gavia arctica A
- Pacific diver (stillehavslom) Gavia pacifica A*
- Great northern diver (islom) Gavia immer A
- White-billed diver (hvidnæbbet lom) Gavia adamsii A

== Southern storm petrels ==
Order: Procellariiformes Family: Oceanitidae

The austral storm petrels are relatives of the petrels and are the smallest seabirds. They feed on planktonic crustaceans and small fish picked from the surface, typically while hovering.

- Wilson's storm petrel (wilsons stormsvale) Oceanites oceanicus A*

== Albatrosses ==
Order: Procellariiformes Family: Diomedeidae

The albatrosses are oceanic seabirds, among the largest of flying birds; the great albatrosses of the genus Diomedea have the largest wingspans of any extant bird.

- Black-browed albatross (sortbrynet albatros) Thalassarche melanophris A*

== Northern storm petrels ==
Order: Procellariiformes Family: Hydrobatidae

Though the members of this family are similar in many respects to the southern storm petrels, including their general appearance and habits, there are enough genetic differences to warrant their placement in a separate family.

- European storm petrel (lille stormsvale) Hydrobates pelagicus A
- Leach's storm petrel (stor stormsvale) Hydrobates leucorhous A

== Shearwaters and petrels ==
Order: Procellariiformes Family: Procellariidae

The procellariids are the main group of medium-sized petrels and shearwaters, characterised by united nostrils with medium septum and a long functional outer primary.

- Northern fulmar (mallemuk) Fulmarus glacialis A
- Scopoli's shearwater (scopolis skråpe) Calonectris diomedea A*
- Cory's shearwater (atlantisk skråpe) Calonectris borealis A*
- Sooty shearwater (sodfarvet skråpe) Ardenna grisea A
- Great shearwater (storskråpe) Ardenna gravis A*
- Manx shearwater (almindelig skråpe) Puffinus puffinus A
- Balearic shearwater (balearskråpe) Puffinus mauretanicus A*
- Audubon's shearwater (tropeskråpe) Puffinus lherminieri A*

== Storks ==
Order: Ciconiiformes Family: Ciconiidae

Storks are large, long-legged, long-necked, wading birds with long, stout bills. Storks are mute, but bill-clattering is an important mode of communication at the nest. Their nests can be large and may be reused for many years. Many species are migratory.

- Black stork (sort stork) Ciconia nigra A
- White stork (hvid stork) Ciconia ciconia A

== Frigatebirds ==
Order: Suliformes Family: Fregatidae

Frigatebirds are large seabirds usually found over tropical oceans. They are large, black, or black-and-white, with long wings and deeply forked tails. The males have coloured inflatable throat pouches. They do not swim or walk and cannot take off from a flat surface. Having the largest wingspan-to-body-weight ratio of any bird, they are essentially aerial, able to stay aloft for more than a week.

- Magnificent frigatebird (pragtfregatfugl) Fregata magnificens A*

== Gannets and boobies ==
Order: Suliformes Family: Sulidae

The sulids comprise the gannets and boobies. Both groups are medium-large coastal seabirds that plunge-dive for fish.

- Northern gannet (sule) Morus bassanus A
- Brown booby (brun sule) Sula leucogaster A*

== Cormorants and shags ==
Order: Suliformes Family: Phalacrocoracidae

Cormorants and shags are medium-to-large aquatic birds, usually with mainly dark plumage and areas of coloured skin on the face. The bill is long, thin and sharply hooked. Their feet are four-toed and webbed.

- Pygmy cormorant (dværgskarv) Microcarbo pygmaeus A*
- European shag (topskarv) Gulosus aristotelis A*
- Great cormorant (skarv) Phalacrocorax carbo A

== Ibises and spoonbills ==
Order: Pelecaniformes Family: Threskiornithidae

The family Threskiornithidae includes the ibises and spoonbills. They have long, broad wings. Their bodies tend to be elongated, the neck more so, with rather long legs. The bill is also long, decurved in the case of the ibises, straight and distinctively flattened in the spoonbills.

- Glossy ibis (sort ibis) Plegadis falcinellus A*
- Eurasian spoonbill (skestork) Platalea leucorodia A

== Herons, egrets, and bitterns ==
Order: Pelecaniformes Family: Ardeidae

The family Ardeidae contains the herons, egrets, and bitterns. Herons and egrets are medium to large wading birds with long necks and legs. Bitterns tend to be shorter-necked and more secretive. Members of Ardeidae fly with their necks retracted, unlike other long-necked birds such as storks, ibises and spoonbills.

- Eurasian bittern (rørdrum) Botaurus stellaris A
- American bittern (amerikansk rørdrum) Botaurus lentiginosus A*
- Little bittern (dværghejre) Ixobrychus minutus A*
- Black-crowned night heron (nathejre) Nycticorax nycticorax A*
- Squacco heron (tophejre) Ardeola ralloides A*
- Cattle egret (kohejre) Bubulcus ibis A*
- Grey heron (fiskehejre) Ardea cinerea A
- Purple heron (purpurhejre) Ardea purpurea A*
- Great egret (sølvhejre) Ardea alba A
- Little egret (silkehejre) Egretta garzetta A

== Pelicans ==
Order: Pelecaniformes Family: Pelecanidae

Pelicans are very large water birds with a distinctive pouch under their beak. Like other birds in the order Pelecaniformes, they have four webbed toes.

- Dalmatian pelican (krøltoppet pelikan) Pelecanus crispus A*

== Osprey ==
Order: Accipitriformes Family: Pandionidae

Pandionidae is a family of fish-eating birds of prey, possessing a very large, powerful hooked beak for tearing fish apart, strong legs, powerful talons, and keen eyesight. The family is monotypic.

- Osprey (fiskeørn) Pandion haliaetus A

== Hawks, eagles, and kites ==
Order: Accipitriformes Family: Accipitridae

Accipitridae is a family of birds of prey and includes hawks, eagles, kites, harriers, and Old World vultures. These birds have very large powerful hooked beaks for tearing flesh from their prey, strong legs, powerful talons, and keen eyesight.

- Black-winged kite (blå glente) Elanus caeruleus A*
- Egyptian vulture (ådselgrib) Neophron percnopterus A*
- European honey-buzzard (hvepsevåge) Pernis apivorus A
- Griffon vulture (gåsegrib) Gyps fulvus A*
- Short-toed snake eagle (slangeørn) Circaetus gallicus A*
- Lesser spotted eagle (lille skrigeørn) Clanga pomarina A
- Greater spotted eagle (stor skrigeørn) Clanga clanga A*
- Booted eagle (dværgørn) Hieraaetus pennatus A*
- Steppe eagle (steppeørn) Aquila nipalensis A*
- Eastern imperial eagle (kejserørn) Aquila heliaca A*
- Golden eagle (kongeørn) Aquila chrysaetos A
- Bonelli's eagle (høgeørn) Aquila fasciata A*
- Eurasian sparrowhawk (spurvehøg) Accipiter nisus A
- Northern goshawk (duehøg) Accipiter gentilis A
- Eurasian marsh harrier (rørhøg) Circus aeruginosus A
- Hen harrier (blå kærhøg) Circus cyaneus A
- Northern harrier (amerikansk kærhøg) Circus hudsonius A*
- Pallid harrier (steppehøg) Circus macrourus A
- Montagu's harrier (hedehøg) Circus pygargus A
- Red kite (rød glente) Milvus milvus A
- Black kite (sort glente) Milvus migrans A
- White-tailed eagle (havørn) Haliaeetus albicilla A
- Rough-legged buzzard (fjeldvåge) Buteo lagopus A
- Long-legged buzzard (ørnevåge) Buteo rufinus A*
- Common buzzard (musvåge) Buteo buteo A

== Barn owls ==
Order: Strigiformes Family: Tytonidae

Barn owls are medium to large owls with large heads and characteristic heart-shaped faces. They have long strong legs with powerful talons.

- Western barn owl (slørugle) Tyto alba A

== Owls ==
Order: Strigiformes Family: Strigidae

Typical owls are small to large solitary nocturnal birds of prey. They have large forward-facing eyes and ears, a hawk-like beak, and a conspicuous circle of feathers around each eye called a facial disk.

- Eurasian scops owl (dværghornugle) Otus scops A*
- Snowy owl (sneugle) Bubo scandiacus A*
- Eurasian eagle-owl (stor hornugle) Bubo bubo C
- Tawny owl (natugle) Strix aluco A
- Northern hawk owl (høgeugle) Surnia ulula A*
- Eurasian pygmy owl (spurveugle) Glaucidium passerinum A*
- Little owl (kirkeugle) Athene noctua A
- Tengmalm's owl (perleugle) Aegolius funereus A
- Long-eared owl (skovhornugle) Asio otus A
- Short-eared owl (mosehornugle) Asio flammeus A

== Hoopoes ==
Order: Bucerotiformes Family: Upupidae

Hoopoes have black, white and orangey-pink colouring with a large erectile crest on the head.

- Eurasian hoopoe (hærfugl) Upupa epops A

== Rollers ==
Order: Coraciiformes Family: Coraciidae

Rollers resemble crows in size and build, but are more closely related to the kingfishers and bee-eaters. They share the colourful appearance of those groups with blues and browns predominating. The two inner front toes are connected, but the outer toe is not.

- European roller (ellekrage) Coracias garrulus A*

== Kingfishers ==
Order: Coraciiformes Family: Alcedinidae

Kingfishers are medium-sized birds with large heads, long, pointed bills, short legs and stubby tails.

- Common kingfisher (isfugl) Alcedo atthis A

== Bee-eaters ==
Order: Coraciiformes Family: Meropidae

The bee-eaters are a group of coraciiform birds in the family Meropidae. They are characterised by richly coloured plumage, slender bodies and usually elongated central tail feathers. All have long downturned bills and pointed wings, which give them a swallow-like appearance when seen from afar.

- Blue-cheeked bee-eater (grøn biæder) Merops persicus A*
- European bee-eater (biæder) Merops apiaster A

== Woodpeckers ==
Order: Piciformes Family: Picidae

Woodpeckers are small to medium-sized birds with chisel-like beaks, short legs, stiff tails and long tongues used for capturing insects. Some species have feet with two toes pointing forward and two backward, while several species have only three toes. Many woodpeckers have the habit of tapping noisily on tree trunks with their beaks.

- Eurasian wryneck (vendehals) Jynx torquilla A
- Eurasian three-toed woodpecker (tretået spætte) Picoides tridactylus A*
- Middle spotted woodpecker (mellemflagspætte) Dendrocoptes medius A*
- Lesser spotted woodpecker (lille flagspætte) Dryobates minor A
- Great spotted woodpecker (stor flagspætte) Dendrocopos major A
- Northern flicker (guldspætte) Colaptes auratus A*
- Black woodpecker (sortspætte) Dryocopus martius A
- Eurasian green woodpecker (grønspætte) Picus viridis A

== Falcons ==
Order: Falconiformes Family: Falconidae

Falconidae is a family of diurnal birds of prey. They differ from hawks, eagles and kites in that they often kill with their beaks instead of their talons.

- Lesser kestrel (lille tårnfalk) Falco naumanni A*
- Eurasian kestrel (tårnfalk) Falco tinnunculus A
- American kestrel (amerikansk tårnfalk) Falco sparverius B*
- Red-footed falcon (aftenfalk) Falco vespertinus A
- Eleonora's falcon (eleonorafalk) Falco eleonorae A*
- Merlin (dværgfalk) Falco columbarius A
- Eurasian hobby (lærkefalk) Falco subbuteo A
- Saker falcon (slagfalk) Falco cherrug A*
- Gyrfalcon (jagtfalk) Falco rusticolus A*
- Peregrine falcon (vandrefalk) Falco peregrinus A

== Shrikes ==
Order: Passeriformes Family: Laniidae

Shrikes are passerine birds known for their habit of catching other birds and small animals and impaling the uneaten portions of their bodies on thorns. A shrike's beak is hooked, like that of a typical bird of prey.

- Brown shrike (brun tornskade) Lanius cristatus A*
- Red-backed shrike (rødrygget tornskade) Lanius collurio A
- Red-tailed shrike (turkestantornskade) Lanius phoenicuroides A*
- Long-tailed shrike (langhalet tornskade) Lanius schach A*
- Lesser grey shrike (rosenbrystet tornskade) Lanius minor A*
- Great grey shrike (stor tornskade) Lanius excubitor A
- Woodchat shrike (rødhovedet tornskade) Lanius senator A*

== Vireos and allies ==
Order: Passeriformes Family: Vireonidae

The vireos are a group of small to medium-sized passerine birds. They are typically greenish in colour and resemble wood warblers apart from their heavier bills.

- Red-eyed vireo (rødøjet vireo) Vireo olivaceus A*

== Old World orioles ==
Order: Passeriformes Family: Oriolidae

The Old World orioles are colourful passerine birds. They are not related to the New World orioles.

- Eurasian golden oriole (pirol) Oriolus oriolus A

== Crows, jays, and magpies ==
Order: Passeriformes Family: Corvidae

The family Corvidae includes crows, ravens, jays, choughs, magpies, and nutcrackers. Corvids are above average in size among the Passeriformes, and many of the species show high levels of intelligence.

- Eurasian jay (skovskade) Garrulus glandarius A
- Eurasian magpie (husskade) Pica pica A
- Eurasian nutcracker (nøddekrige) Nucifraga caryocatactes A
- Eurasian jackdaw (allike) Coloeus monedula A
- Daurian jackdaw (sibirisk allike) Coloeus dauuricus A*
- Rook (råge) Corvus frugilegus A
- Carrion crow (sortkrage) Corvus corone A
- Hooded crow (gråkrage) Corvus cornix A
- Common raven (ravn) Corvus corax A

== Waxwings ==
Order: Passeriformes Family: Bombycillidae

The waxwings are a group of birds with soft silky plumage and unique red tips to some of the wing feathers; these tips look like sealing wax and give the group its name. These are arboreal birds of northern forests. They eat insects in summer and berries in winter.

- Bohemian waxwing (silkehale) Bombycilla garrulus A

== Tits ==
Order: Passeriformes Family: Paridae

The Paridae are mainly small stocky woodland species with short stout bills. Some have crests. They are adaptable birds, with a mixed diet including seeds and insects.

- Coal tit (sortmejse) Periparus ater A
- Crested tit (topmejse) Lophophanes cristatus A
- Marsh tit (sumpmejse) Poecile palustris A
- Willow tit (fyrremejse) Poecile montanus A
- Eurasian blue tit (blåmejse) Cyanistes caeruleus A
- Great tit (musvit) Parus major A

== Penduline tits ==
Order: Passeriformes Family: Remizidae

The penduline tits are a group of small passerine birds related to the true tits. They are insectivores.

- Eurasian penduline tit (pungmejse) Remiz pendulinus A

== Bearded reedling ==
Order: Passeriformes Family: Panuridae

This species, the only one in its family, is found in reed beds throughout temperate Europe and Asia.

- Bearded reedling (skægmejse) Panurus biarmicus A

== Larks ==
Order: Passeriformes Family: Alaudidae

Larks are small terrestrial birds with often extravagant songs and display flights. Most larks are fairly dull in appearance. Their food is insects and seeds.

- Wood lark (hedelærke) Lullula arborea A
- Eurasian skylark (sanglærke) Alauda arvensis A
- Crested lark (toplærke) Galerida cristata A
- Shore lark (bjerglærke) Eremophila alpestris A
- Greater short-toed lark (korttået lærke) Calandrella brachydactyla A*
- Bimaculated lark (østlig kalanderlærke) Melanocorypha bimaculata A*

== Swallows and martins ==
Order: Passeriformes Family: Hirundinidae

The family Hirundinidae is adapted to aerial feeding. They have a slender streamlined body, long pointed wings, and a short bill with a wide gape. The feet are adapted to perching rather than walking, and the front toes are partially joined at the base.

- Sand martin (digesvale) Riparia riparia A
- Barn swallow (landsvale) Hirundo rustica A
- Eurasian crag martin (klippesvale) Ptyonoprogne rupestris A*
- Common house martin (bysvale) Delichon urbicum A
- Red-breasted swallow (rødbrystet svale) Cecropis semirufa A*
- European red-rumped swallow (rødrygget svale) Cecropis rufula A
- Striated swallow (amursvale) Cecropis striolata A*

== Long-tailed tits ==
Order: Passeriformes Family: Aegithalidae

Long-tailed tits are a group of small passerine birds with medium to long tails. They make woven bag nests in trees. Most eat a mixed diet which includes insects.

- Long-tailed tit (halemejse) Aegithalos caudatus A

== Leaf warblers ==
Order: Passeriformes Family: Phylloscopidae

Leaf warblers are a family of small insectivorous birds found mostly in Eurasia and ranging into Wallacea and Africa. The species are small to very small, often green-plumaged above and yellow below, or more subdued with greyish-green to greyish-brown colours.

- Wood warbler (skovsanger) Phylloscopus sibilatrix A
- Western Bonelli's warbler (bjergløvsanger) Phylloscopus bonelli A*
- Hume's warbler (himalayasanger) Phylloscopus humei A*
- Yellow-browed warbler (hvidbrynet løvsanger) Phylloscopus inornatus A
- Pallas's leaf warbler (fuglekongesanger) Phylloscopus proregulus A
- Radde's warbler (schwarz' løvsanger) Phylloscopus schwarzi A*
- Sulphur-bellied warbler (sinkiangløvsanger) Phylloscopus griseolus A*
- Dusky warbler (brun løvsanger) Phylloscopus fuscatus A*
- Willow warbler (løvsanger) Phylloscopus trochilus A
- Common chiffchaff (gransanger) Phylloscopus collybita A
- Iberian chiffchaff (iberisk gransanger) Phylloscopus ibericus A*
- Green warbler (grøn sanger) Phylloscopus nitidus A*
- Two-barred warbler (østlig lundsanger) Phylloscopus plumbeitarsus A*
- Greenish warbler (lundsanger) Phylloscopus trochiloides A
- Arctic warbler (nordsanger) Phylloscopus borealis A*

== Reed warblers and allies ==
Order: Passeriformes Family: Acrocephalidae

The members of this family are usually rather large for "warblers". Most are rather plain olivaceous brown above with much yellow to beige below. They are usually found in open woodland, reedbeds, or tall grass. The family occurs mostly in southern to western Eurasia and surroundings, but it also ranges far into the Pacific, with some species in Africa.

- Great reed warbler (drosselrørsanger) Acrocephalus arundinaceus A
- Aquatic warbler (vandsanger) Acrocephalus paludicola A*
- Sedge warbler (sivsanger) Acrocephalus schoenobaenus A
- Paddyfield warbler (lille rørsanger) Acrocephalus agricola A*
- Blyth's reed warbler (buskrørsanger) Acrocephalus dumetorum A*
- Eurasian reed warbler (rørsanger) Acrocephalus scirpaceus A
- Marsh warbler (kærsanger) Acrocephalus palustris A
- Booted warbler (lille gulbug) Iduna caligata A*
- Eastern olivaceous warbler (bleg gulbug) Iduna pallida A*
- Melodious warbler (spottesanger) Hippolais polyglotta A*
- Icterine warbler (gulbug) Hippolais icterina A

== Grassbirds and allies ==
Order: Passeriformes Family: Locustellidae

Locustellidae are a family of small insectivorous songbirds found mainly in Eurasia, Africa, and the Australian region. They are smallish birds with tails that are usually long and pointed, and tend to be drab brownish or buffy all over.

- Gray's grasshopper warbler (stor græshoppesanger) Helopsaltes fasciolatus A*
- Lanceolated warbler (stribet græshoppesanger) Locustella lanceolata A*
- Common grasshopper warbler (græshoppesanger) Locustella naevia A
- River warbler (flodsanger) Locustella fluviatilis A
- Savi's warbler (savisanger) Locustella luscinioides A

== Cisticolas and allies ==
Order: Passeriformes Family: Cisticolidae

The Cisticolidae are warblers found mainly in warmer southern regions of the Old World. They are generally very small birds of drab brown or grey appearance found in open country such as grassland or scrub.

- Zitting cisticola (cistussanger) Cisticola juncidis A*

== Sylviid warblers and allies ==
Order: Passeriformes Family: Sylviidae

The family Sylviidae is a group of small insectivorous birds. They mainly occur as breeding species, as another common name (Old World warblers) implies, in Europe, Asia, and Africa. Most are of generally undistinguished appearance, but many have distinctive songs.

- Eurasian blackcap (munk) Sylvia atricapilla A
- Garden warbler (havesanger) Sylvia borin A
- Barred warbler (høgesanger) Curruca nisoria A
- Lesser whitethroat (gærdesanger) Curruca curruca A
- Asian desert warbler (asiatisk ørkensanger) Curruca nana A*
- Greater whitethroat (tornsanger) Curruca communis A
- Marmora's warbler (sardinsk sanger) Curruca sarda A*
- Eastern subalpine warbler (rødstrubet sanger) Curruca cantillans A*
- Western subalpine warbler (iberisk sanger) Curruca iberiae A*
- Moltoni's warbler (makisanger) Curruca subalpina A*
- Sardinian warbler (sorthovedet sanger) Curruca melanocephala A*
- Rüppell's warbler (sortstrubet sanger) Curruca ruppeli A*

== Crests ==
Order: Passeriformes Family: Regulidae

The crests and kinglets are a small family of birds which resemble some warblers. They are very small insectivorous birds in the single genus Regulus. The adults have a yellow to orange crown stripe, giving rise to their name.

- Common firecrest (rødtoppet fuglekonge) Regulus ignicapilla A
- Goldcrest (fuglekonge) Regulus regulus A

== Wrens ==
Order: Passeriformes Family: Troglodytidae

The wrens are mainly small and inconspicuous except for their loud songs. These birds have short wings and thin down-turned bills. Several species often hold their tails upright. All are insectivorous.

- Eurasian wren (gærdesmutte) Troglodytes troglodytes A

== Nuthatches ==
Order: Passeriformes Family: Sittidae

Nuthatches are small woodland birds. They have the unusual ability to climb down trees head first, unlike other birds which can only go upwards. Nuthatches have big heads, short tails, and powerful bills and feet.

- Eurasian nuthatch (spætmejse) Sitta europaea A

== Treecreepers ==
Order: Passeriformes Family: Certhiidae

Treecreepers are small woodland birds, brown above and white below. They have thin pointed down-curved bills, which they use to extricate insects from bark. They have stiff tail feathers, like woodpeckers, which they use to support themselves on vertical trees.

- Eurasian treecreeper (træløber) Certhia familiaris A
- Short-toed treecreeper (korttået træløber) Certhia brachydactyla A

== Starlings ==
Order: Passeriformes Family: Sturnidae

Starlings are small to medium-sized passerine birds. Their flight is strong and direct and they are very gregarious. Their preferred habitat is fairly open country. They eat insects and fruit. Their plumage is typically dark with a metallic sheen, but in some is brightly coloured.

- Rosy starling (rosenstær) Pastor roseus A
- Common starling (stær) Sturnus vulgaris A
- Spotless starling (ensfarvet stær) Sturnus unicolor A*

== Thrushes and allies ==
Order: Passeriformes Family: Turdidae

The thrushes are a family of birds with a cosmopolitan distribution. They are plump, soft-plumaged, small-to-medium-sized insectivores or omnivores, often feeding on the ground. Many have attractive songs.

- White's thrush (gulddrossel) Zoothera aurea A*
- Swainson's thrush (olivenskovdrossel) Catharus ustulatus A*
- Hermit thrush (eremitdrossel) Catharus guttatus A*
- Ring ouzel (ringdrossel) Turdus torquatus A
- Eurasian blackbird (solsort) Turdus merula A
- Eyebrowed thrush (gråstrubet drossel) Turdus obscurus A*
- Black-throated thrush (sortstrubet drossel) Turdus atrogularis A*
- Dusky thrush (brundrossel) Turdus eunomus A*
- Fieldfare (sjagger) Turdus pilaris A
- Redwing (vindrossel) Turdus iliacus A
- Song thrush (sangdrossel) Turdus philomelos A
- Mistle thrush (misteldrossel) Turdus viscivorus A
- American robin (vandredrossel) Turdus migratorius A*

== Old World flycatchers ==
Order: Passeriformes Family: Muscicapidae

Old World flycatchers are a large group of birds which are mainly small arboreal insectivores. The appearance of these birds is highly varied, but they mostly have weak songs and harsh calls.

- Spotted flycatcher (grå fluesnapper) Muscicapa striata A
- Asian brown flycatcher (brun fluesnapper) Muscicapa dauurica A*
- European robin (rødhals) Erithacus rubecula A
- Rufous-tailed robin (dværgnattergal) Larvivora sibilans A*
- Bluethroat (blåhals) Luscinia svecica A
- Thrush nightingale (nattergal) Luscinia luscinia A
- Common nightingale (sydlig nattergal) Luscinia megarhynchos A
- Siberian rubythroat (rubinnattergal) Calliope calliope A*
- Red-flanked bluetail (blåstjert) Tarsiger cyanurus A*
- European pied flycatcher (broget fluesnapper) Ficedula hypoleuca A
- Collared flycatcher (hvidhalset fluesnapper) Ficedula albicollis A
- Red-breasted flycatcher (lille fluesnapper) Ficedula parva A
- Taiga flycatcher (tajgafluesnapper) Ficedula albicilla A*
- Black redstart (husrødstjert) Phoenicurus ochruros A
- Common redstart (rødstjert) Phoenicurus phoenicurus A
- Rufous-tailed rock thrush (stendrossel) Monticola saxatilis A*
- Whinchat (bynkefugl) Saxicola rubetra A
- European stonechat (sortstrubet bynkefugl) Saxicola rubicola A
- Siberian stonechat (sibirisk bynkefugl) Saxicola maurus A*
- Amur stonechat (stejnegers bynkefugl) Saxicola stejnegeri A*
- Northern wheatear (stenpikker) Oenanthe oenanthe A
- Isabelline wheatear (isabellastenpikker) Oenanthe isabellina A*
- Desert wheatear (ørkenstenpikker) Oenanthe deserti A*
- Western black-eared wheatear (vestlig middelhavsstenpikker) Oenanthe hispanica A*
- Eastern black-eared wheatear (østlig middelhavsstenpikker) Oenanthe melanoleuca A*
- Pied wheatear (nonnestenpikker) Oenanthe pleschanka A*
- White-crowned wheatear (hvidkronet stenpikker) Oenanthe leucopyga A*

== Dippers ==
Order: Passeriformes Family: Cinclidae

Dippers are a group of perching birds whose habitat includes riverine environments in the Americas, Europe, and Asia. They are named for their bobbing or dipping movements.

- White-throated dipper (vandstær) Cinclus cinclus A

== Old World sparrows ==
Order: Passeriformes Family: Passeridae

In general, sparrows tend to be small, plump, brown birds with short tails and short powerful beaks. Sparrows are seed eaters, but they also consume small insects.

- House sparrow (gråspurv) Passer domesticus A
- Spanish sparrow (spansk spurv) Passer hispaniolensis A*
- Eurasian tree sparrow (skovspurv) Passer montanus A
- White-winged snowfinch (snefinke) Montifringilla nivalis A*

== Accentors ==
Order: Passeriformes Family: Prunellidae

The accentors and dunnocks are the only bird family which is endemic to the Palearctic. They are small, fairly drab species superficially similar to sparrows but with slender bills.

- Alpine accentor (alpejernspurv) Prunella collaris A*
- Siberian accentor (sibirisk jernspurv) Prunella montanella A*
- Black-throated accentor (sortstrubet mernspurv) Prunella atrogularis A*
- Dunnock (jernspurv) Prunella modularis A

== Wagtails and pipits ==
Order: Passeriformes Family: Motacillidae

Motacillidae is a family of small birds with medium to long tails which includes the wagtails and pipits. They are slender ground-feeding insectivores of open country.

- Western yellow wagtail (gul vipstjert) Motacilla flava A
- Eastern yellow wagtail (østlig gul vipstjert) Motacilla tschutschensis A*
- Citrine wagtail (citronvipstjert) Motacilla citreola A*
- Grey wagtail (bjergvipstjert) Motacilla cinerea A
- White wagtail (hvid vipstjert) Motacilla alba A
- Richard's pipit (storpiber) Anthus richardi A
- Blyth's pipit (mongolsk piber) Anthus godlewskii A*
- Tawny pipit (markpiber) Anthus campestris A
- Meadow pipit (engpiber) Anthus pratensis A
- Tree pipit (skovpiber) Anthus trivialis A
- Olive-backed pipit (tajgapiber) Anthus hodgsoni A*
- Red-throated pipit (rødstrubet piber) Anthus cervinus A
- Water pipit (bjergpiber) Anthus spinoletta A
- European rock pipit (skærpiber) Anthus petrosus A

== Finches, euphonias, and allies ==
Order: Passeriformes Family: Fringillidae

Finches are seed-eating birds that are small to moderately large and have a strong beak, usually conical and in some species very large. All have twelve tail feathers and nine primaries. These birds have a bouncing flight with alternating bouts of flapping and gliding on closed wings, and most sing well.

- Common chaffinch (bogfinke) Fringilla coelebs A
- Brambling (kvækerfinke) Fringilla montifringilla A
- Hawfinch (kernebider) Coccothraustes coccothraustes A
- Pine grosbeak (krognæb) Pinicola enucleator A*
- Eurasian bullfinch (dompap) Pyrrhula pyrrhula A
- Trumpeter finch (ørkendompap) Bucanetes githaginea A*
- Common rosefinch (karmindompap) Carpodacus erythrinus A
- European greenfinch (grønirisk) Chloris chloris A
- Twite (bjergirisk) Linaria flavirostris A
- Eurasian linnet (tornirisk) Linaria cannabina A
- Redpoll (gråsisken) Acanthis flammea A
- Parrot crossbill (stor korsnæb) Loxia pytyopsittacus A
- Red crossbill (lille korsnæb) Loxia curvirostra A
- Two-barred crossbill (hvidvinget korsnæb) Loxia leucoptera A
- European goldfinch (stillits) Carduelis carduelis A
- European serin (gulirisk) Serinus serinus A
- Eurasian siskin (grønsisken) Spinus spinus A

== Longspurs and snow buntings ==
Order: Passeriformes Family: Calcariidae

The Calcariidae are a family of birds that had been traditionally grouped with the buntings and New World sparrows, but differ in a number of respects and are usually found in open grassy areas.

- Lapland bunting (lapværling) Calcarius lapponicus A
- Snow bunting (snespurv) Plectrophenax nivalis A

== Buntings ==
Order: Passeriformes Family: Emberizidae

Emberizidae is a family of passerine birds containing a single genus. Until 2017, the New World sparrows, now Passerellidae, were also considered part of this family.

- Corn bunting (bomlærke) Emberiza calandra A
- Yellowhammer (gulspurv) Emberiza citrinella A
- Pine bunting (hvidkindet værling) Emberiza leucocephalos A*
- Rock bunting (klippeværling) Emberiza cia A*
- Cinereous bunting (gulgrå værling) Emberiza cineracea A*
- Ortolan bunting (hortulan) Emberiza hortulana A
- Cirl bunting (gærdeværling) Emberiza cirlus A*
- Little bunting (dværgværling) Emberiza pusilla A*
- Yellow-browed bunting (gulbrynet værling) Emberiza chrysophrys A*
- Rustic bunting (pileværling) Emberiza rustica A*
- Yellow-breasted bunting (gulbrystet værling) Emberiza aureola A*
- Black-headed bunting (hætteværling) Emberiza melanocephala A*
- Red-headed bunting (brunhovedet værling) Emberiza bruniceps A*
- Reed bunting (rørspurv) Emberiza schoeniclus A

== New World sparrows ==
Order: Passeriformes Family: Passerellidae

Until 2017, these species were considered part of the family Emberizidae. Most of the species are known as sparrows, but these birds are not closely related to the Old World sparrows which are in the family Passeridae. Many of these have distinctive head patterns.

- White-throated sparrow (hvidstrubet spurv) Zonotrichia albicollis A*
- Dark-eyed junco (mørkøjet junco) Junco hyemalis A*

== New World warblers ==
Order: Passeriformes Family: Parulidae

Parulidae are a group of small, often colourful birds restricted to the New World. Most are arboreal and insectivorous.

- American yellow warbler (gul sanger) Setophaga aestiva A*
- Blackpoll warbler (stribet sanger) Setophaga striata A*

== Cardinals and allies ==
Order: Passeriformes Family: Cardinalidae

The cardinals are a family of robust seed-eating birds with strong bills. They are typically associated with open woodland. The sexes usually have distinct plumages.

- Rose-breasted grosbeak (rosenbrystet kernebider) Pheucticus ludovicianus A*

== See also ==
- List of birds of the Faroe Islands
- List of birds of Greenland
- List of birds
- Lists of birds by region
