= List of birds of the Faroe Islands =

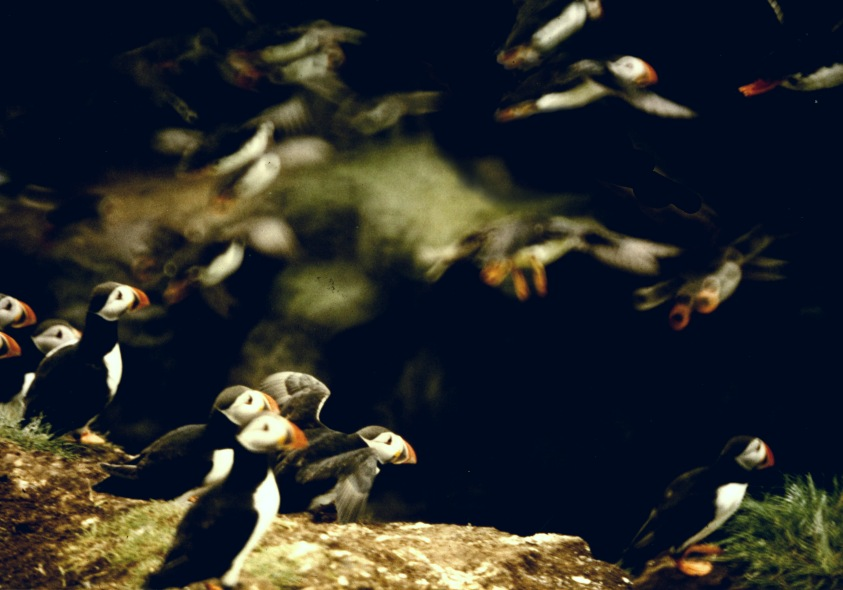
Atlantic puffins in Mykines

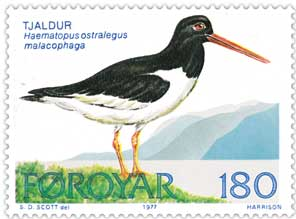
The tjaldur (Eurasian oystercatcher) is the national bird and can be found all over the country

This is a list of bird species confirmed in the Faroe Islands; a total of 358 species have been recorded. There are about 40 common breeding birds, including the seabirds northern fulmar (600,000 pairs), Atlantic puffin (550,000 pairs), European storm petrel (250,000 pairs), black-legged kittiwake (230,000 pairs), common guillemot (175,000 pairs), Manx shearwater (25,000 pairs).

This list's taxonomic treatment (designation and sequence of orders, families and species) and nomenclature (English and scientific names) are those of the Danish Faroese official bird list, 2022 edition, which follows the IOC World Bird List. The family accounts at the beginning of each heading reflect this taxonomy, as do the species counts found in each family account. Accidental species are included in the total species count for the Faroe Islands.

Bird species admitted to the Faroese List are included in the following categories A, B or C, with the same definitions as the British and other Western Palaearctic bird lists:

- A: species that have been recorded in an apparently natural state at least once since 1 January 1950.
- B: species that were recorded in an apparently natural state at least once between 1 January 1800 and 31 December 1949, but have not been recorded subsequently.
- C: species introduced by humans, and have established breeding populations derived from introduced stock, which maintain themselves without necessary recourse to further introduction.
- Species marked with a * are rare species which require acceptance by the Sjældenheds Udvalget (SU; the Danish Rarities Committee).

Symbolically, the most important of the birds of the Faroe Islands is the Eurasian oystercatcher (Haematopus ostralegus). Their annual arrival on about 12 March is celebrated by the Faroe Islanders as the start of spring. For this reason, the tjaldur (pronounced [ˈtʃaldʊɹ]), is recognised as the national bird of the Faroes. However, in numbers, the avifauna is dominated by an estimated two million pairs of breeding seabirds of several species. There are also some resident landbirds and many regular visitors, both passage migrants and breeders, as well as several species recorded occasionally as vagrants, mainly from Europe. The Faroese postal system, the Postverk Føroya, prints stamps portraying Faroe birds. See external links.

== History ==
The great auk formerly bred on the Faroes, but became extinct throughout its range in the North Atlantic in the early 19th century due to human predation; the last Faroese record was on Stóra Dímun on 1 July 1808. The pied raven, a colour morph of the common raven, also occurred, but the last confirmed record was in 1902. Normal all-black common ravens remain widespread in the archipelago.

Historically, harvesting seabirds for food was an important source of nutrition for the islanders. A reduced and strictly regulated harvest, mainly of fulmars and puffins, continues. In general, the seabirds and their nesting areas are now strongly protected.

== Pheasants, grouse, and allies ==
Order: Galliformes Family: Phasianidae

These are terrestrial species of gamebirds, feeding and nesting on the ground. They are variable in size but generally plump, with broad and relatively short wings.

- Common quail (vaktil) Coturnix coturnix A*

== Ducks, geese, and waterfowl ==
Order: Anseriformes Family: Anatidae

Anatidae includes the geese, swans and ducks. These birds are adapted to an aquatic existence with webbed feet, flattened bills, and feathers that are excellent at shedding water due to an oily coating.

- Brant goose (helsigás) Branta bernicla A
- Canada goose (øshvít gás) Branta canadensis C
- Barnacle goose (brandgás) Branta leucopsis A/C
- Bar-headed goose (indisk gás) Anser indicus C*
- Snow goose (snjógás) Anser caerulescens A*
- Greylag goose (grágás) Anser anser A
- Taiga bean goose (ekrugás) Anser fabalis A*
- Pink-footed goose (íslandsgás) Anser brachyrhynchus A
- Tundra bean goose (frostmýrigás) Anser serrirostris A*
- Greater white-fronted goose (korngás) Anser albifrons A
- Black swan (svartsvanur) Cygnus atratus C*
- Mute swan (knópsvanur) Cygnus olor A*
- Tundra swan (dvørgsvanur) Cygnus columbianus A*
- Whooper swan (vanligur svanur) Cygnus cygnus A
- Common shelduck (kápureyð ont) Tadorna tadorna A
- Mandarin duck (seglont) Aix galericulata C
- Garganey (teymont) Spatula querquedula A
- Blue-winged teal (vongblá ont) Spatula discors A*
- Northern shoveler (spónont) Spatula clypeata A
- Gadwall (sutlont) Mareca strepera A
- Eurasian wigeon (ennigul ont) Mareca penelope A
- American wigeon (ennihvít ont) Mareca americana A*
- Mallard (villdunna) Anas platyrhynchos A
- American black duck (dimmmorreyð ont) Anas rubripes A*
- Northern pintail (snælduont) Anas acuta A
- Eurasian teal (krikkont) Anas crecca A
- Green-winged teal (rípuont) Anas carolinensis A*
- Common pochard (høvuðreyð ont) Aythya ferina A
- Ferruginous duck (hvítoygd ont) Aythya nyroca A*
- Ring-necked duck (helsiont) Aythya collaris A
- Tufted duck (trøllont) Aythya fuligula A
- Greater scaup (stór grábøka) Aythya marila A
- Lesser scaup (lítil grábøka) Aythya affinis A*
- Steller's eider (høvuðhvít æða) Polysticta stelleri A*
- King eider (æðukongur) Somateria spectabilis A
- Common eider (æða) Somateria mollissima A
- Harlequin duck (brimont) Histrionicus histrionicus A*
- Surf scoter (nakkahvít ont) Melanitta perspicillata A*
- Velvet scoter (spegilsont) Melanitta fusca A
- White-winged scoter (skyggisont) Melanitta deglandi A*
- Common scoter (kolont) Melanitta nigra A
- Long-tailed duck (ógvella) Clangula hyemalis A
- Common goldeneye (vanlig súgont) Bucephala clangula A
- Barrow's goldeneye (íslendsk súgont) Bucephala islandica A*
- Smew (maront) Mergellus albellus A*
- Hooded merganser (sagont) Lophodytes cucullatus A*
- Goosander (tannont) Mergus merganser A
- Red-breasted merganser (toppont) Mergus serrator A
- Ruddy duck (tonut skarvsont) Oxyura jamaicensis C*

== Nightjars and allies ==
Order: Caprimulgiformes Family: Caprimulgidae

Nightjars are medium-sized nocturnal birds that usually nest on the ground. They have long wings, short legs, and very short bills. Most have small feet, of little use for walking, and long pointed wings. Their soft plumage is camouflaged to resemble bark or leaves.

- Common nighthawk (amerikanskur náttsmyril) Chordeiles minor A*
- Eurasian nightjar (vanlig náttkjarra) Caprimulgus europaeus B*

== Swifts ==
Order: Caprimulgiformes Family: Apodidae

Swifts are small birds which spend the majority of their lives flying. These birds have very short legs and never settle voluntarily on the ground, perching instead only on vertical surfaces. Swifts have long swept-back wings which resemble a crescent.

- White-throated needletail (loftsveimari) Hirundapus caudacutus A*
- Common swift (feigdarsveimari) Apus apus A

== Cuckoos ==
Order: Cuculiformes Family: Cuculidae

The family Cuculidae includes cuckoos, roadrunners, and anis. These birds are of variable size with slender bodies, long tails, and strong legs. The Old World cuckoos are brood parasites.

- Common cuckoo (vanligur geykur) Cuculus canorus A

== Sandgrouse ==
Order: Pterocliformes Family: Pteroclidae

Sandgrouse have small pigeon-like heads and necks, but sturdy compact bodies. They have long pointed wings and sometimes tails and a fast direct flight. Flocks fly to watering holes at dawn and dusk. Their legs are feathered down to the toes.

- Pallas's sandgrouse (fornahøna) Syrrhaptes paradoxus B*

== Pigeons and doves ==
Order: Columbiformes Family: Columbidae

Pigeons and doves are stout-bodied birds with short necks and short slender bills with a fleshy cere.

- Rock dove (bládúgva) Columba livia A/C
- Stock dove (holudúgva) Columba oenas A*
- Common wood pigeon (mánadúgva) Columba palumbus A
- European turtle dove (turtildúgva) Streptopelia turtur A
- Oriental turtle dove (eystanturtildúgva) Streptopelia orientalis A*
- Eurasian collared dove (turkadúgva) Streptopelia decaocto A
- Mourning dove (harmadúgva) Zenaida macroura A*

== Rails, moorhens, and coots ==
Order: Gruiformes Family: Rallidae

Rallidae is a large family of small to medium-sized birds which includes the rails, crakes, moorhens, and coots. Typically they inhabit dense vegetation in damp environments near lakes, swamps, or rivers. Many are shy and secretive birds, making them difficult to observe. Most species have strong legs and long toes which are well adapted to soft uneven surfaces. They tend to have short, rounded wings and to be weak fliers, though are capable of long-distance migration.

- Water rail (jarðakona) Rallus aquaticus A
- Corn crake (akurskritt) Crex crex A*
- Spotted crake (døggsmetta) Porzana porzana A*
- Common moorhen (sevhøna) Gallinula chloropus A
- Eurasian coot (vanlig sjógvhøna) Fulica atra A
- American coot (amerikonsk sjógvhøna) Fulica americana A*

== Cranes ==
Order: Gruiformes Family: Gruidae

Cranes are large, long-legged, and long-necked birds. Unlike the similar-looking but unrelated herons, cranes fly with necks outstretched, not pulled back. Most have elaborate and noisy courting displays.

- Sandhill crane (kanadatrani) Antigone canadensis A*
- Common crane (grátrani) Grus grus A

== Grebes ==
Order: Podicipediformes Family: Podicipedidae

Grebes are small to medium-large freshwater diving birds. They have lobed toes and are excellent swimmers and divers. However, they have their feet placed far back on the body, making them quite ungainly on land.

- Little grebe (smágjør) Tachybaptus ruficollis A*
- Pied-billed grebe (stúvgjør) Podilymbus podiceps A*
- Red-necked grebe (øsgrá gjør) Podiceps grisegena A*
- Great crested grebe (kambsgjør) Podiceps cristatus A*
- Slavonian grebe (norðurgjør) Podiceps auritus A

== Stone-curlews ==
Order: Charadriiformes Family: Burhinidae

The stone-curlews are a group of waders found worldwide within the tropical zone, with some species also breeding in temperate Europe and Asia. They are medium to large waders with strong black or yellow-black bills, large yellow eyes, and cryptic plumage. Despite being classed as waders, most species have a preference for arid or semi-arid habitats.

- Eurasian stone-curlew (læmingur) Burhinus oedicnemus A*

== Oystercatchers ==
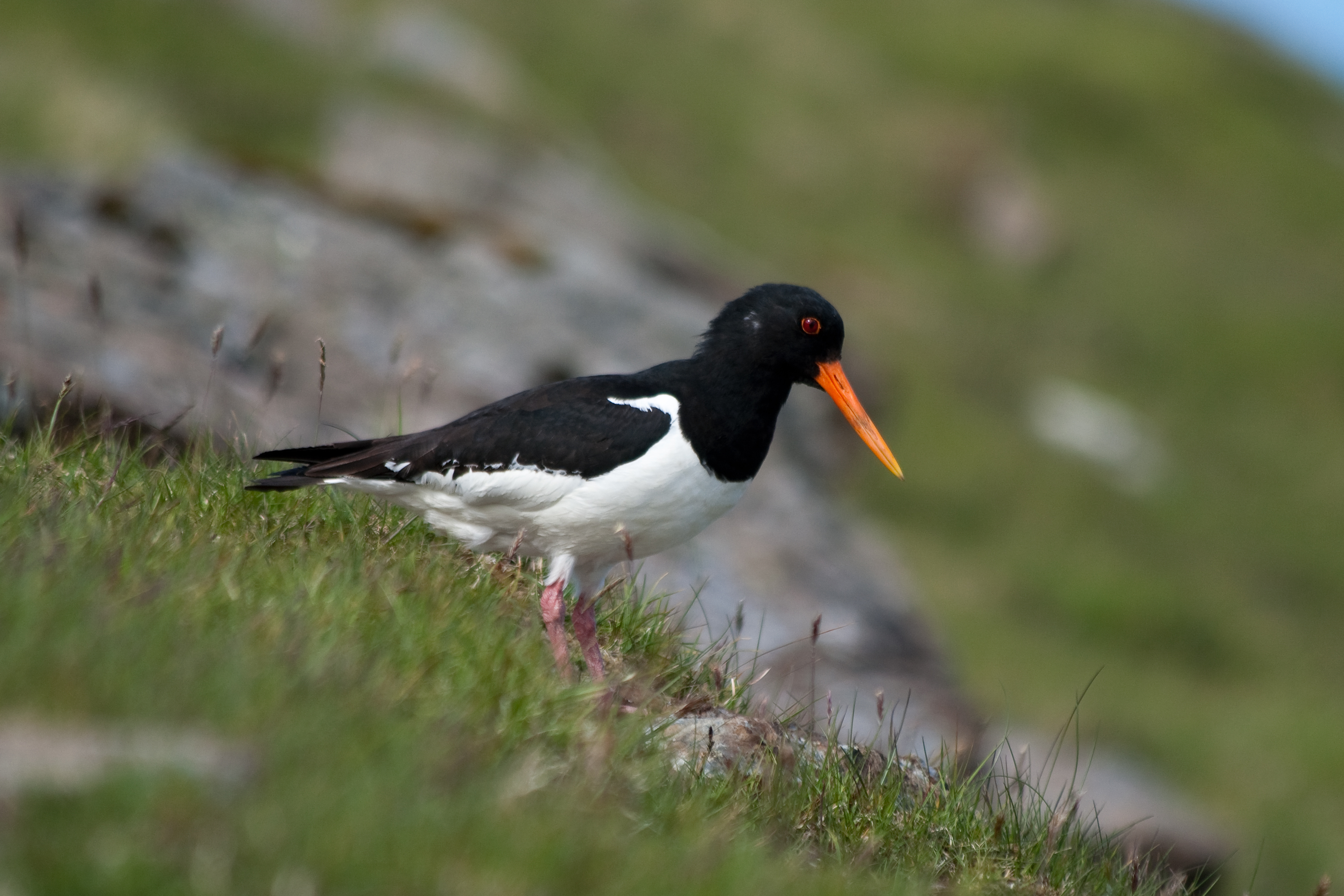
A Eurasian oystercatcher at Gjógv on Eysturoy, in the Faroe Islands

Order: Charadriiformes Family: Haematopodidae

The oystercatchers are large and noisy plover-like birds, with strong bills used for smashing or prising open molluscs.

- Eurasian oystercatcher (tjaldur) Haematopus ostralegus A

== Stilts and avocets ==
Order: Charadriiformes Family: Recurvirostridae

Recurvirostridae is a family of large wading birds which includes the avocets and stilts. The avocets have long legs and long up-curved bills. The stilts have extremely long legs and long, thin, straight bills.

- Pied avocet (nevfatti) Recurvirostra avosetta A*

== Plovers and lapwings ==
Order: Charadriiformes Family: Charadriidae

The family Charadriidae includes the plovers, dotterels, and lapwings. They are small to medium-sized birds with compact bodies, short thick necks, and long, usually pointed, wings. They are found in open country worldwide, mostly in habitats near water.

- Northern lapwing (vípa) Vanellus vanellus A
- European golden plover (hagalógv) Pluvialis apricaria A
- Grey plover (fjørulógv) Pluvialis squatarola A
- Common ringed plover (stór svarthálsa) Charadrius hiaticula A
- Little ringed plover (lítil svarthálsa) Charadrius dubius A*
- Killdeer (tvíringd svarthálsa) Charadrius vociferus B*
- Eurasian dotterel (kviðreyð lógv) Charadrius morinellus B*

== Sandpipers and allies ==
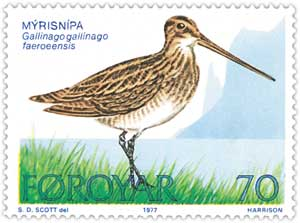
The common snipe, mýrisnípa in Faroese, has a local subspecies Faroese snipe (Gallinago gallinago faeroeensis)

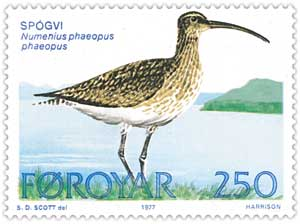
The Eurasian whimbrel (Numenius phaeopus), known as spógvi, which comes in the early summer and leaves in August to migrate to west Africa.

Order: Charadriiformes Family: Scolopacidae

Scolopacidae is a large diverse family of small to medium-sized shorebirds including the sandpipers, curlews, godwits, shanks, woodcocks, snipes, dowitchers, and phalaropes. The majority of these species eat small invertebrates picked out of the mud or soil. Variation in length of legs and bills enables multiple species to feed in the same habitat, particularly on the coast, without direct competition for food.

- Eurasian whimbrel (spógvi) Numenius phaeopus A
- Eurasian curlew (tangspógvi) Numenius arquata A
- Bar-tailed godwit (lónspógvi) Limosa lapponica A
- Black-tailed godwit (reyðspógvi) Limosa limosa A
- Ruddy turnstone (tjaldursgrælingur) Arenaria interpres A
- Red knot (íslandsgrælingur) Calidris canutus A
- Ruff (kápugrælingur) Calidris pugnax A
- Broad-billed sandpiper Calidris falcinellus A*
- Curlew sandpiper (reyðgrælingur) Calidris ferruginea A*
- Sanderling (sandgrælingur) Calidris alba A
- Dunlin (fjallmurra) Calidris alpina A
- Purple sandpiper (grágrælingur) Calidris maritima A
- Baird's sandpiper (slankugrælingur) Calidris bairdii A*
- Little stint (dvørggrælingur) Calidris minuta A*
- White-rumped sandpiper (nevstuttur grælingur) Calidris fuscicollis A*
- Buff-breasted sandpiper (roðagrælingur) Calidris subruficollis A*
- Pectoral sandpiper (sjógrælingur) Calidris melanotos A*
- Semipalmated sandpiper (fitjugrælingur) Calidris pusilla A*
- Long-billed dowitcher (nevlangur snípustelkur) Limnodromus scolopaceus A*
- Eurasian woodcock (skógsnípa) Scolopax rusticola A
- Jack snipe (smásnípa) Lymnocryptes minimus A
- Common snipe (mýrisnípa) Gallinago gallinago A
- Red-necked phalarope (vanligur helsareyði) Phalaropus lobatus A
- Grey phalarope (morlittur helsareyði) Phalaropus fulicarius A*
- Common sandpiper (fjørustelkur) Actitis hypoleucos A
- Green sandpiper (flykrustelkur) Tringa ochropus A*
- Common redshank (vanligur stelkur) Tringa totanus A
- Wood sandpiper (vaðstelkur) Tringa glareola A*
- Spotted redshank (svartstelkur) Tringa erythropus A*
- Common greenshank (hvítstelkur) Tringa nebularia A
- Greater yellowlegs (stórur gulstelkur) Tringa melanoleuca A*

== Gulls, terns, and skimmers ==
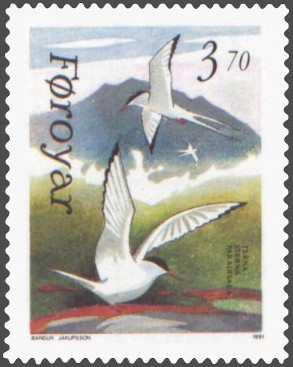
The Arctic tern (Sterna paradisaea), is known as terna in Faroese. Note to pronounce it [ˈtɛdna], because a [ˈtɛrna] is a stewardess.

Order: Charadriiformes Family: Laridae

Laridae is a family of medium to large seabirds and includes gulls, terns, and skimmers. Gulls are typically gray or white, often with black markings on the head or wings. They have stout, longish, bills and webbed feet. Terns are a group of generally medium to large seabirds typically with gray or white plumage, often with black markings on the head. Most terns hunt fish by diving but some pick insects off the surface of fresh water. Terns are generally long-lived birds, with several species known to live in excess of 30 years.

- Black-legged kittiwake (ryta) Rissa tridactyla A
- Ivory gull (ísmási) Pagophila eburnea A*
- Sabine's gull (ternumási) Xema sabini A*
- Bonaparte's gull (hattarmási) Chroicocephalus philadelphia A*
- Black-headed gull (fransaterna) Chroicocephalus ridibundus A
- Little gull (dvørgmási) Hydrocoloeus minutus A
- Ross's gull (brandmási) Rhodostethia rosea A*
- Franklin's gull (heygsmási) Leucophaeus pipixcan A*
- Mediterranean gull (høvuðsvartur mási) Ichthyaetus melanocephalus A*
- Common gull (skatumási) Larus canus A
- Ring-billed gull (sæmási) Larus delawarensis A*
- Great black-backed gull (svartbakur) Larus marinus A
- Glaucous gull (stórur valmási) Larus hyperboreus A
- Iceland gull (lítil valmási) Larus glaucoides A
- European herring gull (fiskimási) Larus argentatus A
- Lesser black-backed gull (likka) Larus fuscus A
- Caspian tern (brituterna) Hydroprogne caspia B*
- Sandwich tern (faksaterna) Thalasseus sandvicensis A*
- Little tern (fruntaterna) Sternula albifrons B*
- Common tern (kriterna) Sterna hirundo A
- Arctic tern (havterna) Sterna paradisaea A
- White-winged tern (vonghvít terna) Chlidonias leucopterus A*
- Black tern (svartterna) Chlidonias niger A*

== Skuas ==
Order: Charadriiformes Family: Stercorariidae

The family Stercorariidae are, in general, medium to large sea birds, typically with brown plumage, often with white markings on the wings. They nest on the ground in subarctic and arctic regions and are long-distance migrants.

- South polar skua (suðurhavsskúgvur) Stercorarius maccormicki B*
- Great skua (vanligur skúgvur) Stercorarius skua A
- Pomarine skua (jói) Stercorarius pomarinus A
- Arctic skua (vanligur kjógvi) Stercorarius parasiticus A
- Long-tailed skua (snældukjógvi) Stercorarius longicaudus A

== Auks, guillemots, and puffins ==
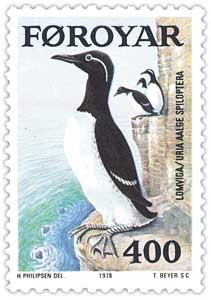
The common guillemot (Uria aalge) is very common and known as lomviga. The Faroese used to eat it.

Order: Charadriiformes Family: Alcidae

Alcidae are a family of seabirds which are superficially similar to penguins with their black-and-white colour, their upright posture, and some of their habits, but which are able to fly.

- Little auk (fulkubbi) Alle alle A
- Brünnich's guillemot (íslandslomvigi) Uria lomvia A
- Common guillemot (lomvigi) Uria aalge A
- Razorbill (álka) Alca torda A
- Great auk (gorfuglur) Pinguinus impennis B (extinct)
- Black guillemot (teisti) Cepphus grylle A
- Atlantic puffin (lundi) Fratercula arctica A
- Tufted puffin (topplundi) Fratercula cirrhata A*

== Divers ==
Order: Gaviiformes Family: Gaviidae

Divers or loons are a group of aquatic birds found in cooler parts of the Northern Hemisphere. They are the size of a cormorant, which they somewhat resemble in shape when swimming, but to which they are completely unrelated. In particular, their legs are set very far back which assists swimming underwater but makes walking on land extremely difficult.

- Red-throated diver (øsreyður lómur) Gavia stellata A
- Black-throated diver (øssvartur lómur) Gavia arctica A*
- Great northern diver (havgás) Gavia immer A
- White-billed diver (nevgulur lómur) Gavia adamsii A*

== Southern storm petrels ==
Order: Procellariiformes Family: Oceanitidae

The southern storm petrels are relatives of the petrels and are the smallest seabirds. They feed on planktonic crustaceans and small fish picked from the surface, typically while hovering.

- Wilson's storm petrel (fitjugulur drunnhvíti) Oceanites oceanicus A*

== Albatrosses ==
Order: Procellariiformes Family: Diomedeidae

The albatrosses are among the largest of flying birds, and the great albatrosses of the genus Diomedea have the largest wingspans of any extant birds.

- Black-browed albatross (dimmbrýntur súlukongur) Thalassarche melanophris A*
- Atlantic yellow-nosed albatross (nevgulur súlukongur) Thalassarche chlororhynchos A*

== Northern storm petrels ==
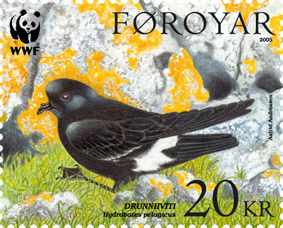
The European storm petrel (Hydrobates pelagicus), or drunnhvíti, can be best observed in Nólsoy in the biggest colony of the species in the world.

Order: Procellariiformes Family: Hydrobatidae

Though the members of this family are similar in many respects to the southern storm-petrels, including their general appearance and habits, there are enough genetic differences to warrant their placement in a separate family.

- European storm petrel (lítil drunnhvíti) Hydrobates pelagicus A
- Leach's storm petrel (sýldur drunnhvíti) Hydrobates leucorrhous A

== Shearwaters and petrels ==
Order: Procellariiformes Family: Procellariidae

The procellariids are the main group of medium-sized "true petrels", characterized by united nostrils with medium septum and a long outer functional primary.

- Northern fulmar (havhestur) Fulmarus glacialis A
- Scopoli's shearwater (miðjarðarhavsurðarskrápur) Calonectris diomedea B*
- Sooty shearwater (gráskrápur) Ardenna griseus A
- Great shearwater (stórskrápur) Ardenna gravis A*
- Manx shearwater (vanligur skrápur) Puffinus puffinus A

== Boobies and gannets ==
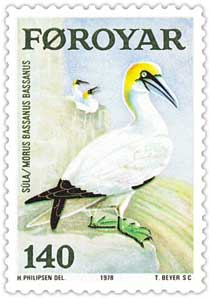
The gannet (Morus bassanus), known as súla, is a common bird in the Faroe Islands.

Order: Suliformes Family: Sulidae

The sulids comprise the gannets and boobies. Both groups are medium-large coastal seabirds that plunge-dive for fish.

- Northern gannet (súla) Morus bassanus A

== Cormorants and shags ==
Order: Suliformes Family: Phalacrocoracidae

Cormorants and shags are medium-to-large aquatic birds, usually with mainly dark plumage and areas of colored skin on the face. The bill is long, thin and sharply hooked. Their feet are four-toed and webbed.

- European shag (skarvur) Gulosus aristotelis A
- Great cormorant (hiplingur) Phalacrocorax carbo A

== Ibises and spoonbills ==
Order: Pelecaniformes Family: Threskiornithidae

The family Threskiornithidae includes the ibises and spoonbills. They have long, broad wings. Their bodies tend to be elongated, the neck more so, with rather long legs. The bill is also long, decurved in the case of the ibises, straight and distinctively flattened in the spoonbills.

- Glossy ibis (bognev) Plegadis falcinellus A*
- Eurasian spoonbill (spónnev) Platalea leucorodia A*

== Herons, egrets, and bitterns ==
Order: Pelecaniformes Family: Ardeidae

The family Ardeidae contains the herons, egrets, and bitterns. Herons and egrets are medium to large wading birds with long necks and legs. Bitterns tend to be shorter necked and more secretive. Members of Ardeidae fly with their necks retracted, unlike other long-necked birds such as storks, ibises and spoonbills.

- Great bittern (mækjuglámur) Botaurus stellaris A*
- American bittern (sevglámur) Botaurus lentiginosus A*
- Little bittern (smáglámur) Ixobrychus minutus A*
- Black-crowned night heron (nátthegri) Nycticorax nycticorax A*
- Cattle egret (kúhegri) Bubulcus ibis A*
- Grey heron (gráhegri) Ardea cinerea A
- Purple heron (korkahegri) Ardea purpurea A*
- Great egret (silvurhegri) Ardea alba A*
- Little egret (silkihegri) Egretta garzetta A

== Osprey ==
Order: Accipitriformes Family: Pandionidae

Pandionidae is a family of fish-eating birds of prey, possessing a very large, powerful hooked beak for tearing flesh from their prey, strong legs, powerful talons, and keen eyesight. The family is monotypic.

- Osprey (fiskiørn) Pandion haliaetus A

== Hawks, eagles and kites ==
Order: Accipitriformes Family: Accipitridae

Accipitridae is a family of birds of prey and includes hawks, eagles, kites, harriers, and Old World vultures. These birds have very large powerful hooked beaks for tearing flesh from their prey, strong legs, powerful talons, and keen eyesight.

- European honey-buzzard (bývákur) Pernis apivorus A*
- Eurasian sparrowhawk (spurvaheykur) Accipiter nisus A
- Northern goshawk (høsnaheykur) Accipiter gentilis A*
- Eurasian marsh harrier (blotaheykur) Circus aeruginosus A*
- Hen harrier (fenheykur) Circus cyaneus A*
- Northern harrier (mýriheykur) Circus hudsonius A*
- Red kite (reyðgleða) Milvus milvus A*
- Black kite (svartgleða) Milvus migrans A*
- White-tailed eagle (havørn) Haliaeetus albicilla A*
- Rough-legged buzzard (fjallvákur) Buteo lagopus A*
- Common buzzard (músvákur) Buteo buteo A*

== Owls ==
Order: Strigiformes Family: Strigidae

Typical owls are small to large solitary nocturnal birds of prey. They have large forward-facing eyes and ears, a hawk-like beak, and a conspicuous circle of feathers around each eye called a facial disk.

- Eurasian scops owl (glámúgla) Otus scops A*
- Snowy owl (snjóugla) Bubo scandiacus A*
- Long-eared owl (kattúgla) Asio otus A
- Short-eared owl (hagaugla) Asio flammeus A

== Hoopoes ==
Order: Bucerotiformes Family: Upupidae

Hoopoes have black, white and orangey-pink plumage with a large erectile crest on their head.

- Eurasian hoopoe (herfuglur) Upupa epops A

== Rollers ==
Order: Coraciiformes Family: Coraciidae

Rollers resemble crows in size and build, but are more closely related to the kingfishers and bee-eaters. They share the colourful appearance of those groups with blues and browns predominating. The two inner front toes are connected, but the outer toe is not.

- European roller (bláfjatla) Coracias garrulus A*

== Bee-eaters ==
Order: Coraciiformes Family: Meropidae

The bee-eaters are a group of coraciiform birds in the family Meropidae. Most species are found in Africa but others occur in southern Europe, Madagascar, Australia and New Guinea. They have richly coloured plumage, slender bodies and usually elongated central tail feathers, long downturned bills and pointed wings, which give them a swallow-like appearance when seen from afar.

- Blue-cheeked bee-eater (grønur býflugubítur) Merops persicus A*
- European bee-eater (býflugubítur) Merops apiaster A*

== Woodpeckers ==
Order: Piciformes Family: Picidae

Woodpeckers are small to medium-sized birds with chisel-like beaks, short legs, stiff tails and long tongues used for capturing insects. Some species have feet with two toes pointing forward and two backward, while several species have only three toes. Many woodpeckers have the habit of tapping noisily on tree trunks with their beaks.

- Eurasian wryneck (snúðurkriki) Jynx torquilla A
- Great spotted woodpecker (stór flekkuspæta) Dendrocopos major A*

== Falcons ==
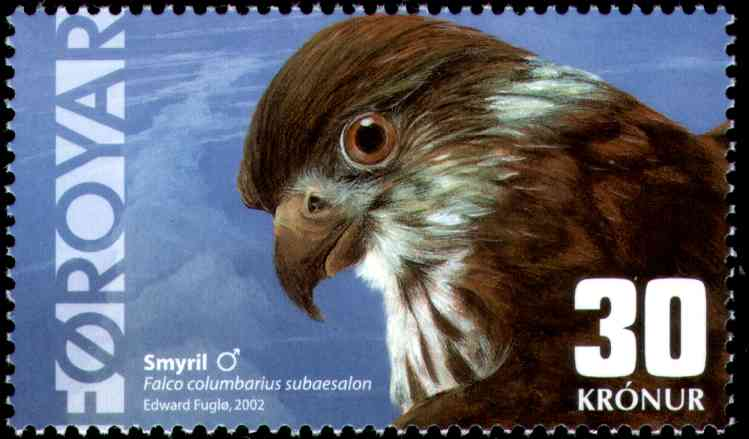
The merlin (Falco columbarius subaesalon), known as vanligur smyril

Order: Falconiformes Family: Falconidae

Falconidae is a family of diurnal birds of prey. They differ from hawks, eagles and kites in that they kill with their beaks instead of their talons.

- Lesser kestrel (reyðsmyril) Falco naumanni A*
- Eurasian kestrel (grýtissmyril) Falco tinnunculus A
- Amur falcon (amursmyril) Falco amurensis A*
- Merlin (vanligur smyril) Falco columbarius A
- Eurasian hobby (vákasmyril) Falco subbuteo A*
- Gyrfalcon (veiðifalkur) Falco rusticolus A*
- Peregrine falcon (ferðafalkur) Falco peregrinus A*

== Shrikes ==
Order: Passeriformes Family: Laniidae

Shrikes are passerine birds known for their habit of catching other birds and small animals and impaling the uneaten portions of their bodies on thorns. A shrike's beak is hooked, like that of a typical bird of prey.

- Red-backed shrike (morbøkutyrningur) Lanius collurio A
- Isabelline shrike (isabellatyrningur) Lanius isabellinus A*
- Lesser grey shrike (grímutyrningur) Lanius minor A*
- Great grey shrike (grátyrningur) Lanius excubitor A*

== Old World orioles ==
Order: Passeriformes Family: Oriolidae

The Old World orioles are colourful passerine birds. They are not related to the New World orioles.

- Eurasian golden oriole (gyllingur) Oriolus oriolus A

== Crows, jays, and magpies ==
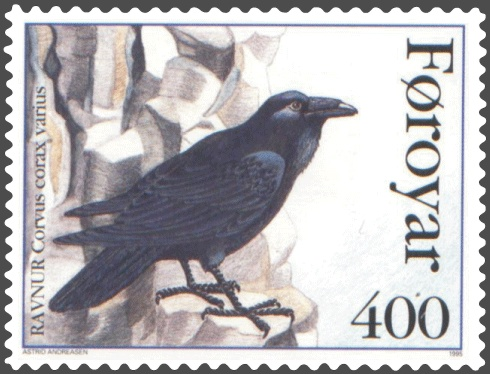
The common raven has a sub-species North Atlantic raven (Corvus corax varius) which is known as ravnur. In Faroese national symbolism, it is the counterpart of the oystercatcher and standing for the Danish monopolization of trade to India.

Order: Passeriformes Family: Corvidae

The family Corvidae includes crows, ravens, jays, choughs, magpies, treepies, nutcrackers, and ground jays. Corvids are above average in size among the Passeriformes, and some of the larger species show high levels of intelligence.

- Eurasian magpie (skjóra) Pica pica A*
- Eurasian jackdaw (rókur) Coloeus monedula A
- Rook (felliskráka) Corvus frugilegus A
- Carrion crow (hjaltakráka) Corvus corone A
- Hooded crow (grákráka) Corvus cornix A
- Common raven (ravnur) Corvus corax A

== Waxwings ==
Order: Passeriformes Family: Bombycillidae

The waxwings are a group of birds with soft silky plumage and unique red tips to some of the wing feathers; these tips look like sealing wax and give the group its name. These are arboreal birds of northern forests. They live on insects in summer and berries in winter.

- Bohemian waxwing (reyðstapi) Bombycilla garrulus A

== Tits ==
Order: Passeriformes Family: Paridae

The Paridae are mainly small stocky woodland species with short stout bills. Some have crests. They are adaptable birds, with a mixed diet including seeds and insects.

- Eurasian blue tit (blátíta) Cyanistes caeruleus A*
- Great tit (stórtíta) Parus major A*

== Larks ==
Order: Passeriformes Family: Alaudidae

Larks are small terrestrial birds with often extravagant songs and display flights. Most larks are fairly dull in appearance. Their food is insects and seeds.

- Wood lark (trælerkur) Lullula arborea A*
- Eurasian skylark (ljómlerkur) Alauda arvensis A
- Horned lark (knavalerkur) Eremophila alpestris A*

== Swallows and martins ==
Order: Passeriformes Family: Hirundinidae

The family Hirundinidae is adapted to aerial feeding. They have a slender streamlined body, long pointed wings, and a short bill with a wide gape. The feet are adapted to perching rather than walking, and the front toes are partially joined at the base.

- Sand martin (áarsvala) Riparia riparia A
- Barn swallow (løðusvala) Hirundo rustica A
- Common house martin (lonasvala) Delichon urbicum A
- Red-rumped swallow (brandsvala) Cecropis rufula A*

== Leaf warblers ==
Order: Passeriformes Family: Phylloscopidae

Leaf warblers are a family of small insectivorous birds found mostly in Eurasia and ranging into Wallacea and Africa. The species are of various sizes, often green-plumaged above and yellow below, or more subdued with greyish-green to greyish-brown colours.

- Wood warbler (skógljómari) Phylloscopus sibilatrix A
- Western Bonelli's warbler (fjallaljómari) Phylloscopus bonelli A*
- Eastern Bonelli's warbler (ærgisljómari) Phylloscopus orientalis A*
- Hume's warbler (bjargaljómari) Phylloscopus humei A*
- Yellow-browed warbler (nilksljómari) Phylloscopus inornatus A
- Pallas's leaf warbler (kongsljómari) Phylloscopus proregulus A*
- Radde's warbler (birkiljómari) Phylloscopus schwarzi A*
- Dusky warbler (morljómari) Phylloscopus fuscatus A*
- Willow warbler (leyvljómari) Phylloscopus trochilus A
- Common chiffchaff (grannljómari) Phylloscopus collybita A
- Green warbler (kaukasusljómari) Phylloscopus nitidus A*
- Greenish warbler (lundljómari) Phylloscopus trochiloides A*
- Arctic warbler (norðljómari) Phylloscopus borealis A*

== Reed warblers and allies ==
Order: Passeriformes Family: Acrocephalidae

Most are rather plain olivaceous brown above and beige below. They are usually found in open woodland, reedbeds, or tall grass. The family occurs mostly in southern to western Eurasia and surroundings, but it also ranges far into the Pacific, with some species in Africa.

- Great reed warbler (trastljómari) Acrocephalus arundinaceus A*
- Sedge warbler (sevljómari) Acrocephalus schoenobaenus A
- Paddyfield warbler (siljuljómari) Acrocephalus agricola A*
- Blyth's reed warbler (kjarrljómari) Acrocephalus dumetorum A*
- Eurasian reed warbler (royljómari) Acrocephalus scirpaceus A
- Marsh warbler (fenljómari) Acrocephalus palustris A*
- Melodious warbler (hermiljómari) Hippolais polyglotta A*
- Icterine warbler (gulljómari) Hippolais icterina A*

== Grassbirds and allies ==
Order: Passeriformes Family: Locustellidae

Locustellidae are a family of small insectivorous songbirds found mainly in Eurasia, Africa, and the Australian region. They are smallish birds with tails that are usually long and pointed, and tend to be drab brownish or buffy all over.

- Pallas's grasshopper warbler (størljómari) Helopsaltes certhiola A*
- Lanceolated warbler (álaljómari) Locustella lanceolata A*
- Common grasshopper warbler (urniljómari) Locustella naevia A*

== Sylviid warblers and allies ==
Order: Passeriformes Family: Sylviidae

The family Sylviidae is a group of small insectivorous birds. They mainly occur as breeding species, as another common name (Old World warblers) implies, in Europe, Asia and, to a lesser extent, Africa. Most are of generally undistinguished appearance, but many have distinctive songs.

- Eurasian blackcap (munkur) Sylvia atricapilla A
- Garden warbler (garðljómari) Sylvia borin A
- Barred warbler (heykljómari) Curruca nisoria A
- Lesser whitethroat (notuljómari) Curruca curruca A
- Greater whitethroat (tyrniljómari) Curruca communis A
- Western subalpine warbler (iberiskur ljómari) Curruca iberiae A*
- Eastern subalpine warbler (øsreyður ljómari) Curruca cantillans A*
- Rüppell's warbler (teymljómari) Curruca ruppeli A*

== Crests ==
Order: Passeriformes Family: Regulidae

The crests and kinglets are a small family of birds which resemble some warblers. They are very small insectivorous birds in the single genus Regulus. The adults have a coloured crown stripe, giving rise to their name.

- Common firecrest (eldkrýndur títlingskongur) Regulus ignicapilla A*
- Goldcrest (gulkrýndur títlingskongur) Regulus regulus A

== Wrens ==
Order: Passeriformes Family: Troglodytidae

The wrens are mainly small and inconspicuous except for their loud songs. These birds have short wings and thin down-turned bills. Several species often hold their tails upright. All are insectivorous.

- Eurasian wren (músabróðir) Troglodytes troglodytes A

== Treecreepers ==
Order: Passeriformes Family: Certhiidae

Treecreepers are small woodland birds, brown above and white below. They have thin pointed down-curved bills, which they use to extricate insects from bark. They have stiff tail feathers, like woodpeckers, which they use to support themselves on vertical trees.

- Eurasian treecreeper (trætølpur) Certhia familiaris A*

== Starlings ==
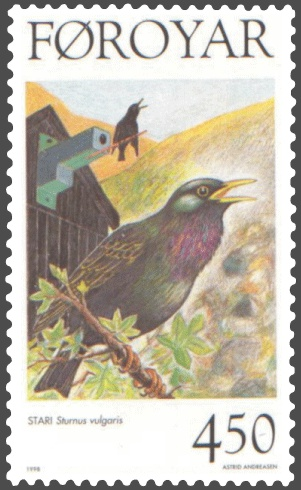
The starling has a Faroese subspecies (Sturnus vulgaris faeroensis), which is marginally larger than other common starlings in Europe. The people's friend is called stari in Faroese.

Order: Passeriformes Family: Sturnidae

Starlings are small to medium-sized passerine birds. Their flight is strong and direct and they are very gregarious. Their preferred habitat is fairly open country. They eat insects and fruit. Their plumage is typically dark with a metallic sheen.

- Rosy starling (brandstari) Pastor roseus A
- Common starling (stari) Sturnus vulgaris A

== Thrushes and allies ==
Order: Passeriformes Family: Turdidae

The thrushes are a family of birds with a cosmopolitan distribution. They are plump, soft-plumaged, small-to-medium-sized insectivores or sometimes omnivores, often feeding on the ground. Many have attractive songs.

- White's thrush (aldutrøstur) Zoothera aurea A*
- Ring ouzel (sigdartrøstur) Turdus torquatus A
- Eurasian blackbird (kvørkveggja) Turdus merula A
- Dusky thrush (mortrøstur) Turdus eunomus A*
- Fieldfare (fjalltrøstur) Turdus pilaris A
- Redwing (óðinshani) Turdus iliacus A
- Song thrush (ljómtrøstur) Turdus philomelos A
- Mistle thrush (diglutrøstur) Turdus viscivorus A*

== Old World flycatchers ==
Order: Passeriformes Family: Muscicapidae

Old World flycatchers are a large group of birds which are mainly small arboreal insectivores. The appearance of these birds is highly varied; most have distinctive songs.

- Spotted flycatcher (gránápur) Muscicapa striata A
- European robin (bringureyði) Erithacus rubecula A
- Bluethroat (blákriki) Luscinia svecica A
- Common nightingale (suðurnáttargali) Luscinia megarhynchos A*
- Red-flanked bluetail (velblái) Tarsiger cyanurus A*
- European pied flycatcher (flekkunápur) Ficedula hypoleuca A
- Collared flycatcher (kraganápur) Ficedula albicollis A*
- Red-breasted flycatcher (smánápur) Ficedula parva A*
- Black redstart (dimmur velreyði) Phoenicurus ochruros A*
- Common redstart (vanligur velreyði) Phoenicurus phoenicurus A
- Whinchat (reyðstólpa) Saxicola rubetra A
- European stonechat (svartstólpa) Saxicola rubicola A
- Siberian stonechat (sibiriastólpa) Saxicola maurus A*
- Northern wheatear (vanlig steinstólpa) Oenanthe oenanthe A

== Dippers ==
Order: Passeriformes Family: Cinclidae

Dippers are a group of perching birds whose habitat includes aquatic environments in the Americas, Europe, and Asia. They are named for their bobbing or dipping movements.

- White-throated dipper (áarkallur) Cinclus cinclus B*

== Old World sparrows ==
Order: Passeriformes Family: Passeridae

In general, Old World sparrows tend to be small, plump, brown birds with short tails and short powerful beaks. Sparrows are seed eaters, but they also consume small insects.

- House sparrow (gráspurvur) Passer domesticus A
- Eurasian tree sparrow (skógspurvur) Passer montanus A

== Accentors ==
Order: Passeriformes Family: Prunellidae

The accentors are the only bird family which is endemic to the Palearctic. They are small, fairly drab species superficially similar to sparrows.

- Dunnock (jarntítlingur) Prunella modularis A

== Wagtails and pipits ==
Order: Passeriformes Family: Motacillidae

Motacillidae is a family of small birds with medium to long tails which includes the wagtails, longclaws, and pipits. They are slender ground-feeding insectivores of open country.

- Western yellow wagtail (gulerla) Motacilla flava A
- Citrine wagtail (mýrierla) Motacilla citreola A*
- Grey wagtail (áarerla) Motacilla cinerea A
- White wagtail (erla kongsdóttir) Motacilla alba A
- Richard's pipit (stórtítlingur) Anthus richardi A*
- Meadow pipit (summartitlingur) Anthus pratensis A
- Tree pipit (viðartítlingur) Anthus trivialis A
- Olive-backed pipit (indiatítlingur) Anthus hodgsoni A*
- Pechora pipit (frostmýritítlingur) Anthus gustavi A*
- Red-throated pipit (reyðtítlingur) Anthus cervinus A*
- European rock pipit (grátitlingur) Anthus petrosus A
- American pipit (vesturtítlingur) Anthus rubescens A*

== Finches, euphonias, and allies ==
Order: Passeriformes Family: Fringillidae

Finches are seed-eating birds that are small to moderately large and have a strong beak, usually conical and in some species very large. All have twelve tail feathers and nine primaries. These birds have a bouncing flight with alternating bouts of flapping and gliding on closed wings, and most sing well.

- Common chaffinch (bókígða) Fringilla coelebs A
- Brambling (fjallígða) Fringilla montifringilla A
- Hawfinch (kjarnbítur) Coccothraustes coccothraustes A
- Eurasian bullfinch (prýðisígða) Pyrrhula pyrrhula A
- Common rosefinch (roðaígða) Carpodacus erythrinus A
- European greenfinch (grønígða) Chloris chloris A
- Twite (lyngígða) Linaria flavirostris A*
- Eurasian linnet (línígða) Linaria cannabina A*
- Redpoll (reyðkollur) Acanthis flammea A
- Parrot crossbill (stórt krossnev) Loxia pytyopsittacus A*
- Red crossbill (vanligt krossnev) Loxia curvirostra A
- Two-barred crossbill (vongblikut krossnev) Loxia leucoptera A*
- European goldfinch (fagurígða) Carduelis carduelis A
- Eurasian siskin (barrígða) Spinus spinus A

== Longspurs and snow buntings ==
Order: Passeriformes Family: Calcariidae

The Calcariidae are a family of birds that had been traditionally grouped with the buntings or the New World sparrows, but differ in a number of respects and are usually found in open grassy areas.

- Lapland bunting (lappspurvur) Calcarius lapponicus A
- Snow bunting (snjóspurvur) Plectrophenax nivalis A

== Buntings ==
Order: Passeriformes Family: Emberizidae

Emberizidae is a family of passerine birds containing a single genus. Until 2017, the New World sparrows (Passerellidae) were also considered part of this family.

- Corn bunting (kornspurvur) Emberiza calandra B*
- Yellowhammer (gulspurvur) Emberiza citrinella A
- Ortolan bunting (riðispurvur) Emberiza hortulana A*
- Little bunting (dvørgspurvur) Emberiza pusilla A*
- Rustic bunting (rustspurvur) Emberiza rustica A*
- Black-headed bunting (knokksvartur spurvur) Emberiza melanocephala A*
- Reed bunting (sevspurvur) Emberiza schoeniclus A

== New World sparrows ==
Order: Passeriformes Family: Passerellidae

Until 2017, these species were considered part of the family Emberizidae. Most of the species are known as sparrows, but they are not closely related to the Old World sparrows which are in the family Passeridae. Many of these have distinctive head patterns.

- White-crowned sparrow (krúnuhvítur spurvur) Zonotrichia leucophrys A*

== New World warblers ==
Order: Passeriformes Family: Parulidae

Parulidae are a group of small, often colourful birds restricted to the New World. Most are arboreal and insectivorous.

- Black-and-white warbler (rípukvøða) Mniotilta varia A*
- Tennessee warbler (ferðakvøða) Leiothlypis peregrina A*

== Places ==
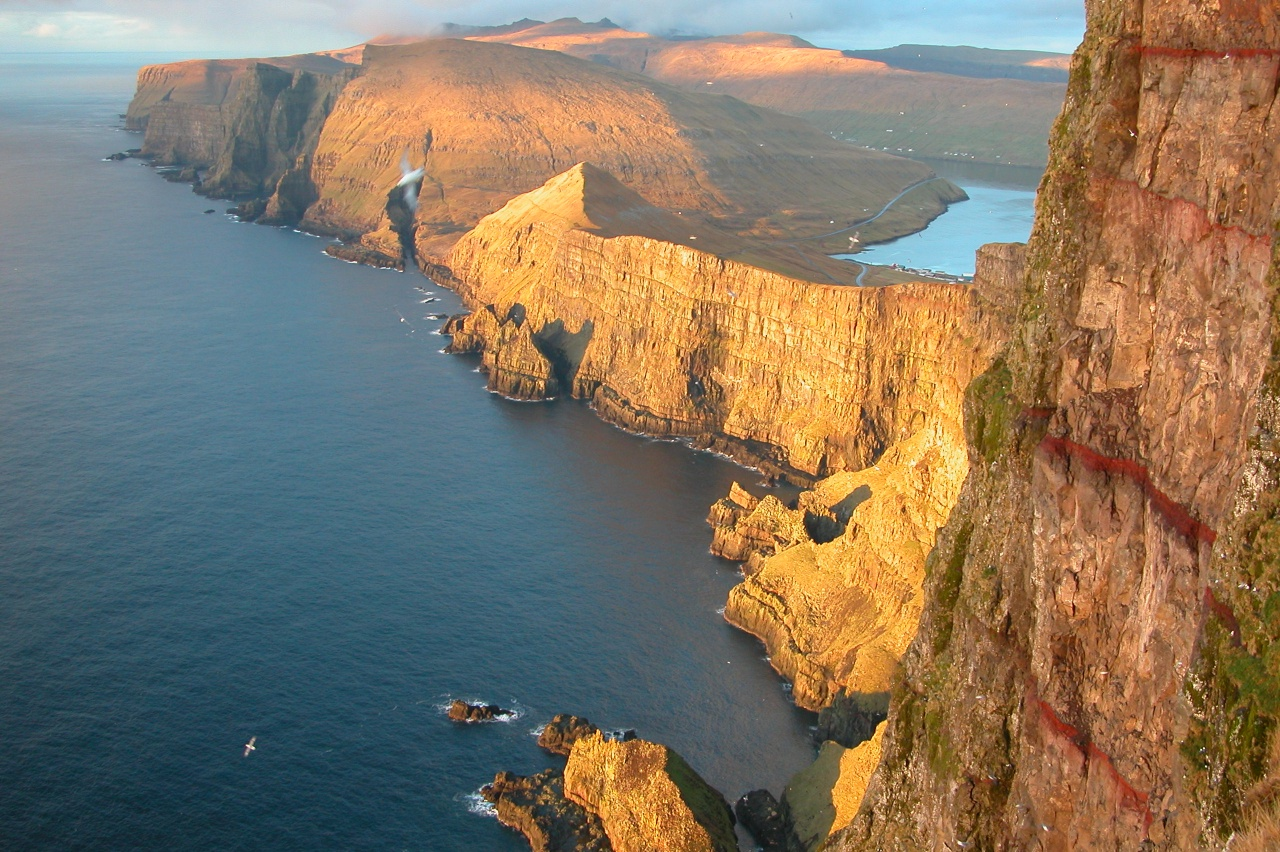
Bird cliffs of Suðuroy

Seabirds can be found in the following places:

- Skuas on Svínoy
- The Vestmanna cliffs
- Gennets on Mykines
- Storm petrels on Nólsoy
- Guillemots and skuas on Skúvoy
- Suðuroy

== See also ==
- List of birds
- Lists of birds by region
- Faroese puffin
