= List of birds of Greenland =

This is a list of the bird species recorded in Greenland. The avifauna of Greenland include a total of 253 species as of February 2025 according to Bird Checklists of the World. Of them, 178 are rare or accidental. One species is extinct (the great auk, another probably is (the Eskimo curlew), and one has been extirpated (the house sparrow).

This list is presented in the taxonomic sequence of the Check-list of North and Middle American Birds, 7th edition through the 63rd Supplement, published by the American Ornithological Society (AOS). Common and scientific names are also those of the Check-list, except that the common names of families are from the Clements taxonomy because the AOS list does not include them.

The following tag has been used to highlight accidentals. Untagged species are common residents, migrants, or seasonal visitors.

- (A) Accidental – a species that rarely or accidentally occurs in Greenland

== Ducks, geese, and waterfowl ==
Order: Anseriformes Family: Anatidae

Anatidae includes the ducks and most duck-like waterfowl, such as geese and swans. These birds are adapted to an aquatic existence with webbed feet, flattened bills, and feathers that are excellent at shedding water due to an oily coating.

- Emperor goose, Anser canagica (A)
- Snow goose, Anser caerulescens
- Graylag goose, Anser anser (A)
- Greater white-fronted goose, Anser albifrons
- Pink-footed goose, Anser brachyrhynchus
- Brant, Branta bernicla
- Barnacle goose, Branta leucopsis
- Cackling goose, Branta hutchinsii
- Canada goose, Branta canadensis
- Tundra swan, Cygnus columbianus (A)
- Whooper swan, Cygnus cygnus
- Ruddy shelduck, Tadorna ferruginea (A)
- Common shelduck, Tadorna tadorna (A)
- Blue-winged teal, Spatula discors (A)
- Northern shoveler, Spatula clypeata (A)
- Gadwall, Mareca strepera (A)
- Eurasian wigeon, Mareca penelope (A)
- American wigeon, Mareca americana (A)
- Mallard, Anas platyrhynchos
- American black duck, Anas rubripes (A)
- Northern pintail, Anas acuta
- Green-winged teal, Anas crecca
- Redhead, Aythya americana (A)
- Ring-necked duck, Aythya collaris (A)
- Tufted duck, Aythya fuligula (A)
- Greater scaup, Aythya marila (A)
- Lesser scaup, Aythya affinis (A)
- Steller's eider, Polysticta stelleri (A)
- King eider, Somateria spectabilis
- Common eider, Somateria mollissima
- Harlequin duck, Histrionicus histrionicus
- Surf scoter, Melanitta perspicillata (A)
- Velvet scoter, Melanitta fusca (A)
- White-winged scoter, Melanitta deglandi (A)
- Common scoter, Melanitta nigra (A)
- Long-tailed duck, Clangula hyemalis
- Bufflehead, Bucephala albeola (A)
- Common goldeneye, Bucephala clangula (A)
- Barrow's goldeneye, Bucephala islandica
- Common merganser, Mergus merganser (A)
- Red-breasted merganser, Mergus serrator

== Pheasants, grouse, and allies ==
Order: Galliformes Family: Phasianidae

Grouse are game birds which are similar to quails and partridges.

- Willow ptarmigan, Lagopus lagopus
- Rock ptarmigan, Lagopus muta

== Grebes ==
Order: Podicipediformes Family: Podicipedidae

Grebes are small to medium-large freshwater diving birds. They have lobed toes and are excellent swimmers and divers. However, they have their feet placed far back on the body, making them quite ungainly on land.

- Horned grebe, Podiceps auritus (A)
- Red-necked grebe, Podiceps grisegena (A)
- Eared grebe, Podiceps nigricollis (A)

== Pigeons and doves ==
Order: Columbiformes Family: Columbidae

Pigeons and doves are stout-bodied birds with short necks and short slender bills with a fleshy cere.

- Rock pigeon, Columba livia (Introduced)
- Mourning dove, Zenaida macroura (A)

== Cuckoos ==
Order: Cuculiformes Family: Cuculidae

The family Cuculidae includes cuckoos, roadrunners, and anis. These birds are of variable size with slender bodies, long tails, and strong legs. The Old World cuckoos are brood parasites.

- Common cuckoo, Cuculus canorus (A)
- Yellow-billed cuckoo, Coccyzus americanus (A)
- Black-billed cuckoo, Coccyzus erythropthalmus (A)

== Nightjars and allies ==
Order: Caprimulgiformes Family: Caprimulgidae

Nightjars are medium-sized nocturnal birds that usually nest on the ground. They have long wings, short legs, and very short bills. Most have small feet, of little use for walking, and long pointed wings. Their soft plumage is camouflaged to resemble bark or leaves.

- Common nighthawk, Chordeiles minor (A)

== Swifts ==
Order: Apodiformes Family: Apodidae

Swifts are small birds which spend the majority of their lives flying. These birds have very short legs and never settle voluntarily on the ground, perching instead only on vertical surfaces. Many swifts have long swept-back wings which resemble a crescent or boomerang.

- Chimney swift, Chaetura pelagica (A)
- Common swift, Apus apus (A)

== Rails, gallinules, and coots ==
Order: Gruiformes Family: Rallidae

Rallidae is a large family of small to medium-sized birds which includes the rails, crakes, coots, and gallinules. Typically they inhabit dense vegetation in damp environments near lakes, swamps, or rivers. In general they are shy and secretive birds, making them difficult to observe. Most species have strong legs and long toes which are well adapted to soft uneven surfaces. They tend to have short, rounded wings and to be weak fliers.

- Virginia rail, Rallus limicola (A)
- Water rail, Rallus aquaticus (A) (Not on the AOS Check-list)
- Corn crake, Crex crex (A)
- Sora, Porzana carolina (A)
- Common gallinule, Gallinula galeata (A)
- Eurasian coot, Fulica atra (A)
- American coot, Fulica americana (A)
- Spotted crake, Porzana porzana (A)
- Purple gallinule, Porphyrio martinicus (A)

== Cranes ==
Order: Gruiformes Family: Gruidae

Cranes are large, long-legged, and long-necked birds. Unlike the similar-looking but unrelated herons, cranes fly with necks outstretched, not pulled back. Most have elaborate and noisy courting displays or "dances".

- Sandhill crane, Antigone canadensis (A)
- Common crane, Grus grus (A)

== Stilts and avocets ==
Order: Charadriiformes Family: Recurvirostridae

Recurvirostridae is a family of large wading birds which includes the avocets and stilts. The avocets have long legs and long up-curved bills. The stilts have extremely long legs and long, thin, straight bills.

- American avocet, Recurvirostra americana (A)

== Oystercatchers ==
Order: Charadriiformes Family: Haematopodidae

The oystercatchers are large and noisy plover-like birds, with strong bills used for smashing or prising open molluscs.

- Eurasian oystercatcher, Haematopus ostralegus (A)

== Plovers and lapwings ==
Order: Charadriiformes Family: Charadriidae

The family Charadriidae includes the plovers, dotterels and lapwings. They are small to medium-sized birds with compact bodies, short, thick necks and long, usually pointed, wings. They are found in open country worldwide, mostly in habitats near water.

- Northern lapwing, Vanellus vanellus (A)
- Black-bellied plover, Pluvialis squatarola
- European golden-plover, Pluvialis apricaria
- American golden-plover, Pluvialis dominica (A)
- Pacific golden-plover, Pluvialis fulva (A)
- Killdeer, Charadrius vociferus (A)
- Common ringed plover, Charadrius hiaticula
- Semipalmated plover, Charadrius semipalmatus (A)
- Oriental plover, Charadrius veredus (A)

== Sandpipers and allies ==
Order: Charadriiformes Family: Scolopacidae

Scolopacidae is a large diverse family of small to medium-sized shorebirds including the sandpipers, curlews, godwits, shanks, tattlers, woodcocks, snipes, dowitchers, and phalaropes. The majority of these species eat small invertebrates picked out of the mud or soil. Variation in length of legs and bills enables multiple species to feed in the same habitat, particularly on the coast, without direct competition for food.

- Upland sandpiper, Bartramia longicauda (A)
- Whimbrel, Numenius phaeopus
- Eskimo curlew, Numenius borealis (A) (probably extinct)
- Eurasian curlew, Numenius arquata (A)
- Black-tailed godwit, Limosa limosa (A)
- Ruddy turnstone, Arenaria interpres
- Red knot, Calidris canutus
- Ruff, Calidris pugnax (A)
- Curlew sandpiper, Calidris ferruginea (A)
- Temminck's stint, Calidris temminckii (A)
- Sanderling, Calidris alba
- Dunlin, Calidris alpina
- Purple sandpiper, Calidris maritima
- Little stint, Calidris minuta (A)
- Baird's sandpiper, Calidris bairdii
- Least sandpiper, Calidris minutilla (A)
- White-rumped sandpiper, Calidris fuscicollis (A)
- Buff-breasted sandpiper, Calidris subruficollis (A)
- Pectoral sandpiper, Calidris melanotos (A)
- Semipalmated sandpiper, Calidris pusilla (A)
- Long-billed dowitcher, Limnodromus scolopaceus (A)
- Eurasian woodcock, Scolopax rusticola (A)
- Common snipe, Gallinago gallinago (A)
- Wilson's snipe, Gallinago delicata (A)
- Spotted sandpiper, Actitis macularia (A)
- Solitary sandpiper, Tringa solitaria (A)
- Lesser yellowlegs, Tringa flavipes (A)
- Common greenshank, Tringa nebularia (A)
- Greater yellowlegs, Tringa melanoleuca (A)
- Common redshank, Tringa totanus (A)
- Wood sandpiper, Tringa glareola (A)
- Red-necked phalarope, Phalaropus lobatus
- Red phalarope, Phalaropus fulicarius

== Skuas and jaegers ==
Order: Charadriiformes Family: Stercorariidae

The family Stercorariidae are, in general, medium to large birds, typically with grey or brown plumage, often with white markings on the wings. They nest on the ground in temperate and arctic regions and are long-distance migrants.

- Great skua, Stercorarius skua
- South polar skua, Stercorarius maccormicki (A)
- Pomarine jaeger, Stercorarius pomarinus
- Parasitic jaeger, Stercorarius parasiticus
- Long-tailed jaeger, Stercorarius longicaudus

== Auks, murres, and puffins ==
Order: Charadriiformes Family: Alcidae

Alcids are superficially similar to penguins due to their black-and-white colours, their upright posture, and some of their habits. However, they are not related to the penguins and differ in being able to fly. Auks live on the open sea, only deliberately coming ashore to nest.

- Dovekie, Alle alle
- Common murre, Uria aalge
- Thick-billed murre, Uria lomvia
- Razorbill, Alca torda
- Great auk, Pinguinus impennis (extinct)
- Black guillemot, Cepphus grylle
- Crested auklet, Aethia cristatella (A)
- Atlantic puffin, Fratercula arctica
- Horned puffin, Fratercula corniculata (A)
- Tufted puffin, Fratercula cirrhata (A)

== Gulls, terns, and skimmers ==
Order: Charadriiformes Family: Laridae

Laridae is a family of medium to large seabirds and includes gulls, kittiwakes, terns, and skimmers. They are typically grey or white, often with black markings on the head or wings. They have longish bills and webbed feet. Terns are a group of generally medium to large seabirds typically with grey or white plumage, often with black markings on the head. Most terns hunt fish by diving but some pick insects off the surface of fresh water. Terns are generally long-lived birds, with several species known to live in excess of 30 years

- Black-legged kittiwake, Rissa tridactyla
- Ivory gull, Pagophila eburnea
- Sabine's gull, Xema sabini
- Bonaparte's gull, Chroicocephalus philadelphia (A)
- Black-headed gull, Chroicocephalus ridibundus
- Little gull, Hydrocoloeus minutus (A)
- Ross's gull, Rhodostethia rosea
- Laughing gull, Leucophaeus atricilla (A)
- Franklin's gull, Leucophaeus pipixcan (A)
- Common gull, Larus canus (A)
- Ring-billed gull, Larus delawarensis (A)
- Herring gull, Larus argentatus (A)
- Iceland gull, Larus glaucoides
- Lesser black-backed gull, Larus fuscus (A)
- Glaucous gull, Larus hyperboreus
- Great black-backed gull, Larus marinus
- Black tern, Chlidonias niger (A)
- Arctic tern, Sterna paradisaea

== Loons ==
Order: Gaviiformes Family: Gaviidae

Loons, known as divers in Europe, are a group of aquatic birds found in many parts of North America and northern Europe. They are the size of a large duck or small goose, which they somewhat resemble when swimming, but to which they are completely unrelated.

- Red-throated loon, Gavia stellata
- Pacific loon, Gavia pacifica (A)
- Common loon, Gavia immer
- Yellow-billed loon, Gavia adamsii (A)

== Albatrosses ==
Order: Procellariiformes Family: Diomedeidae

The albatrosses are among the largest of flying birds, and the great albatrosses of the genus Diomedea have the largest wingspans of any extant birds.

- Yellow-nosed albatross, Thalassarche chlororhynchos (A)
- Black-browed albatross, Thalassarche melanophris (A)

== Southern storm petrels ==
Order: Procellariiformes Family: Oceanitidae

The storm petrels are the smallest seabirds, relatives of the petrels, feeding on planktonic crustaceans and small fish picked from the surface, typically while hovering. The flight is fluttering and sometimes bat-like. Until 2018, this family's species were included with the other storm petrels in family Hydrobatidae.

- Wilson's storm petrel, Oceanites oceanicus (A)

== Northern storm petrels ==
Order: Procellariiformes Family: Hydrobatidae

The northern storm petrels are the smallest seabirds. They feed on planktonic crustaceans and small fish picked from the surface, typically while hovering. The flight is fluttering and sometimes bat-like.

- Leach's storm petrel, Hydrobates leucorhous (A)

== Shearwaters and petrels ==
Order: Procellariiformes Family: Procellariidae

The procellariids are the main group of medium-sized "true petrels", characterised by united nostrils with medium septum and a long outer functional primary.

- Northern fulmar, Fulmarus glacialis
- Sooty shearwater, Ardenna griseus (A)
- Great shearwater, Ardenna gravis
- Manx shearwater, Puffinus puffinus (A)

== Boobies and gannets ==
Order: Suliformes Family: Sulidae

The sulids comprise the gannets and boobies. Both groups are medium to large coastal seabirds that plunge-dive for fish.

- Northern gannet, Morus bassanus (A)

== Cormorants and shags ==
Order: Suliformes Family: Phalacrocoracidae

Phalacrocoracidae is a family of medium to large coastal, fish-eating seabirds that includes cormorants and shags. Plumage colouration varies, with the majority having mainly dark plumage, some species being black-and-white, and a few being colourful.

- Great cormorant, Phalacrocorax carbo

== Herons, egrets, and bitterns ==
Order: Pelecaniformes Family: Ardeidae

The family Ardeidae contains the bitterns, herons, and egrets. Herons and egrets are medium to large wading birds with long necks and legs. Bitterns tend to be shorter-necked and more wary. Members of Ardeidae fly with their necks retracted, unlike other long-necked birds such as storks, ibises, and spoonbills.

- American bittern, Botaurus lentiginosus (A)
- Great blue heron, Ardea herodias (A)
- Gray heron, Ardea cinerea (A)
- Little blue heron, Egretta caerulea (A)
- Cattle egret, Bubulcus ibis (A)
- Green heron, Butorides virescens (A)
- Black-crowned night-heron, Nycticorax nycticorax (A)

== Ibises and spoonbills ==
Order: Pelecaniformes Family: Threskiornithidae

Threskiornithidae is a family of large terrestrial and wading birds which includes the ibises and spoonbills. They have long, broad wings with 11 primary and about 20 secondary feathers. They are strong fliers and despite their size and weight, very capable soarers.

- Glossy ibis, Plegadis falcinellus (A)
- Eurasian spoonbill, Platalea leucorodia (A)

== Osprey ==
Order: Accipitriformes Family: Pandionidae

The family Pandionidae contains only one species, the osprey. The osprey is a medium-large raptor which is a specialist fish-eater with a worldwide distribution.

- Osprey, Pandion haliaetus (A)

== Hawks, eagles, and kites ==
Order: Accipitriformes Family: Accipitridae

Accipitridae is a family of birds of prey which includes hawks, eagles, kites, harriers, and Old World vultures. These birds have powerful hooked beaks for tearing flesh from their prey, strong legs, powerful talons, and keen eyesight.

- White-tailed eagle, Haliaeetus albicilla
- Rough-legged hawk, Buteo lagopus (A)

== Owls ==
Order: Strigiformes Family: Strigidae

The typical owls are small to large solitary nocturnal birds of prey. They have large forward-facing eyes and ears, a hawk-like beak, and a conspicuous circle of feathers around each eye called a facial disk.

- Snowy owl, Bubo scandiacus
- Short-eared owl, Asio flammeus

== Kingfishers ==
Order: Coraciiformes Family: Alcedinidae

Kingfishers are medium-sized birds with large heads, long pointed bills, short legs, and stubby tails.

- Belted kingfisher, Megaceryle alcyon (A)

== Woodpeckers ==
Order: Piciformes Family: Picidae

Woodpeckers are small to medium-sized birds with chisel-like beaks, short legs, stiff tails, and long tongues used for capturing insects. Some species have feet with two toes pointing forward and two backward, while several species have only three toes. Many woodpeckers have the habit of tapping noisily on tree trunks with their beaks.

- Yellow-bellied sapsucker, Sphyrapicus varius (A)

== Falcons and caracaras ==
Order: Falconiformes Family: Falconidae

Falconidae is a family of diurnal birds of prey. They differ from hawks, eagles and kites in that they kill with their beaks instead of their talons.

- Eurasian kestrel, Falco tinnunculus (A)
- Merlin, Falco columbarius (A)
- Gyrfalcon, Falco rusticolus
- Peregrine falcon, Falco peregrinus

== Tyrant flycatchers ==
Order: Passeriformes Family: Tyrannidae

Tyrant flycatchers are passerine birds which occur throughout North and South America. They superficially resemble the Old World flycatchers, but are more robust and have stronger bills. They do not have the sophisticated vocal capabilities of the songbirds. Most, but not all, have plain colouring. As the name implies, most are insectivorous.

- Eastern kingbird, Tyrannus tyrannus (A)
- Olive-sided flycatcher, Contopus cooperi (A)
- Yellow-bellied flycatcher, Empidonax flaviventris (A)

== Vireos, shrike-babblers, and erpornis ==
Order: Passeriformes Family: Vireonidae

The vireos are a group of small to medium-sized passerine birds. They are typically greenish in colour and resemble wood-warblers apart from their heavier bills.

- Blue-headed vireo, Vireo solitarius (A)
- Red-eyed vireo, Vireo olivaceus (A)

== Crows, jays, and magpies ==
Order: Passeriformes Family: Corvidae

The family Corvidae includes crows, ravens, jays, choughs, magpies, treepies, nutcrackers, and ground jays. Corvids are above average in size among the Passeriformes, and some of the larger species show high levels of intelligence.

- Eurasian jackdaw, Corvus monedula (A)
- Rook, Corvus frugilegus (A)
- Hooded crow, Corvus cornix (A)
- Common raven, Corvus corax

== Larks ==
Order: Passeriformes Family: Alaudidae

Larks are small terrestrial birds with often extravagant songs and display flights. Most larks are fairly dull in appearance. Their food is insects and seeds.

- Horned lark, Eremophila alpestris (A)

== Swallows ==
Order: Passeriformes Family: Hirundinidae

The family Hirundinidae is adapted to aerial feeding. They have a slender streamlined body, long pointed wings, and a short bill with a wide gape. The feet are adapted to perching rather than walking, and the front toes are partially joined at the base.

- Tree swallow, Tachycineta bicolor (A)
- Barn swallow, Hirundo rustica (A)
- Common house-martin, Delichon urbica (A)
- Cliff swallow, Petrochelidon pyrrhonota (A)

== Leaf warblers ==
Order: Passeriformes Family: Phylloscopidae

Leaf warblers are a family of small insectivorous birds found mostly in Eurasia and ranging into Wallacea and Africa. The species are of various sizes, often green-plumaged above and yellow below, or more subdued with greyish-green to greyish-brown colours.

- Willow warbler, Phylloscopus trochilus (A)

== Sylviid warblers, parrotbills, and allies ==
Order: Passeriformes Family: Sylviidae

The family Sylviidae is a group of small insectivorous passerine birds. They mainly occur as breeding species, as the common name implies, in Europe, Asia and, to a lesser extent, Africa. Most are of generally undistinguished appearance, but many have distinctive songs.

- Eurasian blackcap, Sylvia atricapilla (A)

== Kinglets ==
Order: Passeriformes Family: Regulidae

The kinglets and "crests" are a small family of birds which resemble some warblers. They are very small insectivorous birds. The adults have coloured crowns, giving rise to their name.

- Ruby-crowned kinglet, Corthylio calendula (A)

== Waxwings ==
Order: Passeriformes Family: Bombycillidae

The waxwings are a group of birds with soft silky plumage and unique red tips to some of the wing feathers. In the Bohemian and cedar waxwings, these tips look like sealing wax and give the group its name. These are arboreal birds of northern forests. They live on insects in summer and berries in winter.

- Bohemian waxwing, Bombycilla garrulus (A)

== Wrens ==
Order: Passeriformes Family: Troglodytidae

The wrens are mainly small and inconspicuous except for their loud songs. These birds have short wings and thin down-turned bills. Several species often hold their tails upright. All are insectivorous.

- Marsh wren, Cistothorus palustris (A)

== Starlings ==
Order: Passeriformes Family: Sturnidae

Starlings are small to medium-sized passerine birds. Their flight is strong and direct and they are very gregarious. Their preferred habitat is fairly open country. They eat insects and fruit. Plumage is typically dark with a metallic sheen.

- European starling, Sturnus vulgaris (A)

== Thrushes and allies ==
Order: Passeriformes Family: Turdidae

The thrushes are a group of passerine birds that occur mainly in the Old World. They are plump, soft plumaged, small to medium-sized insectivores or sometimes omnivores, often feeding on the ground. Many have attractive songs.

- White's thrush, Zoothera dauma (A)
- Gray-cheeked thrush, Catharus minimus (A)
- Hermit thrush, Catharus guttatus (A)
- Eurasian blackbird, Turdus merula (A)
- Fieldfare, Turdus pilaris
- Redwing, Turdus iliacus
- Song thrush, Turdus philomelos (A)
- American robin, Turdus migratorius (A)

== Old World flycatchers ==
Order: Passeriformes Family: Muscicapidae

Old World flycatchers are a large group of small passerine birds native to the Old World. They are mainly small arboreal insectivores. The appearance of these birds is highly varied, but they mostly have weak songs and harsh calls.

- Northern wheatear, Oenanthe oenanthe

== Old World sparrows ==
Order: Passeriformes Family: Passeridae

Old World sparrows are small passerine birds. In general, sparrows tend to be small plump brownish or greyish birds with short tails and short powerful beaks. Sparrows are seed eaters, but they also consume small insects.

- House sparrow, Passer domesticus (extirpated)

== Wagtails and pipits ==
Order: Passeriformes Family: Motacillidae

Motacillidae is a family of small passerine birds with medium to long tails which includes the wagtails, longclaws, and pipits. They are slender ground-feeding insectivores of open country.

- White wagtail, Motacilla alba
- American pipit, Anthus rubescens
- Meadow pipit, Anthus pratensis

== Finches, euphonias, and allies ==
Order: Passeriformes Family: Fringillidae

Finches are seed-eating passerine birds that are small to moderately large and have a strong beak, usually conical and in some species very large. All have twelve tail feathers and nine primaries. These birds have a bouncing flight with alternating bouts of flapping and gliding on closed wings, and most sing well.

- Common chaffinch, Fringilla coelebs (A)
- Pine grosbeak, Pinicola enucleator (A)
- Common redpoll, Acanthis flammea
- Lesser redpoll, Acanthis cabaret (A)
- Hoary redpoll, Acanthis hornemanni
- Red crossbill, Loxia curvirostra (A)
- White-winged crossbill, Loxia leucoptera (A)
- Pine siskin, Spinus pinus (A)

== Longspurs and snow buntings ==
Order: Passeriformes Family: Calcariidae

The Calcariidae are a group of passerine birds that had been traditionally grouped with the New World sparrows, but differ in a number of respects and are usually found in open grassy areas.

- Lapland longspur, Calcarius lapponicus
- Snow bunting, Plectrophenax nivalis

== New world sparrows ==
Order: Passeriformes Family: Passerellidae

Until 2017, these species were considered part of the family Emberizidae. Most of the species are known as sparrows, but these birds are not closely related to the Old World sparrows which are in the family Passeridae. Many of these have distinctive head patterns.

- Fox sparrow, Passerella iliaca (A)
- Dark-eyed junco, Junco hyemalis (A)
- White-crowned sparrow, Zonotrichia leucophrys (A)
- Savannah sparrow, Passerculus sandwichensis (A)
- Lincoln's sparrow, Melospiza lincolnii (A)

== Yellow-breasted chat ==
Order: Passeriformes Family: Icteriidae

This species was historically placed in the wood-warblers (Parulidae) but nonetheless most authorities were unsure if it belonged there. It was placed in its own family in 2017.

- Yellow-breasted chat, Icteria virens (A)

== Troupials and allies ==
Order: Passeriformes Family: Icteridae

The icterids are a group of small to medium-sized, often colourful, passerine birds restricted to the New World and include the grackles, New World blackbirds, and New World orioles. Most species have black as the predominant plumage colour, often enlivened by yellow, orange, or red.

- Yellow-headed blackbird, Xanthocephalus xanthocephalus (A)
- Bobolink, Dolichonyx oryzivorus (A)
- Baltimore oriole, Icterus galbula (A)
- Rusty blackbird, Euphagus carolinus (A)

== New World warblers ==
Order: Passeriformes Family: Parulidae

The wood-warblers are a group of small, often colourful, passerine birds restricted to the New World. Most are arboreal, but some are terrestrial. Most members of this family are insectivores.

- Ovenbird, Seiurus aurocapilla (A)
- Louisiana waterthrush, Parkesia motacilla (A)
- Northern waterthrush, Parkesia noveboracensis (A)
- Golden-winged warbler, Vermivora chrysoptera (A)
- Tennessee warbler, Leiothlypis peregrina (A)
- Orange-crowned warbler, Leiothlypis celata (A)
- Nashville warbler, Leiothlypis ruficapilla (A)
- Mourning warbler, Geothlypis philadelphia (A)
- Common yellowthroat, Geothlypis trichas (A)
- American redstart, Setophaga ruticilla (A)
- Northern parula, Setophaga americana (A)
- Magnolia warbler, Setophaga magnolia (A)
- Bay-breasted warbler, Setophaga castanea (A)
- Blackburnian warbler, Setophaga fusca (A)
- Yellow warbler, Setophaga petechia (A)
- Chestnut-sided warbler, Setophaga pensylvanica (A)
- Blackpoll warbler, Setophaga striata (A)
- Black-throated blue warbler, Setophaga caerulescens (A)
- Pine warbler, Setophaga pinus (A)
- Yellow-rumped warbler, Setophaga coronata (A)
- Black-throated green warbler, Setophaga virens (A)
- Canada warbler, Cardellina canadensis (A)
- Wilson's warbler, Cardellina pusilla (A)

== Cardinals and allies ==
Order: Passeriformes Family: Cardinalidae

The cardinals are a family of robust seed-eating birds with strong bills. They are typically associated with open woodland. The sexes usually have distinct plumages.

- Rose-breasted grosbeak, Pheucticus ludovicianus (A)

== See also ==
- List of birds
- Lists of birds by region
