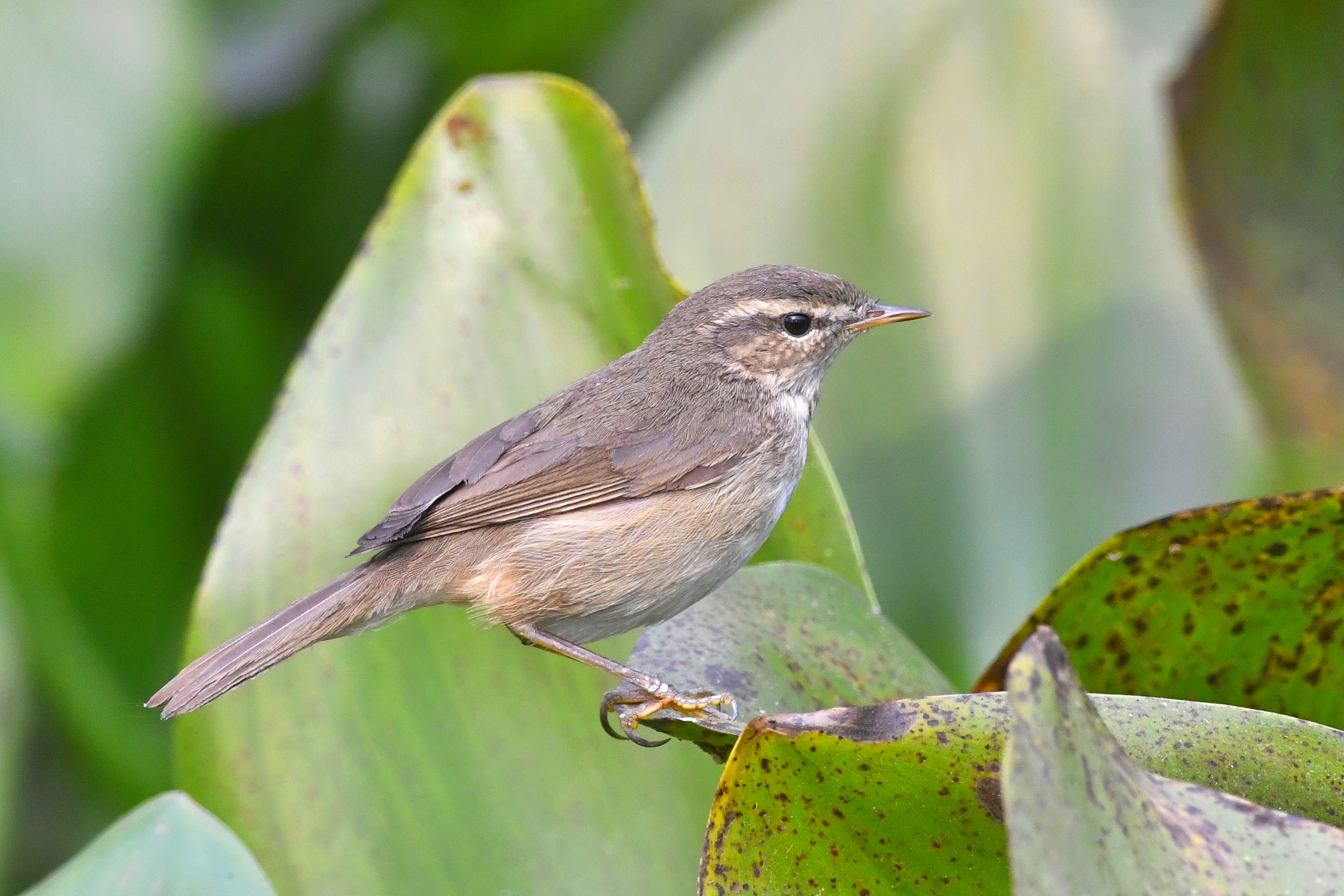
- In Bangladesh

Conservation status
- Least Concern (IUCN 3.1)

Scientific classification
- Kingdom: Animalia
- Phylum: Chordata
- Class: Aves
- Order: Passeriformes
- Family: Phylloscopidae
- Genus: Phylloscopus
- Species: P. fuscatus

Binomial name
- Phylloscopus fuscatus (Blyth, 1842)
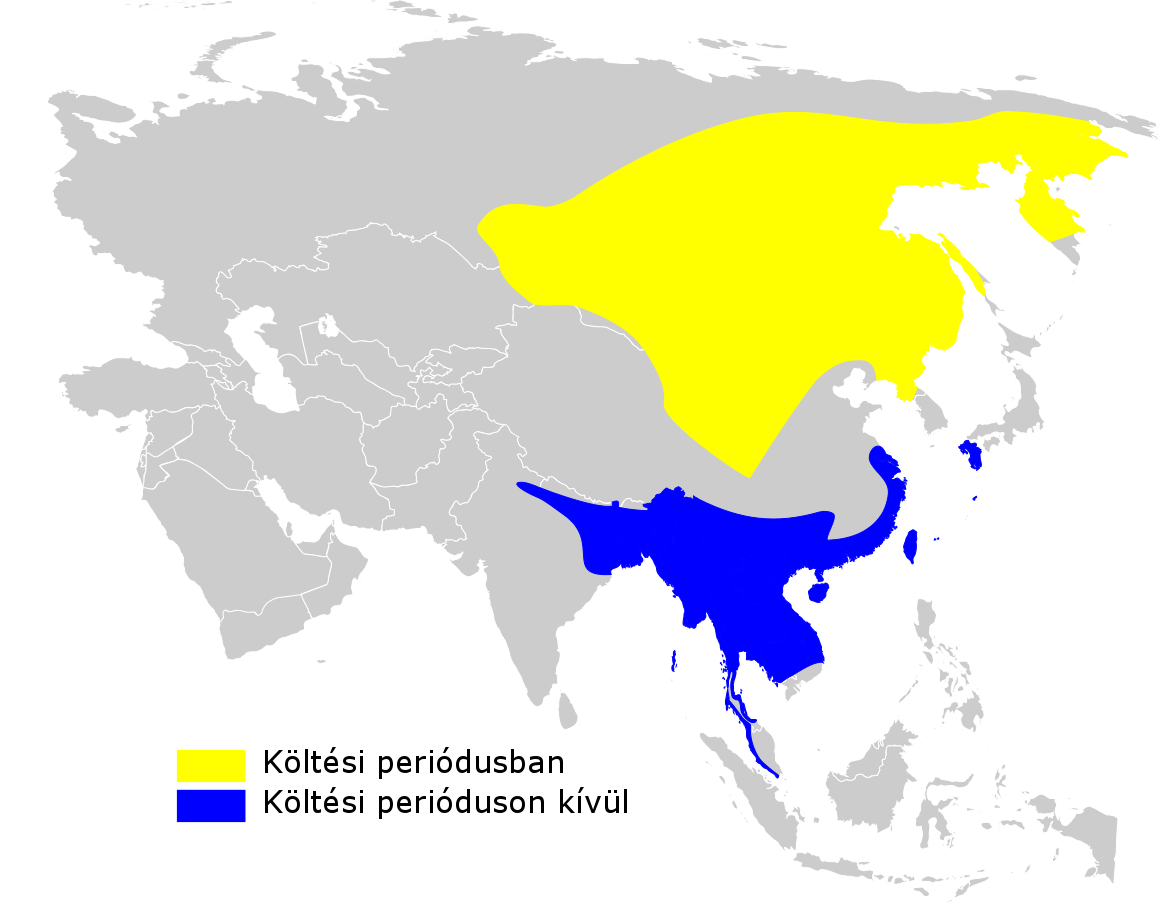
- Distribution of dusky warbler Breeding Non-breeding

= Dusky warbler =

Species of bird

The dusky warbler (Phylloscopus fuscatus) is a leaf warbler which breeds in the east Palearctic. The genus name Phylloscopus is from Ancient Greek phullon, "leaf", and skopos, "seeker" (from skopeo, "to watch"). The specific fuscatus is from Latin fuscus "dark".

This warbler is strongly migratory and winters in South Asia and South-east Asia. It sometimes occurs in North America in Alaska, and has also occurred in California.

This is an abundant bird of taiga bogs and wet meadows. The nest is built low in a bush, and 5–6 eggs are laid. Like most Old World warblers, this small passerine is insectivorous.

The dusky warbler is prone to vagrancy as far as western Europe in October, despite a 3000 km distance from its breeding grounds. It has wintered in Great Britain.

This is a warbler similar in size and shape to a chiffchaff. The adult has an unstreaked brown back and buff underparts. There is a prominent whitish supercilium, and the bill is fine and pointed. The sexes are identical, as with most warblers, but young birds are more olive-tinged above. Like most warblers, it is insectivorous, but will take other small food items, including berries.

The dusky warbler is a strongly migratory species, breeding in northern and eastern Asia, particularly Siberia, Mongolia and northern China. During winter, it migrates south to South and Southeast Asia, including India, Myanmar, Thailand and Malaysia. It typically inhabits dense shrubs, reeds, wet meadows and areas near water. Outside the breeding season, it is usually solitary and forages close to the ground. Its diet consists mainly of insects and larvae, but it may also consume spiders, snails and small seeds. The nest is constructed from dry grasses and fibres, usually in dense vegetation close to the ground, and typically contains four to six eggs.

The song is a monotonous whistle, and the call is a harsh check. The call is often the first clue that this typically skulking species is present, away from the breeding grounds.

An individual of this locally rare species was detected in an urban park and later ringed in December 2025 in Porto, Portugal
