= Dark-throated thrush =

Dark-throated thrush can refer to one of two bird species, formerly regarded as conspecific:

- Black-throated thrush Turdus atrogularis
- Red-throated thrush Turdus ruficollis
