= Alfred Laubmann =

German zoologist and ornithologist

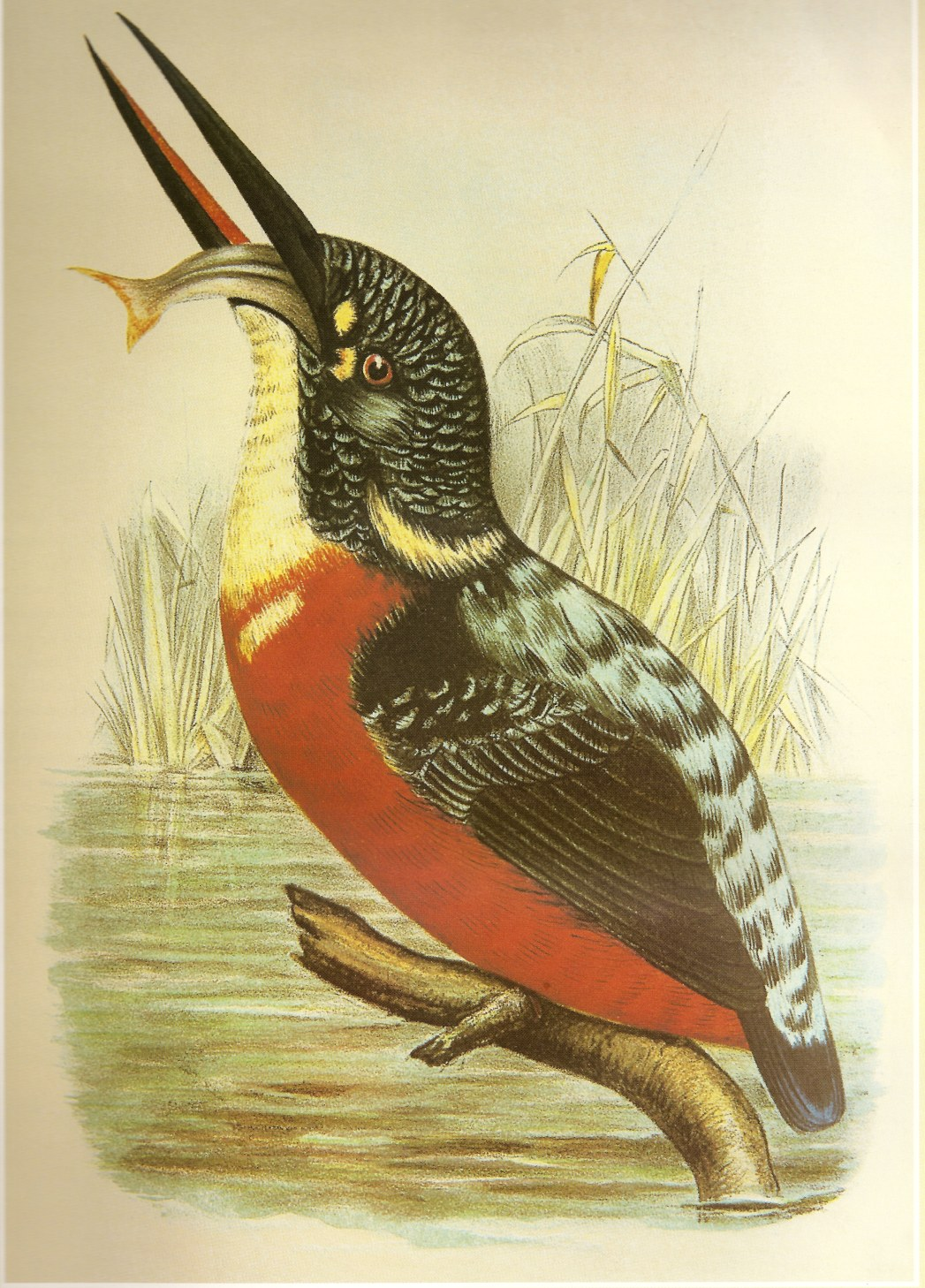
Alcedo Hercules

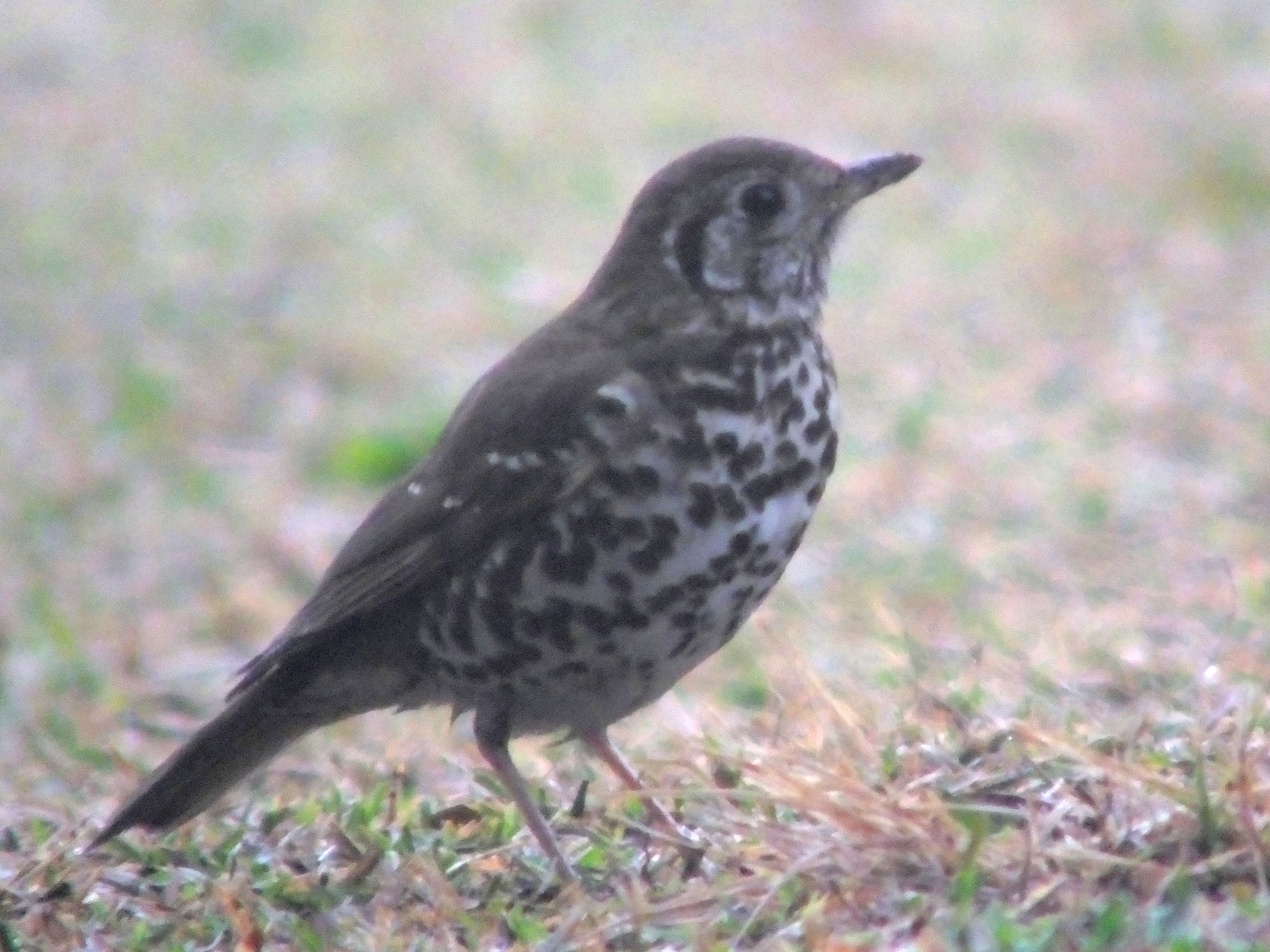
Turdus mupinensis

Alfred Louis Laubmann (20 October 1886 – 18 October 1965) was a German zoologist and ornithologist who worked as curator at the Bavarian State Collection of Zoology in Munich. He worked on avian systematics and was a proponent of extending the trinomial system of subspecies into a quadrinomial system.

Laubmann was born into the merchant family of Eugen Laubmann and Ida. He studied at the local elementary school in Kaufbeuren before studying at the Wilhelms gymnasium in Munich. He then moved in 1906 to Ludwig-Maximilians-Universität München (LMU Munich) to study zoology. He worked on his doctorate under Richard von Hertwig, working on sensory organs in the skin of crayfish. In 1910 he worked at the Roscoff Marine Station. In 1911 he joined the Zoological Museum in Munich to work on the skins collected by Gottfried Merzbacher (1834-1926) from the Tian Shan region. He worked under Carl Hellmayr and was a colleague of Erwin Stresemann. Hellmayr moved to the United States in 1922 which led to Laubmann being promoted to head. He became a curator in 1926. He retired in 1951 and was succeeded by Gerd Diesselhorst.

He was a member of the Ornithological Society of Bavaria from 1907 and served as its secretary from 1913 to 1921 and from 1922 as its Secretary General as well as acting editor and publisher of its journal.

He married Elisabeth Mayer in 1912.

Laubmann described many taxa including the species Alcedo hercules and Otocichla mupinensis. He is also commemorated in the names of several subspecies.
