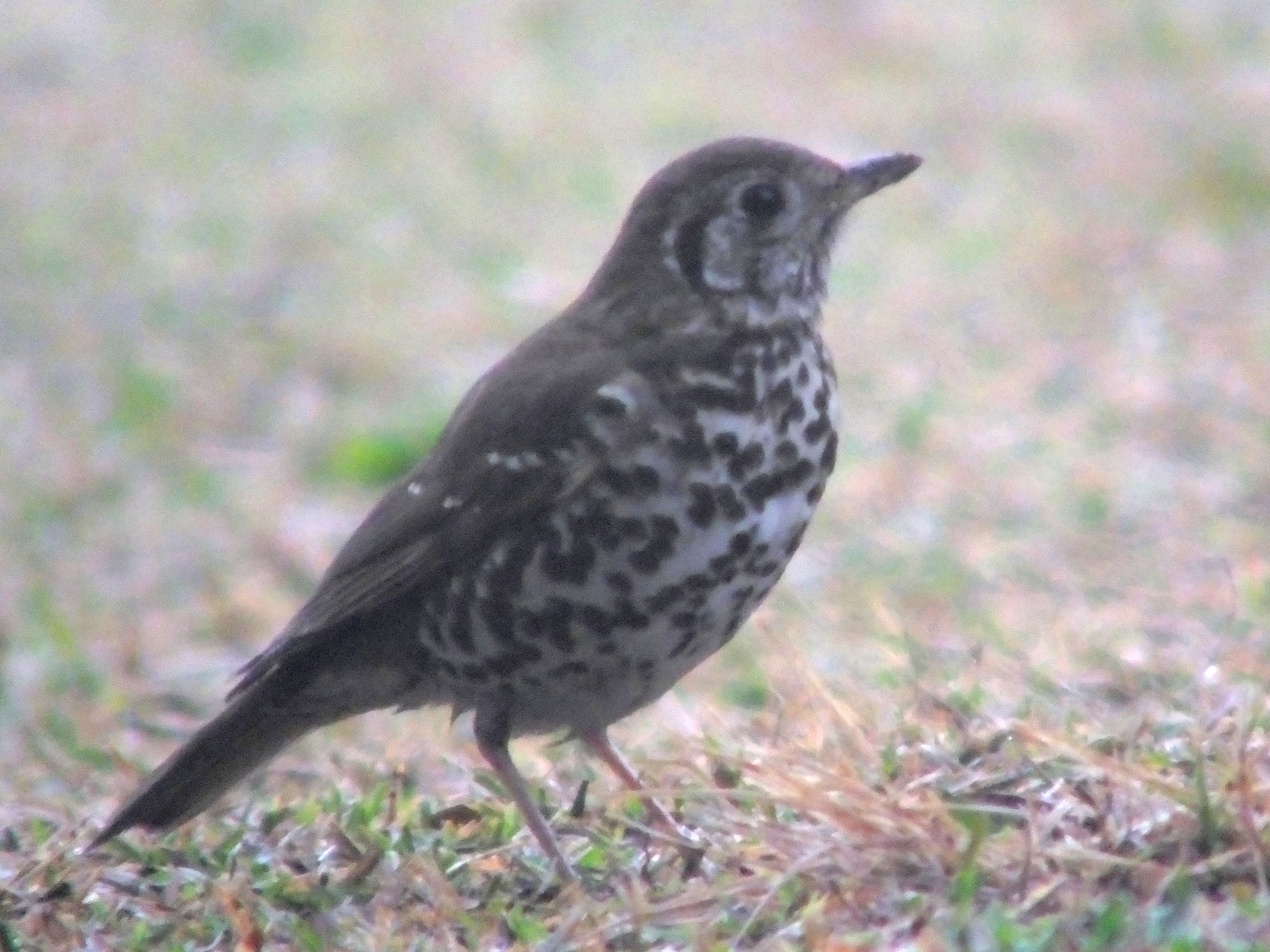

Conservation status
- Least Concern (IUCN 3.1)

Scientific classification
- Kingdom: Animalia
- Phylum: Chordata
- Class: Aves
- Order: Passeriformes
- Family: Turdidae
- Genus: Turdus
- Species: T. mupinensis

Binomial name
- Turdus mupinensis Laubmann, 1920

Synonyms
- Otocichla mupinensis

= Chinese thrush =

Species of bird

The Chinese thrush (Turdus mupinensis) is a species of bird in the family Turdidae. It is found in China and far northern Vietnam. Its natural habitats are temperate forests and subtropical or tropical moist montane forests.

A recent molecular study places the Chinese thrush's closest relatives as the similarly plumaged European species, the song thrush (T. philomelos) and the mistle thrush (T. viscivorus), all three species early offshoots from the main Turdus radiation around the world.
