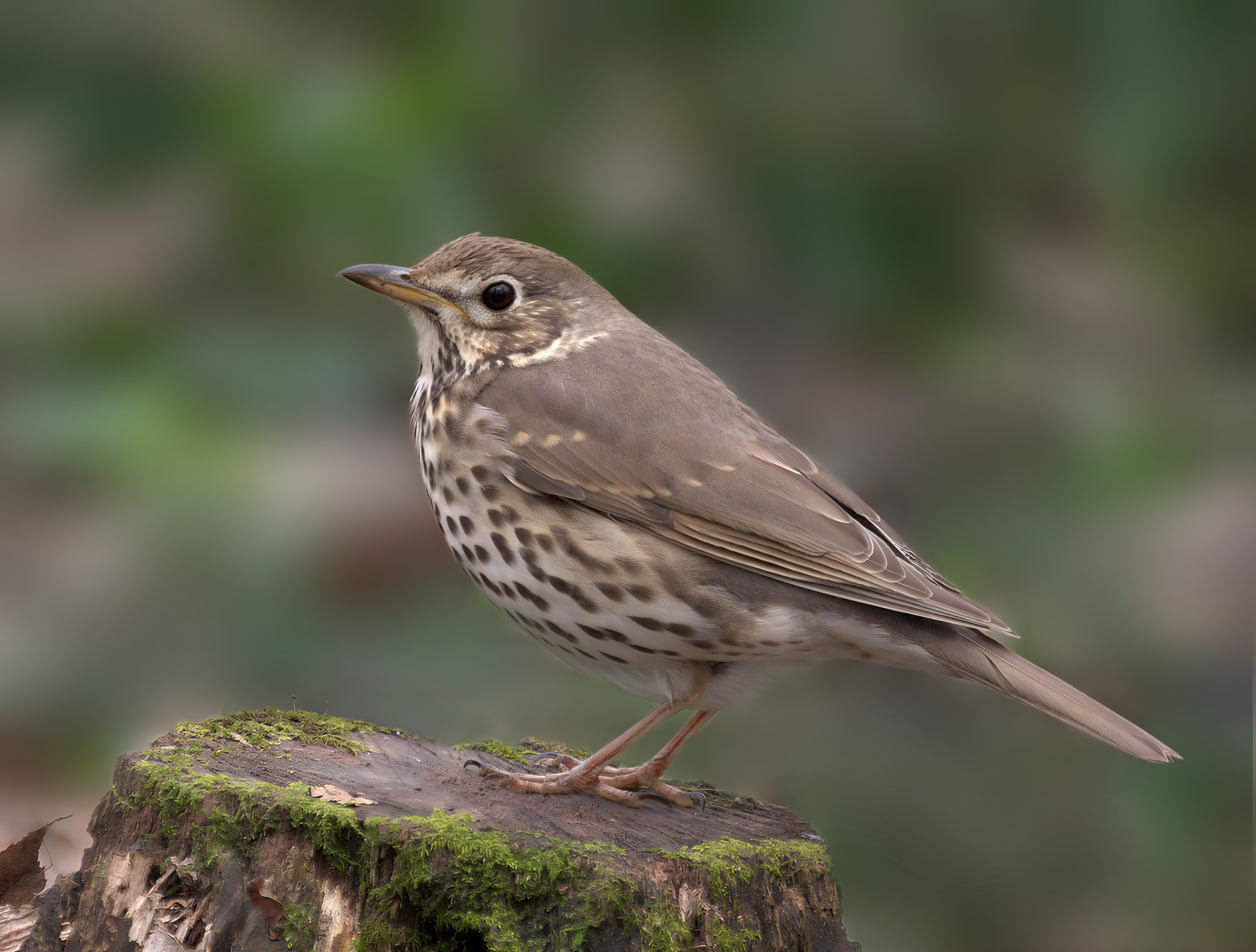

Conservation status
- Least Concern (IUCN 3.1)

Scientific classification
- Kingdom: Animalia
- Phylum: Chordata
- Class: Aves
- Order: Passeriformes
- Family: Turdidae
- Genus: Turdus
- Species: T. philomelos

Binomial name
- Turdus philomelos Brehm, 1831
- Distribution Summer range Year-round range Winter range Introduced range

Synonyms
- Turdus musicus

Audio
- Song

= Song thrush =

Species of bird

The song thrush (Turdus philomelos) is a thrush that breeds across the West Palearctic. It has brown upperparts and black-spotted cream or buff underparts and has four recognised subspecies. Its distinctive song, which features repeated musical phrases, has frequently been referenced in poetry.

The song thrush breeds in forests, gardens and parks. It is partially migratory, with many birds wintering in southern Europe, North Africa and the Middle East. The species has also been introduced into New Zealand and Australia. While it is not globally threatened, serious population declines have been observed in some European regions, potentially due to changes in farming practices.

The song thrush builds a neat, mud-lined cup nest in a bush or tree and lays four to five dark-spotted blue eggs. It is omnivorous and has the habit of using a favourite stone as an "anvil" on which to break open the shells of snails. Like other perching birds (passerines), it is susceptible to external and internal parasites and is vulnerable to predation by cats and birds of prey.

== Taxonomy and systematics ==
=== Name ===
The song thrush was described by German ornithologist Christian Ludwig Brehm in 1831, and still bears its original scientific name, Turdus philomelos. The generic name, Turdus, is the Latin for thrush, and the specific epithet refers to a character in Greek mythology, Philomela, who had her tongue cut out, but was changed into a singing bird. Her name is derived from the Ancient Greek Φιλο philo- (loving), and μέλος melos (song). The dialect names throstle and mavis both mean thrush, being related to the German drossel and French mauvis respectively. Throstle dates back to at least the fourteenth century and was used by Chaucer in the Parliament of Fowls. Mavis is derived via Middle English mavys and Old French mauvis from Middle Breton milhuyt meaning "thrush". Mavis (Μαβής) can also mean "purple" in Greek.

=== Classification ===
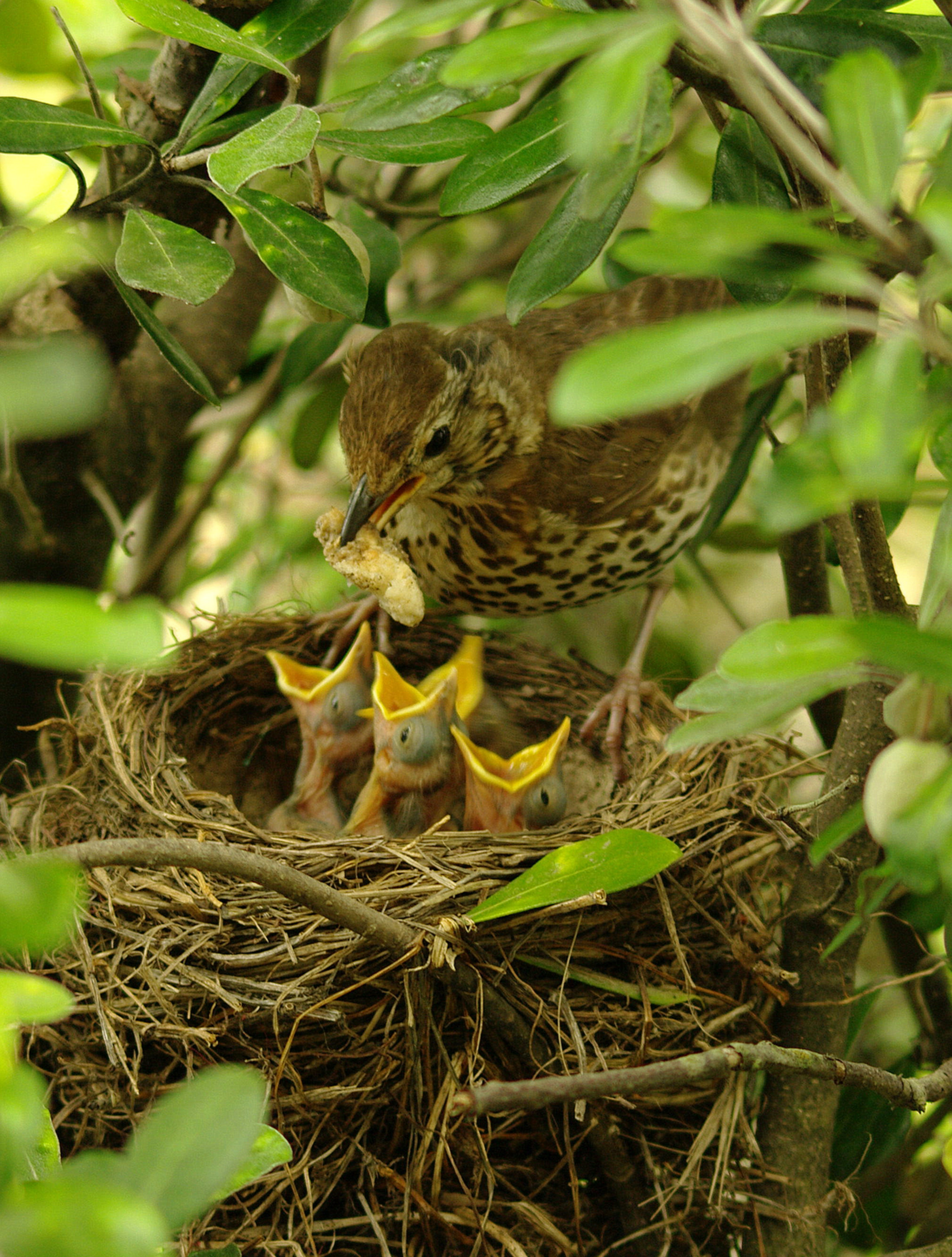
A parent feeding chicks in their nest in a New Zealand garden

A molecular study indicated that the song thrush's closest relatives are the similarly plumaged mistle thrush (T. viscivorus) and Chinese thrush (T. mupinensis); these three species are early offshoots from the Eurasian lineage of Turdus thrushes after they spread north from Africa. They are less closely related to other European thrush species such as the blackbird (T. merula) which are descended from ancestors that had colonised the Canary Islands from Africa and subsequently reached Europe from there.

The song thrush has four subspecies, with the nominate subspecies, T. p. philomelos, covering the majority of the species' range. T. p. hebridensis, described by British ornithologist William Eagle Clarke in 1913, is a mainly sedentary (non-migratory) form found in the Outer Hebrides and Isle of Skye in Scotland, and western Ireland. It is the darkest subspecies, with a dark brown back, greyish rump, pale buff background colour to the underparts and grey-tinged flanks.

T. p. clarkei, described by German zoologist Ernst Hartert in 1909, and named after William Eagle Clarke, breeds in the rest of Great Britain and Ireland and on mainland Europe in France, Belgium, the Netherlands and possibly somewhat further east. It has brown upperparts that are warmer in tone than those of the nominate form, an olive-tinged rump and a rich yellow background colour to the underparts. It is a partial migrant with some birds wintering in southern France and Iberia. This form intergrades with the nominate subspecies in central Europe, and with T. p. hebridensis in the Inner Hebrides and western Scotland, and in these areas birds show intermediate characteristics. Finally, T. p. nataliae, described by the Russian Sergei Buturlin in 1929, occurs in the east of the range in Siberia east of the Ural Mountains.

== Description ==
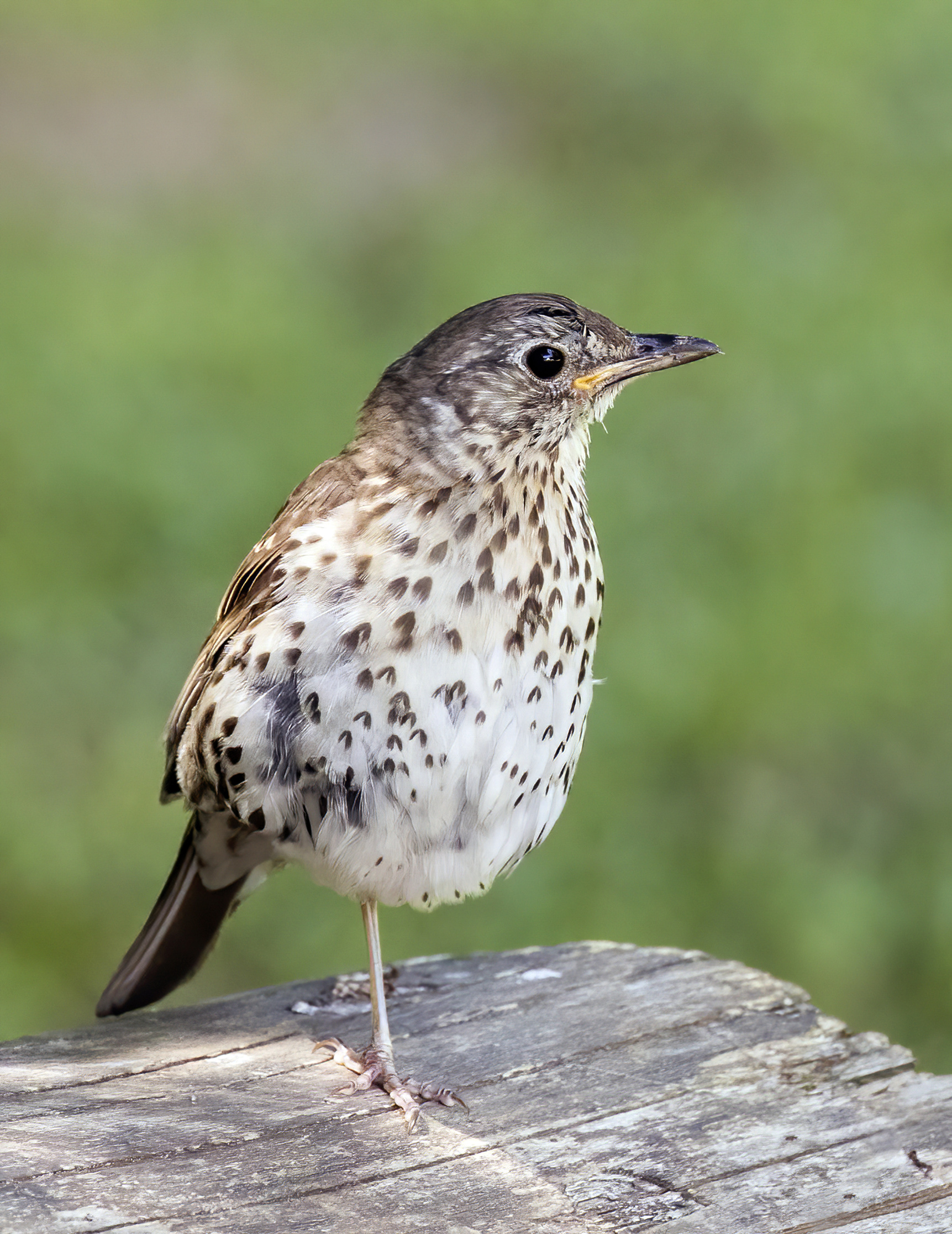
Song thrush in Slovenia

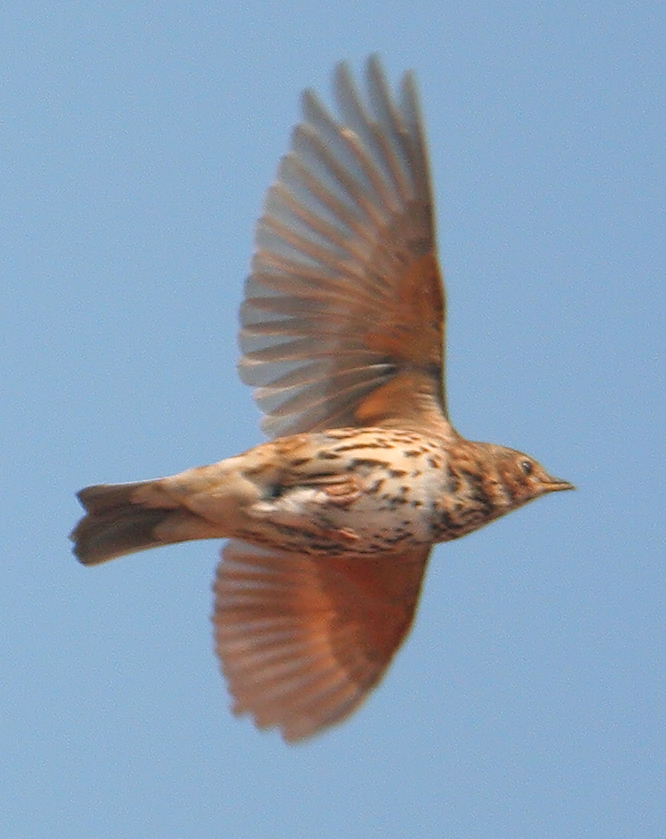
In flight

The song thrush (as represented by the nominate subspecies T. p. philomelos) is 20 to 23.5 centimetres (7 3/4 to 9 1/4 inches) in length and weighs 50 to 107 grams (1 3/4 to 3 3/4 ounces). The sexes are similar, with plain brown backs and neatly black-spotted cream or yellow-buff underparts, becoming paler on the belly. The underwing is warm yellow, the bill is yellowish and the legs and feet are pink. The upperparts of this species become colder in tone from west to east across the breeding range from Sweden to Siberia. The juvenile resembles the adult, but has buff or orange streaks on the back and wing coverts.

The most similar European thrush species is the redwing (T. iliacus), but that bird has a strong white supercilium, red flanks, and shows a red underwing in flight. The mistle thrush (T. viscivorus) is much larger and has white tail corners, and the Chinese thrush (T. mupinensis), although much more similar in plumage, has black face markings and does not overlap in range.

The song thrush has a short, sharp tsip call, replaced on migration by a thin high seep, similar to the redwing's call but shorter. The alarm call is a chook-chook becoming shorter and more strident with increasing danger. The male's song, given from trees, rooftops or other elevated perches, is a loud clear run of musical phrases, repeated two to four times, filip filip filip codidio codidio quitquiquit tittit tittit tereret tereret tereret, and interspersed with grating notes and mimicry. It is given mainly from February to June by the Outer Hebridean race, but from November to July by the more widespread subspecies. For its weight, this species has one of the loudest bird calls.

An individual male may have a repertoire of more than 100 phrases, many of which are copied from its parents and neighbouring birds. Mimicry may include imitating human-made technology like telephones, and the song thrush will also repeat the calls of captive birds, including exotic species such as the white-faced whistling duck.

== Distribution and habitat ==
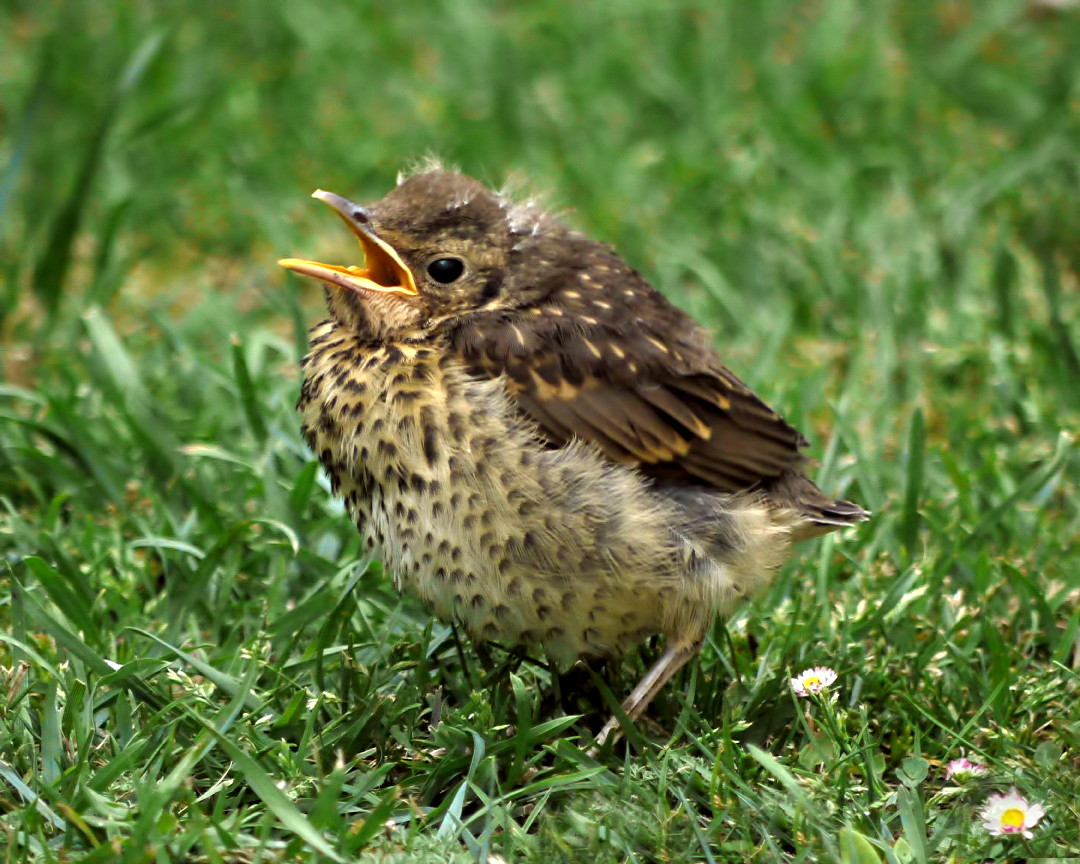
Juvenile in New Zealand

The song thrush breeds in most of Europe (although not in the greater part of Iberia, lowland Italy or southern Greece), and across Ukraine and Russia almost to Lake Baikal. It reaches to 75°N in Norway, but only to about 60°N in Siberia. Birds from Scandinavia, Eastern Europe and Russia winter around the Mediterranean, North Africa and the Middle East, but only some of the birds in the milder west of the breeding range leave their breeding areas. The song thrush has been sighted in North America as a rare vagrant, with records from Quebec in Canada, Greenland, as well as in Alaska, California, and Washington in the United States. It has also been sighted in various Atlantic islands and West Africa. In South America, there is a record of a song thrush from Colombia.

In Great Britain song thrushes are commonly found where there are trees and bushes. Such areas include parks, gardens, coniferous and deciduous woodland and hedgerows.

Birds of the subspecies T. p. clarkei were introduced to New Zealand and Australia by acclimatisation societies between 1860 and 1880, apparently for purely sentimental reasons. In New Zealand, where it was introduced on both the main islands, the song thrush quickly established itself and spread to surrounding islands such as the Kermadecs, Chatham and Auckland Islands. Although it is common and widespread in New Zealand, in Australia only a small population survives around Melbourne. In New Zealand, there appears to be a limited detrimental effect on some invertebrates due to predation by introduced bird species, and the song thrush also damages commercial fruit crops in that country. As an introduced species it has no legal protection in New Zealand, and can be killed at any time.

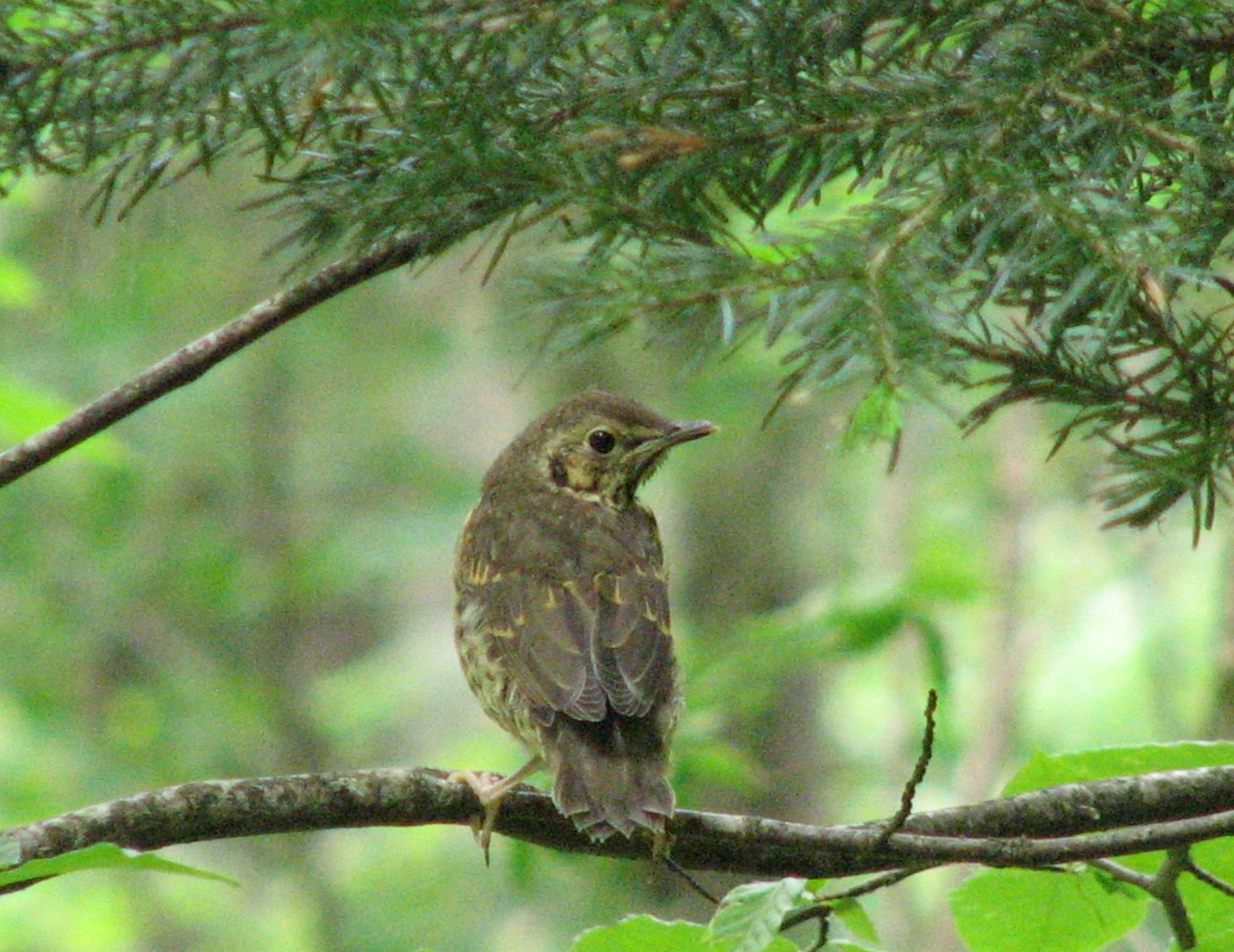
Juvenile in a forest near Dombaih, Russia (Caucasus Mountains)

The song thrush typically nests in forest with good undergrowth and nearby more open areas, and in western Europe also uses gardens and parks. It breeds up to the tree-line, reaching 2,200 metres (7,200 feet) in Switzerland. The island subspecies T. p. hebridensis breeds in more open country, including heathland, and in the east of the song thrush's Eurasian range, the nominate subspecies is restricted to the edge of the dense conifer forests.

In intensively farmed areas where agricultural practices appear to have made cropped land unsuitable, gardens are an important breeding habitat. In one English study, only 3.5% of territories were found in farmland, whereas gardens held 71.5% of the territories, despite that habitat making up only 2% of the total area. The remaining nests were in woodlands (1% of total area).

The winter habitat is similar to that used for breeding, except that high ground and other exposed localities are avoided; however, the island subspecies T. p. hebridensis will frequent the seashore in winter.

== Behaviour and ecology ==
Breaking the shell of a snail

The song thrush is not usually gregarious, although several birds may roost together in winter or be loosely associated in suitable feeding habitats, perhaps with other thrushes such as the blackbird, fieldfare, redwing and dark-throated thrush. Unlike the more nomadic fieldfare and redwing, the song thrush tends to return regularly to the same wintering areas.

This is a monogamous territorial species, and in areas where it is fully migratory, the male re-establishes its breeding territory and starts singing as soon as he returns. In the milder areas where some birds stay year round, the resident male remains in his breeding territory, singing intermittently, but the female may establish a separate individual wintering range until pair formation begins in the early spring.

During migration, the song thrush travels mainly at night with a strong and direct flight action. It flies in loose flocks which cross the sea on a broad front rather than concentrating at short crossings (as occurs in the migration of large soaring birds), and calls frequently to maintain contact. Migration may start as early as late August in the most easterly and northerly parts of the range, but the majority of birds, with shorter distances to cover, head south from September to mid-December. However, hard weather may force further movement. Return migration varies between mid-February around the Mediterranean to May in northern Sweden and central Siberia.

=== Breeding and survival ===
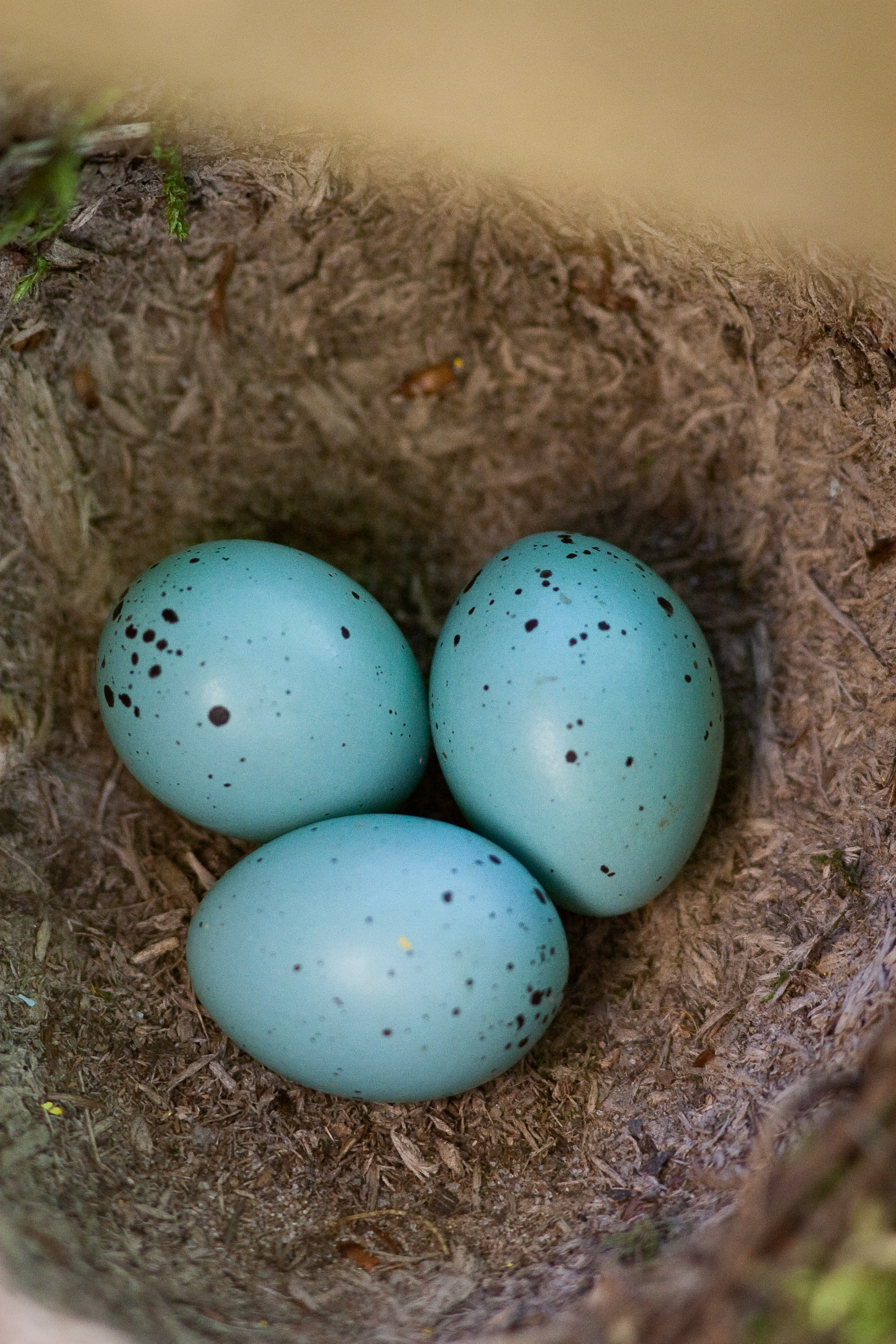
Three eggs in a nest

The female song thrush builds a neat cup-shaped nest lined with mud and dry grass in a bush, tree or creeper, or, in the case of the Hebridean subspecies, on the ground. She lays four or five bright glossy blue eggs which are lightly spotted with black or purple; they are typically 2.7 cm × 2.0 cm (1 1/8 in × 3/4 in) size and weigh 6.0 g (3/16 oz), of which 6% is shell. The female incubates the eggs alone for 10–17 days, and after hatching a similar time elapses until the young fledge. Two or three broods in a year is normal, although only one may be raised in the north of the range. On average, 54.6% of British juveniles survive the first year of life, and the adult annual survival rate is 62.2%. The typical lifespan is three years, but the maximum recorded age is 10 years 8 months. The song thrush is occasionally a host of parasitic cuckoos, such as the common cuckoo, but this is very rare because the thrush recognizes the cuckoo's non-mimetic eggs. However, the song thrush does not demonstrate the same aggression toward the adult cuckoo that is shown by the blackbird. The introduced birds in New Zealand, where the cuckoo does not occur, have, over the past 130 years, retained the ability to recognise and reject non-mimetic eggs.

Adult birds may be killed by cats, little owls and sparrowhawks, and eggs and nestlings are taken by magpies, jays, and, where present, grey squirrels. As with other passerine birds, parasites are common, and include endoparasites, such as the nematode Splendidofilaria (Avifilaria) mavis whose specific name mavis derives from this thrush. A Russian study of blood parasites showed that all the fieldfares, redwings and song thrushes sampled carried haematozoans, particularly Haemoproteus and Trypanosoma. Ixodes ticks are also common, and can carry pathogens, including tick-borne encephalitis in forested areas of central and eastern Europe and Russia, and, more widely, Borrelia bacteria. Some species of Borrelia cause Lyme disease, and ground-feeding birds like the song thrush may act as a reservoir for the disease.

=== Feeding ===
collecting food in Latvia

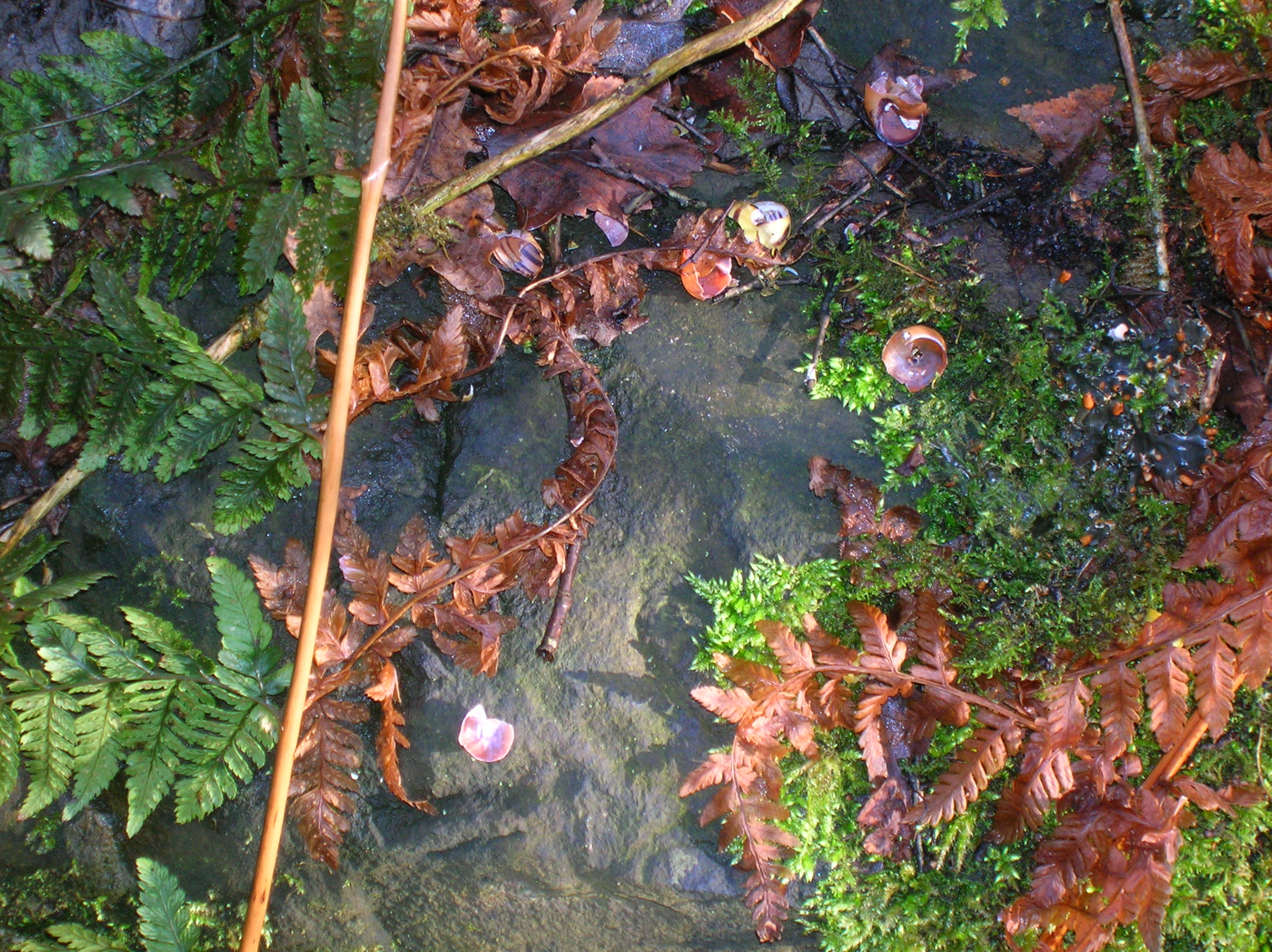
Broken shells of grove snails on an 'anvil'

Foraging in hedgerow (UK)

The song thrush is omnivorous, eating a wide range of invertebrates, especially earthworms and snails, as well as soft fruit and berries. Like its relative, the blackbird, the song thrush finds animal prey by sight, has a run-and-stop hunting technique on open ground, and will rummage through leaf-litter seeking potential food items.

Land snails are an especially important food item when drought or hard weather makes it hard to find other food. The thrush often uses a favorite stone as an "anvil" on which to break the shell of the snail before extracting the soft body and invariably wiping it on the ground before consumption. Young birds initially flick objects and attempt to play with them until they learn to use anvils as tools to smash snails. The nestlings are mainly fed on animal food such as worms, slugs, snails and insect larvae.

The grove snail (Cepaea nemoralis) is regularly eaten by the song thrush, and its polymorphic shell patterns have been suggested as evolutionary responses to reduce predation; however, song thrushes may not be the only selective force involved.

== Status and conservation ==
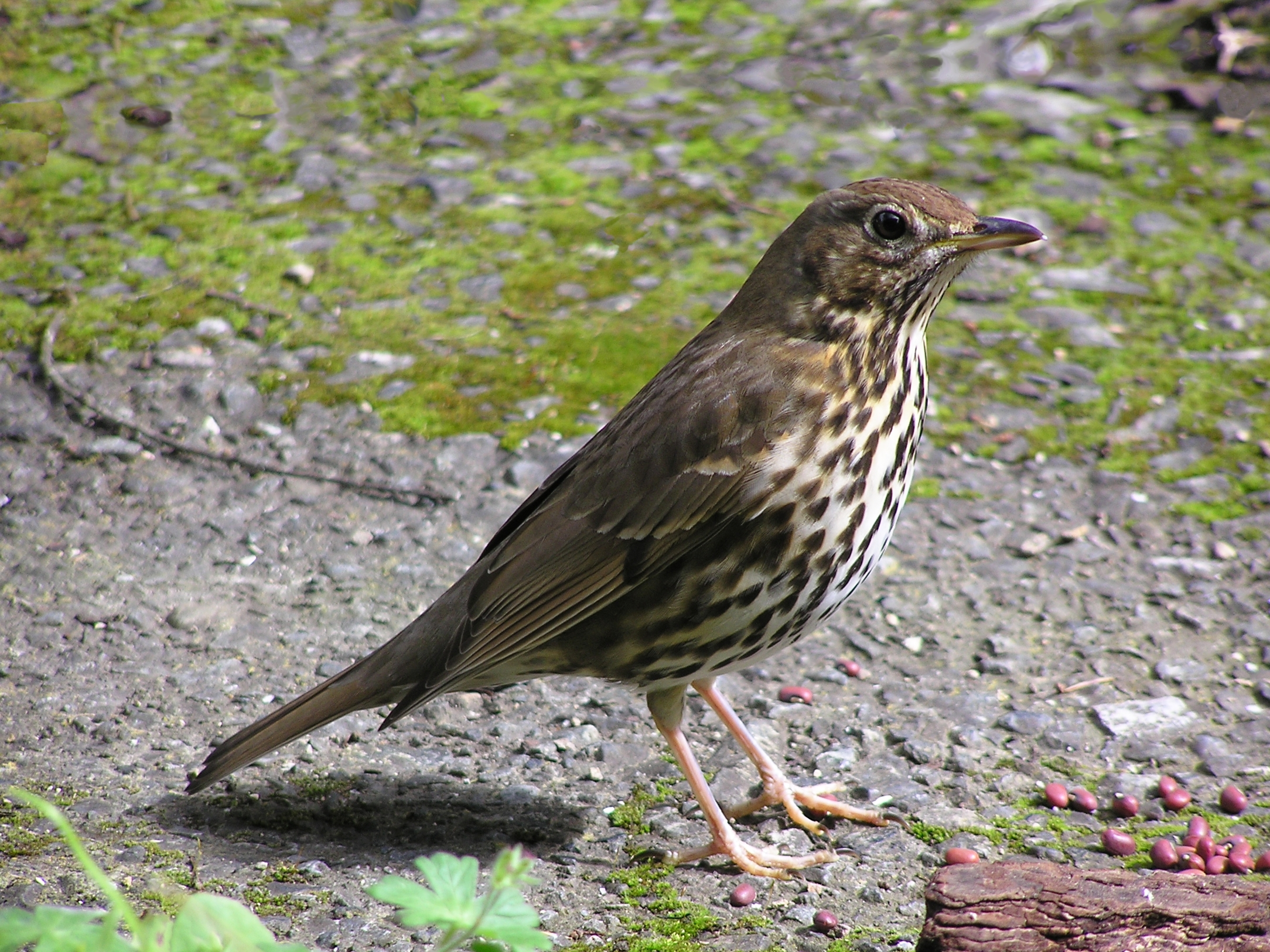
In New Zealand

The song thrush has an extensive range, estimated at 10 million square kilometres (4 million square miles), and a large population, with an estimated 40 to 71 million individuals in Europe alone.

In the western Palaearctic, there is evidence of population decline, but at a level below the threshold required for global conservation concern (i.e., a reduction in numbers of more than 30% in ten years or three generations) and the IUCN Red List categorises this species as of "Least Concern". In Great Britain and the Netherlands, there has been a more than 50% decline in population, and the song thrush is included in regional Red Lists. The decreases are greatest in farmlands (73% since the mid-1970s) and believed to be due to changes in agricultural practices in recent decades. The precise reasons for the decline are not known but may be related to the loss of hedgerows, a move to sowing crops in autumn rather than spring, and possibly the increased use of pesticides. These changes may have reduced the availability of food and of nest sites. In gardens, the use of poison bait to control slugs and snails may pose a threat. In urban areas, some thrushes are killed while using the hard surface of roads to smash snails.

== Relationship with humans ==
The song thrush's characteristic song, with melodic phrases repeated twice or more, is described by the nineteenth-century British poet Robert Browning in his 1845 poem "Home Thoughts, from Abroad":

That's the wise thrush; he sings each song twice over,
Lest you should think he never could recapture
The first fine careless rapture!

The song also inspired the nineteenth-century British writer Thomas Hardy, who spoke in Darkling Thrush of the bird's "full-hearted song evensong/Of joy illimited", but twentieth-century British poet Ted Hughes in Thrushes concentrated on its hunting prowess: "Nothing but bounce and/stab/and a ravening second". Nineteenth-century Welsh poet Edward Thomas wrote 15 poems concerning blackbirds or thrushes, including The Thrush:

I hear the thrush, and I see
Him alone at the end of the lane
Near the bare poplar's tip,
Singing continuously.

Dunfermline, Scotland

In The Tables Turned, Romantic poet William Wordsworth references the song thrush, writing

Hark, how blithe the throstle sings
And he is no mean preacher
Come forth into the light of things
Let Nature be your teacher

The song thrush is the emblem of West Bromwich Albion Football Club, chosen because the public house in which the team used to change kept a pet thrush in a cage. It also gave rise to Albion's early nickname, The Throstles. A few English pubs and hotels share the name Throstles Nest.

=== As food ===
Thrushes have been trapped for food from as far back as 12,000 years ago and an early reference is found in the Odyssey: "Then, as doves or thrushes beating their spread wings against some snare rigged up in thickets—flying in for a cosy nest but a grisly bed receives them." Hunting continues today around the Mediterranean, but is not believed to be a major factor in this species' decline in parts of its range.

In Spain, this species is normally caught as it migrates through the country, often using birdlime which, although banned by the European Union, is still tolerated and permitted in the Valencian Community. In 2003 and 2004 the EU tried, but failed, to stop this practice in the Valencian region.

=== As pets ===
Up to at least the nineteenth century the song thrush was kept as a cage bird because of its melodious voice. As with hunting, there is little evidence that the taking of wild birds for aviculture has had a significant effect on wild populations.
