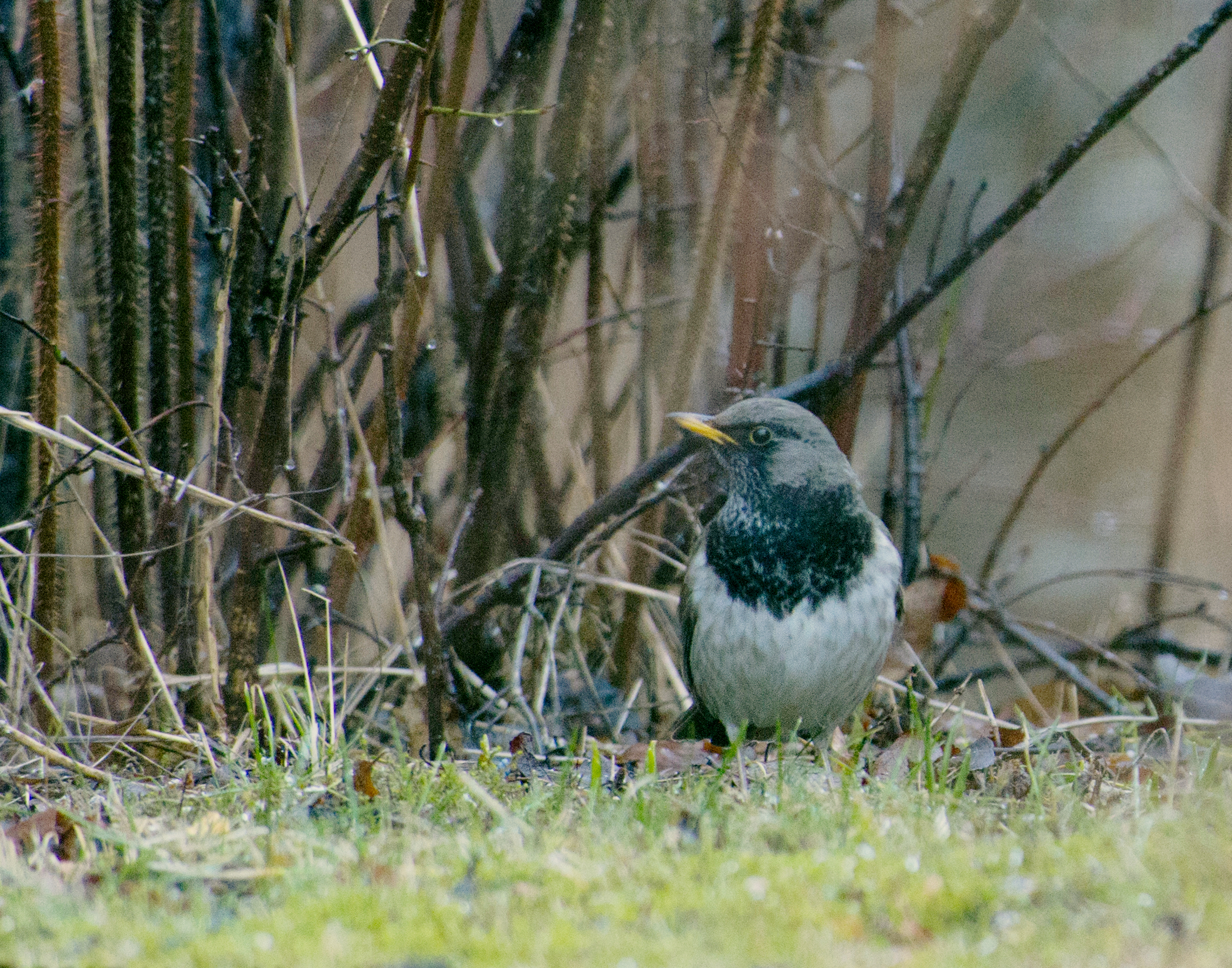

Conservation status
- Least Concern (IUCN 3.1)

Scientific classification
- Kingdom: Animalia
- Phylum: Chordata
- Class: Aves
- Order: Passeriformes
- Family: Turdidae
- Genus: Turdus
- Species: T. atrogularis

Binomial name
- Turdus atrogularis Jarocki, 1819

= Black-throated thrush =

Species of bird

The black-throated thrush (Turdus atrogularis) is a passerine bird in the thrush family. It is sometimes regarded as one subspecies of a polytypic species, "dark-throated thrush", red-throated thrush then being the other subspecies. More recent treatments regard the two as separate species.

The black-throated thrush is a migratory Eastern Palearctic species. Its range overlaps with the more easterly-breeding red-throated thrush.

== Description ==
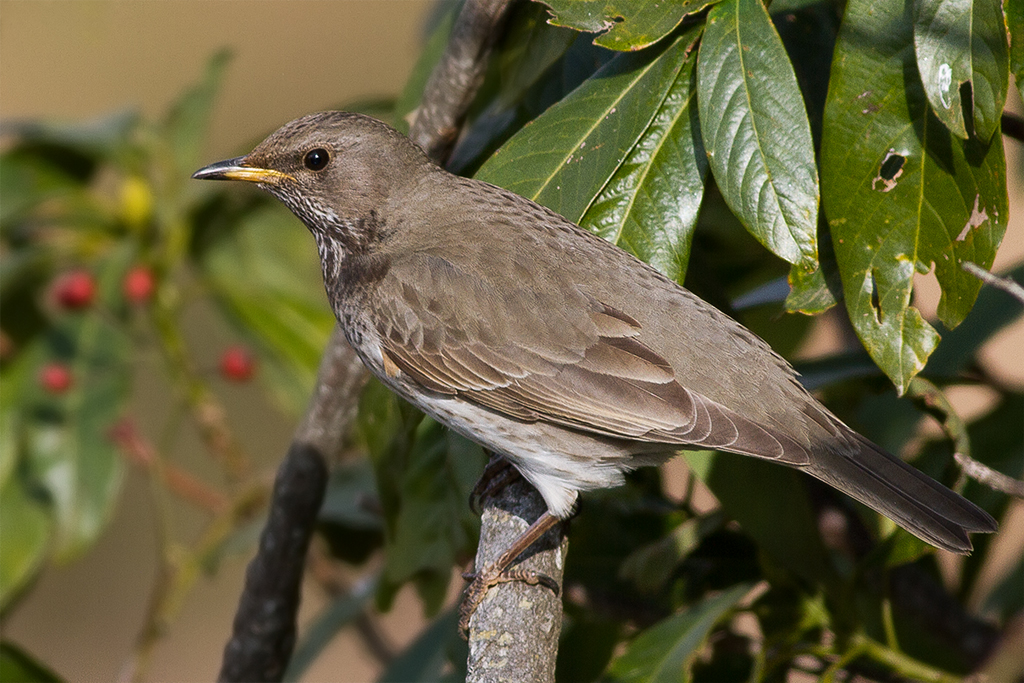
Female in Uttarakhand, India

This is a large and distinctive thrush. The male has black from the chin to the breast with a greyish black tail. The upperparts are grey and the underparts are whitish with orange-red underwing coverts. Females and immatures are similar but the black on the throat and breast is replaced with dusky streaking.

== Habitat ==
Black-throated thrushes breed along the edges of clearings in coniferous or mixed deciduous forest, often in the undergrowth of Siberian Pine Pinus sibirica or mixed spruce fir forest, especially along watercourses or in swampy areas.

== Ecology ==
Black-throated thrushes breed solitarily or in loose aggregations of pairs in late May through to late July. The nest is made of grasses and thin twigs bound with earth and lined with fine grasses, moss or lichens. The nest is usually placed within 1.5 to 2m of the ground, sometimes on the ground. Otherwise, their behaviour is similar to that of the fieldfare T. pilaris. In winter, these thrushes are often found in large flocks with other thrushes such as Tickell's thrush T. unicolor, eye-browed thrush T. obscurus and mistle thrush T. viscivorus, on migration often with dusky thrush. Black-throated thrushes roost in dense evergreen vegetation. They typically feed on the ground. Their diet usually include invertebrates; they also feed on various berries, cherries and some seeds.

== Distribution ==
The breeding range of the black-throated thrush extends from the extreme east of Europe to Western Siberia and north-west Mongolia. The wintering range extends from the Middle East, although uncommon in the Arabian Peninsula to eastern Myanmar. As a vagrant, it has occurred in Japan, Thailand, and Taiwan. It may also be occasionally found in most of Europe west of its normal range.

== Taxonomy ==
The scientific name comes from Latin. Turdus is "thrush" and the specific atrogularis is derived from ater, "black", and gula, "throat". Formerly considered conspecific with the red-throated thrush T. ruficollis but now considered a separate species.
