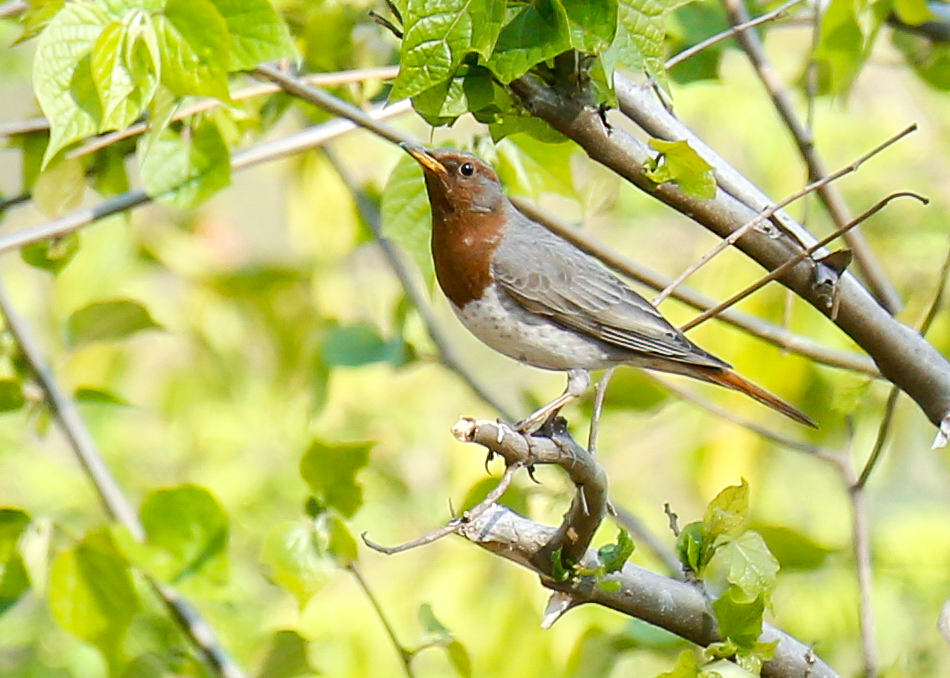
- Red-throated thrush, Nepal

Conservation status
- Least Concern (IUCN 3.1)

Scientific classification
- Kingdom: Animalia
- Phylum: Chordata
- Class: Aves
- Order: Passeriformes
- Family: Turdidae
- Genus: Turdus
- Species: T. ruficollis

Binomial name
- Turdus ruficollis Pallas, 1776

= Red-throated thrush =

Species of bird

The red-throated thrush (Turdus ruficollis) is a passerine bird in the thrush family. It is sometimes regarded as one subspecies of a polytypic species, "dark-throated thrush", black-throated thrush then being the other subspecies. More recent treatments regard the two as separate species. The scientific name comes from Latin. Turdus is "thrush" and the specific ruficollis is derived from rufus, "red", and collum, "neck".

The red-throated thrush is a migratory Palearctic species. It breeds in East Siberia to North Manchuria wintering to West China, Myanmar, and Northeast India. Its range overlaps with the more westerly-breeding black-throated thrush. It is a large thrush with a plain grey back and reddish underwings. The adult male has a red throat. Females and young birds lack the bib, but have black-streaked underparts. This bird species is a very rare vagrant to western Europe.
