= List of birds of the Azores =

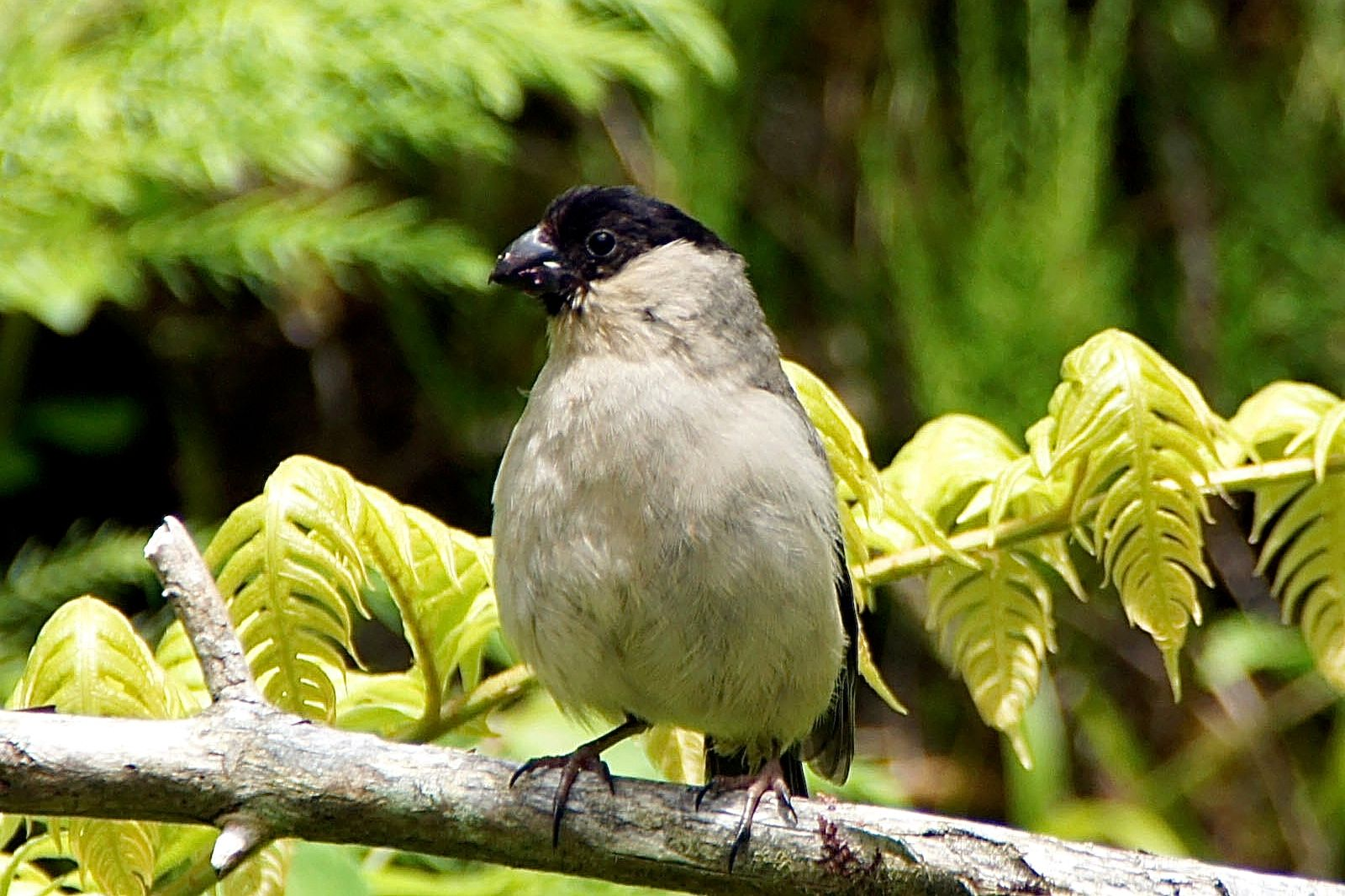
The Azores bullfinch is endemic to the Azores.

This is a list of the bird species recorded in the Azores. The avifauna of the Azores include a total of 430 species, of which two are endemic, and 7 have been introduced by humans.

This list's taxonomic treatment (designation and sequence of orders, families and species) and nomenclature (common and scientific names) follow the conventions of The Clements Checklist of Birds of the World, 2022 edition. The family accounts at the beginning of each heading reflect this taxonomy, as do the species counts found in each family account. Introduced and accidental species are included in the total counts for the Azores.

The following tags have been used to highlight several categories. The commonly occurring native species do not fall into any of these categories.

- (A) Accidental - a species that rarely or accidentally occurs in the Azores
- (E) Endemic - a species endemic to the Azores
- (I) Introduced - a species introduced to the Azores as a consequence, direct or indirect, of human actions

== Ducks, geese, and waterfowl ==
Order: Anseriformes Family: Anatidae

Anatidae includes the ducks and most duck-like waterfowl, such as geese and swans. These birds are adapted to an aquatic existence with webbed feet, flattened bills, and feathers that are excellent at shedding water due to an oily coating.

- Fulvous whistling-duck, Dendrocygna bicolor (A)
- Snow goose, Anser caerulescens (A)
- Graylag goose, Anser anser (A)
- Greater white-fronted goose, Anser albifrons (A)
- Taiga bean-goose, Anser fabalis (A)
- Pink-footed goose, Anser brachyrhynchus (A)
- Brant, Branta bernicla (A)
- Barnacle goose, Branta leucopsis (A)
- Cackling goose, Branta hutchinsii (A)
- Canada goose, Branta canadensis (A)
- Mute swan, Cygnus olor (A)
- Whooper swan, Cygnus cygnus (A)
- Ruddy shelduck, Tadorna ferruginea (A)
- Common shelduck, Tadorna tadorna (A)
- Wood duck, Aix sponsa (A)
- Garganey, Spatula querquedula (A)
- Blue-winged teal, Spatula discors (A)
- Northern shoveler, Spatula clypeata (A)
- Gadwall, Mareca strepera
- Eurasian wigeon, Mareca penelope
- American wigeon, Mareca americana (A)
- Mallard, Anas platyrhynchos
- American black duck, Aix rubripes
- Northern pintail, Anas acuta (A)
- Green-winged teal, Anas crecca
- Red-crested pochard, Netta rufina (A)
- Redhead, Aythya americana (A)
- Common pochard, Aythya ferina (A)
- Ring-necked duck, Aythya collaris
- Ferruginous duck, Aythya nyroca (A)
- Tufted duck, Aythya fuligula
- Greater scaup, Aythya marila (A)
- Lesser scaup, Aythya affinis (A)
- King eider, Somateria spectabilis (A)
- Common eider, Somateria mollissima (A)
- Surf scoter, Melanitta perspicillata (A)
- White-winged scoter, Melanitta deglandi (A)
- Common scoter, Melanitta nigra (A)
- Long-tailed duck, Clangula hyemalis (A)
- Bufflehead, Bucephala albeola (A)
- Common goldeneye, Bucephala clangula (A)
- Hooded merganser, Lophodytes cucullatus (A)
- Common merganser, Mergus merganser (A)
- Red-breasted merganser, Mergus serrator (A)
- Ruddy duck, Oxyura jamaicensis (A)

== Pheasants, grouse, and allies ==
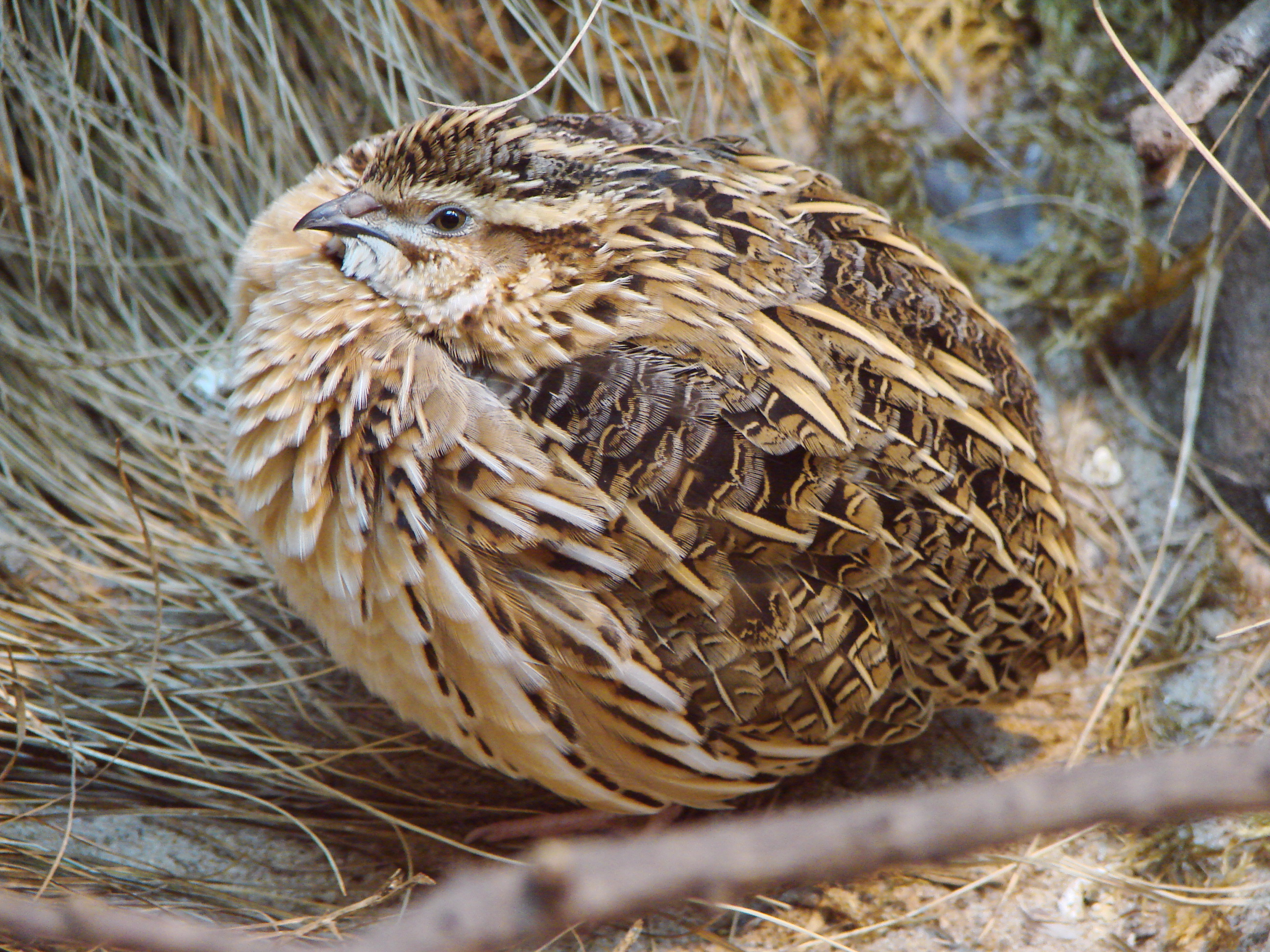
Common quail

Order: Galliformes Family: Phasianidae

The Phasianidae are a family of terrestrial birds which consists of quails, partridges, snowcocks, francolins, spurfowls, tragopans, monals, pheasants, peafowls and jungle fowls. In general, they are plump (although they vary in size) and have broad, relatively short wings.

- Ring-necked pheasant, Phasianus colchicus (I)
- Common quail, Coturnix coturnix
- Red-legged partridge, Alectoris rufa (I)

== Flamingos ==
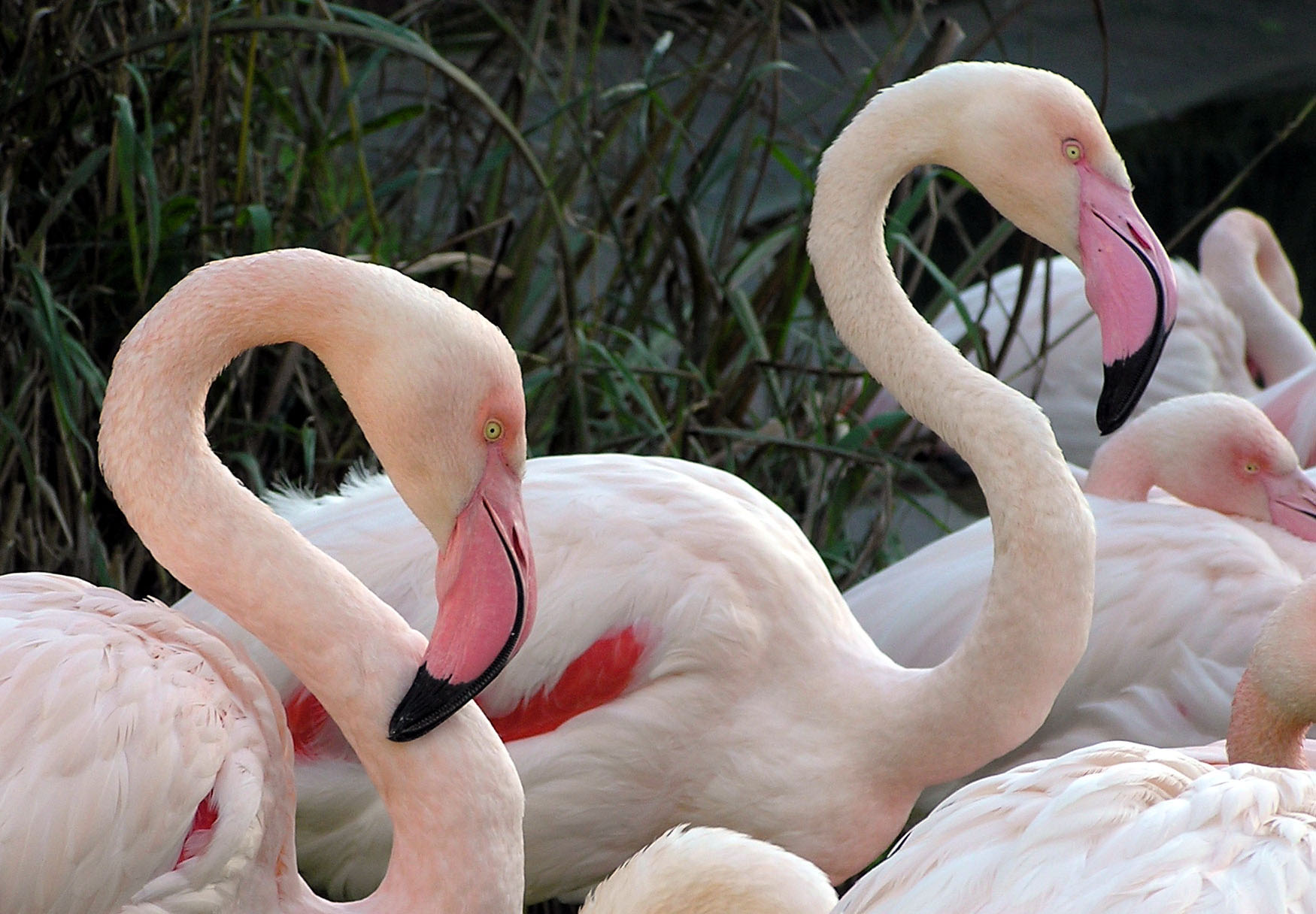
Greater flamingo

Order: Phoenicopteriformes Family: Phoenicopteridae

Flamingos are gregarious wading birds, usually 3 to 5 feet (0.9 to 1.5 m) tall, found in both the Western and Eastern Hemispheres. Flamingos filter-feed on shellfish and algae. Their oddly shaped beaks are specially adapted to separate mud and silt from the food they consume and, uniquely, are used upside-down.

- Greater flamingo, Phoenicopterus roseus (A)

== Grebes ==
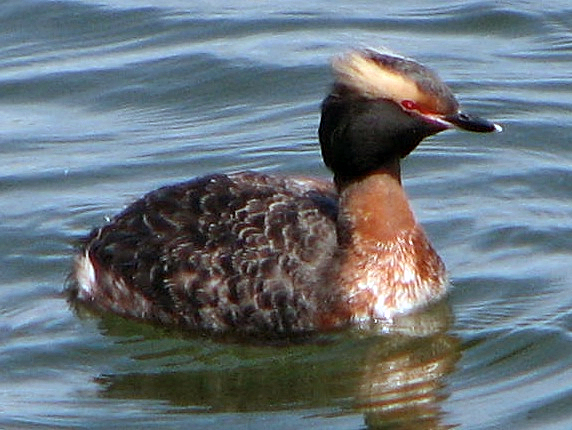
Horned grebe

Order: Podicipediformes Family: Podicipedidae

Grebes are small to medium-large freshwater diving birds. They have lobed toes and are excellent swimmers and divers. However, they have their feet placed far back on the body, making them quite ungainly on land.

- Little grebe, Tachybaptus ruficollis (A)
- Pied-billed grebe, Podilymbus podiceps (A)
- Horned grebe, Podiceps auritus (A)
- Red-necked grebe, Podiceps grisegena (A)
- Great crested grebe, Podiceps cristatus (A)
- Eared grebe, Podiceps nigricollis (A)

== Pigeons and doves ==
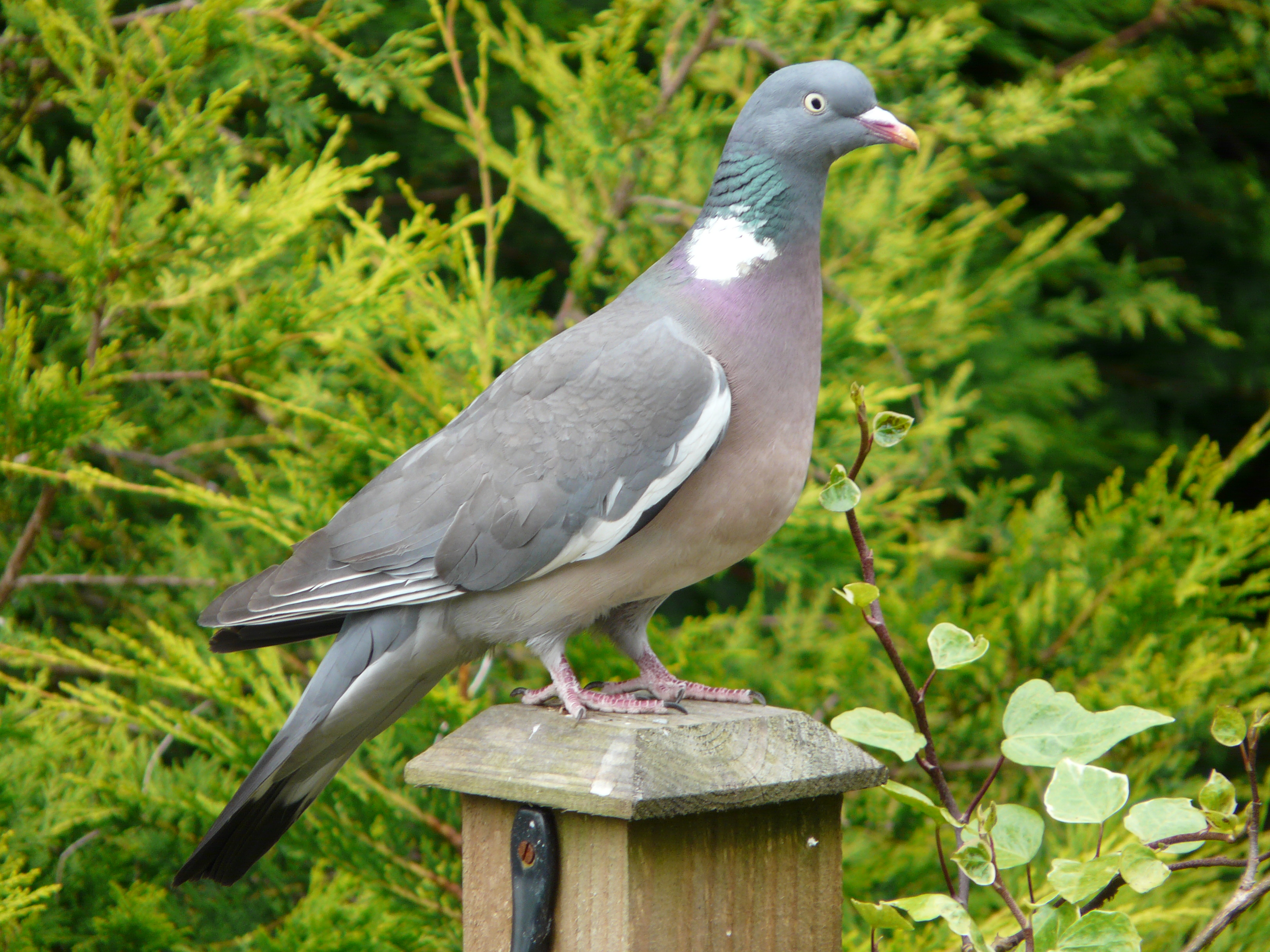
Common wood-pigeon

Order: Columbiformes Family: Columbidae

Pigeons and doves are stout-bodied birds with short necks and short slender bills with a fleshy cere.

- Azores wood pigeon Columba palumbus azorica (subspecies of the common wood pigeon, Columba palumbus)
- Rock pigeon, Columba livia
- European turtle-dove, Streptopelia turtur (A)
- Eurasian collared-dove, Streptopelia decaocto
- Zenaida dove, Zenaida aurita (A)
- Mourning dove, Zenaida macroura (A)

== Cuckoos ==
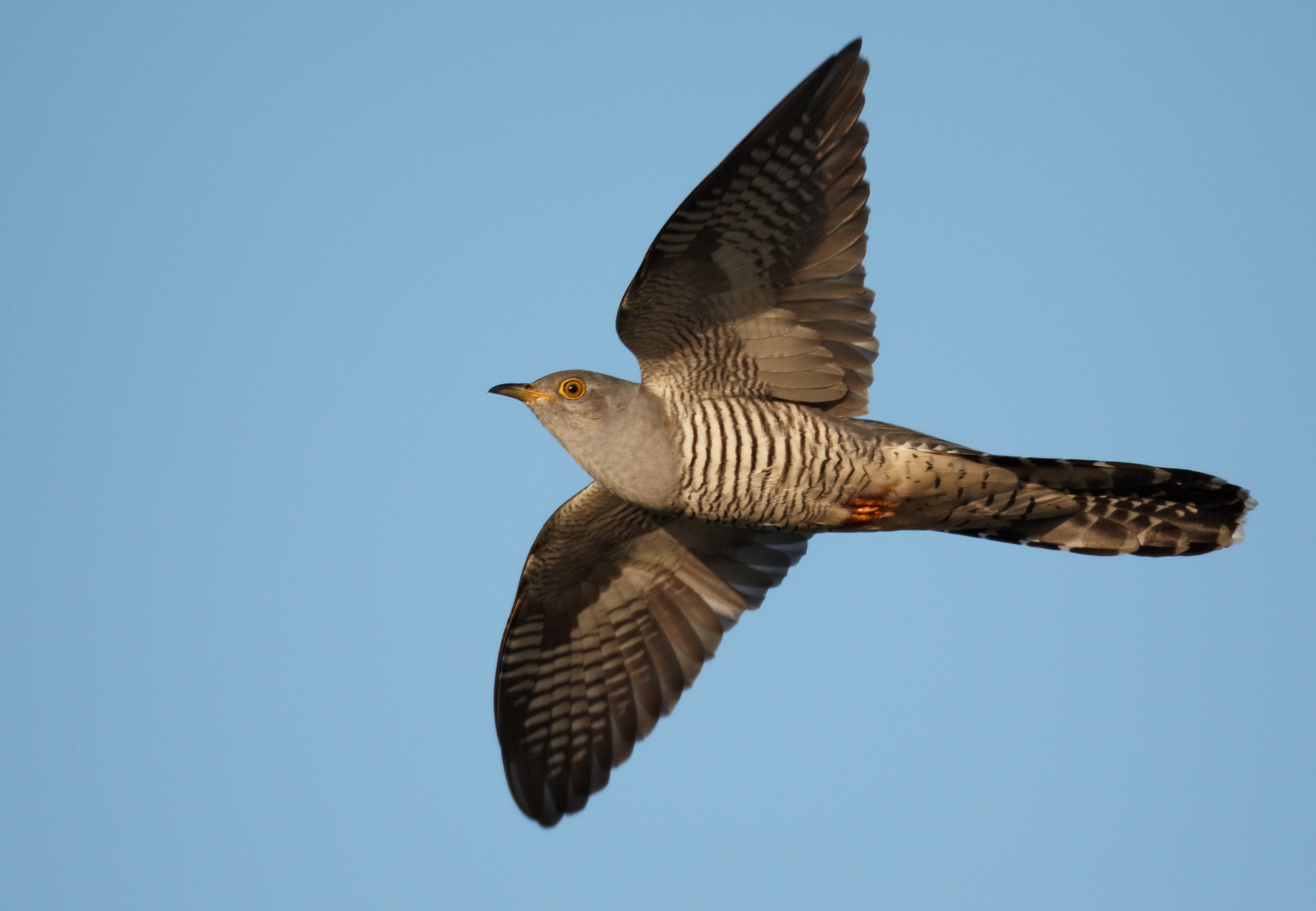
Common cuckoo

Order: Cuculiformes Family: Cuculidae

The family Cuculidae includes cuckoos, roadrunners and anis. These birds are of variable size with slender bodies, long tails and strong legs. The Old World cuckoos are brood parasites.

- Great spotted cuckoo, Clamator glandarius (A)
- Yellow-billed cuckoo, Coccyzus americanus (A)
- Black-billed cuckoo, Coccyzus erythropthalmus (A)
- Common cuckoo, Cuculus canorus (A)

== Nightjars and allies ==
Order: Caprimulgiformes Family: Caprimulgidae

Nightjars are medium-sized nocturnal birds that usually nest on the ground. They have long wings, short legs and very short bills. Most have small feet, of little use for walking, and long pointed wings. Their soft plumage is camouflaged to resemble bark or leaves.

- Common nighthawk, Chordeiles minor (A)
- Eurasian nightjar, Caprimulgus europaeus (A)

== Swifts ==
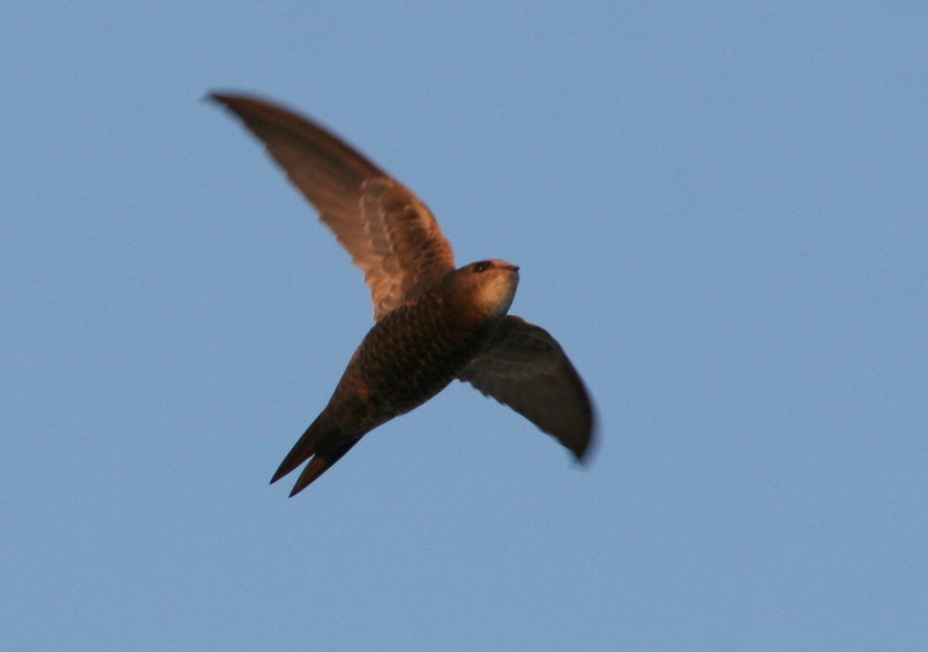
Pallid swift

Order: Caprimulgiformes Family: Apodidae

Swifts are small birds which spend the majority of their lives flying. These birds have very short legs and never settle voluntarily on the ground, perching instead only on vertical surfaces. Many swifts have long swept-back wings which resemble a crescent or boomerang.

- Chimney swift, Chaetura pelagica (A)
- Alpine swift, Apus melba (A)
- Common swift, Apus apus (A)
- Pallid swift, Apus pallidus (A)
- Little swift, Apus affinis (A)

== Rails, gallinules, and coots ==
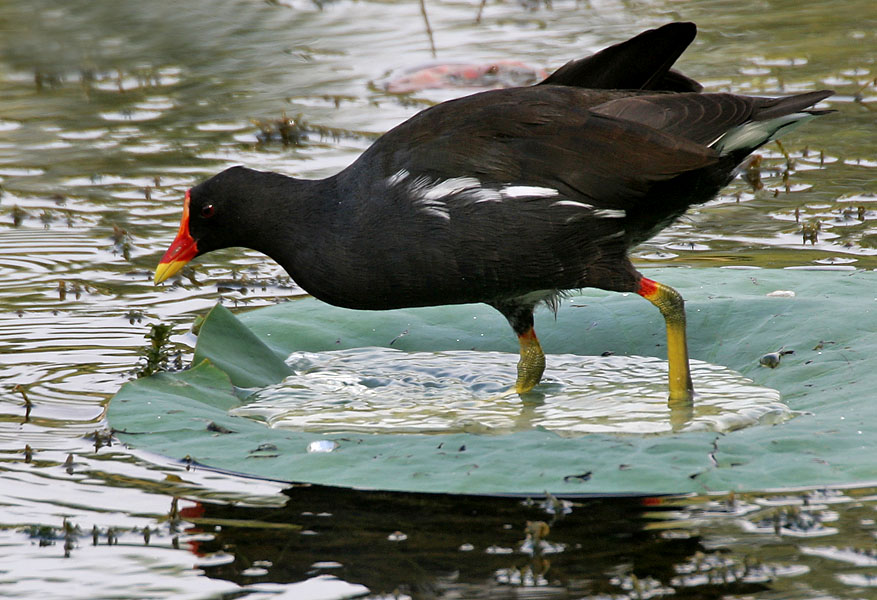
Eurasian moorhen

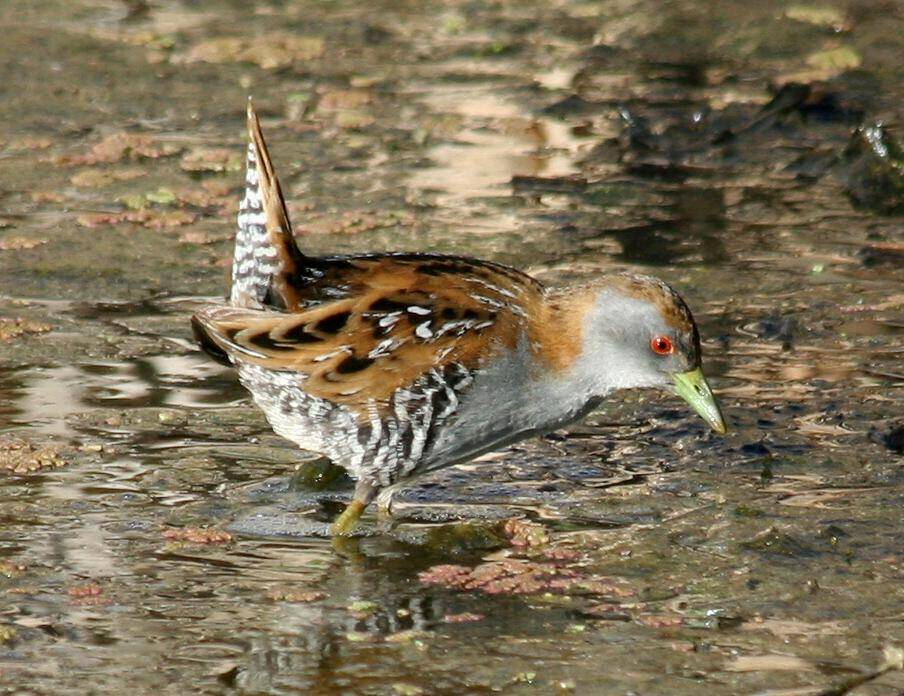
Baillon's crake

Order: Gruiformes Family: Rallidae

Rallidae is a large family of small to medium-sized birds which includes the rails, crakes, coots and gallinules. Typically they inhabit dense vegetation in damp environments near lakes, swamps or rivers. In general they are shy and secretive birds, making them difficult to observe. Most species have strong legs and long toes which are well adapted to soft uneven surfaces. They tend to have short, rounded wings and to be weak fliers.

- Water rail, Rallus aquaticus (A)
- Corn crake, Crex crex (A)
- Sora, Porzana carolina (A)
- Spotted crake, Porzana porzana (A)
- Eurasian moorhen, Gallinula chloropus
- Eurasian coot, Fulica atra
- American coot, Fulica americana (A)
- Allen's gallinule, Porphyrio alleni (A)
- Purple gallinule, Porphyrio martinicus (A)
- Western swamphen, Porphyrio porphyrio (A)
- Little crake, Zapornia parva (A)
- Baillon's crake, Zapornia pusilla

== Cranes ==
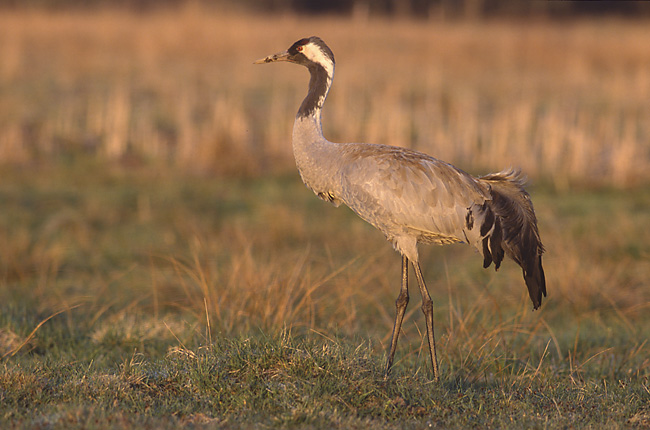
Common crane

Order: Gruiformes Family: Gruidae

Cranes (Gruidae) are large, long-legged and long-necked birds. Unlike the similar-looking but unrelated herons, cranes fly with necks outstretched, not pulled back. Most have elaborate and noisy courting displays or "dances".

- Sandhill crane, Antigone canadensis (A)
- Common crane, Grus grus (A)

== Thick-knees ==
Order: Charadriiformes Family: Burhinidae

The thick-knees (Burhinidae) are a group of largely tropical waders in the family Burhinidae. They are found worldwide within the tropical zone, with some species also breeding in temperate Europe and Australia. They are medium to large waders with strong black or yellow-black bills, large yellow eyes and cryptic plumage. Despite being classed as waders, most species have a preference for arid or semi-arid habitats.

- Eurasian thick-knee, Burhinus oedicnemus (A)

== Stilts and avocets ==
Order: Charadriiformes Family: Recurvirostridae

Recurvirostridae is a family of large wading birds, which includes the avocets and stilts. The avocets have long legs and long up-curved bills. The stilts have extremely long legs and long, thin, straight bills.

- Black-winged stilt, Himantopus himantopus (A)
- Pied avocet, Recurvirostra avosetta (A)

== Oystercatchers ==
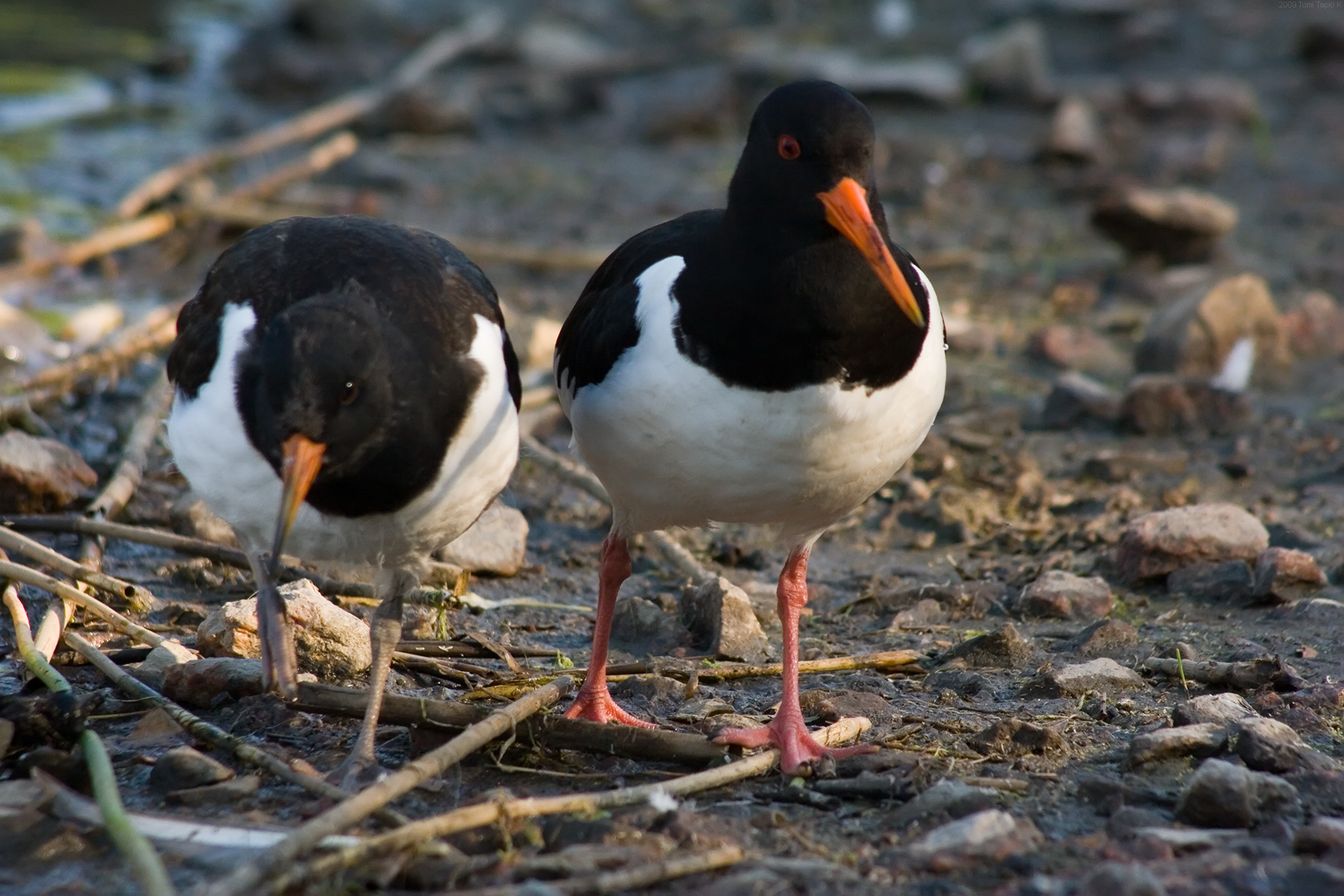
Eurasian oystercatcher

Order: Charadriiformes Family: Haematopodidae

The oystercatchers (Haematopodidae) are large and noisy plover-like birds, with strong bills used for smashing or prising open molluscs.

- Eurasian oystercatcher, Haematopus ostralegus (A)

== Plovers and lapwings ==
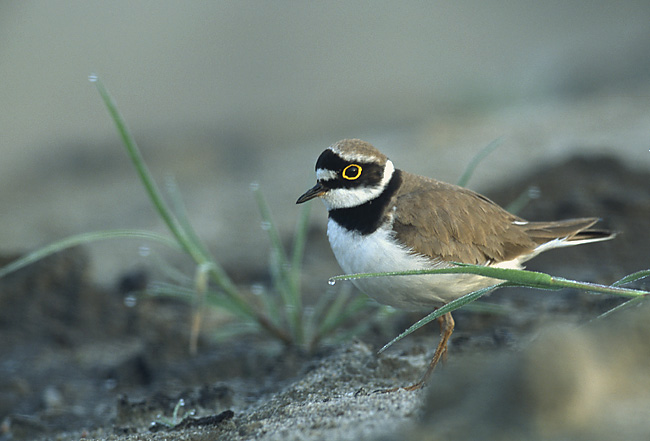
Little ringed plover

Order: Charadriiformes Family: Charadriidae

The family Charadriidae includes the plovers, dotterels and lapwings. They are small to medium-sized birds with compact bodies, short, thick necks and long, usually pointed, wings. They are found in open country worldwide, mostly in habitats near water.

- Black-bellied plover, Pluvialis squatarola (A)
- European golden-plover, Pluvialis apricaria (A)
- American golden-plover, Pluvialis dominica (A)
- Pacific golden-plover, Pluvialis fulva (A)
- Northern lapwing, Vanellus vanellus
- Caspian plover, Charadrius asiaticus (A)
- Kentish plover, Charadrius alexandrinus
- Common ringed plover, Charadrius hiaticula
- Semipalmated plover, Charadrius semipalmatus
- Little ringed plover, Charadrius dubius (A)
- Killdeer, Charadrius vociferus (A)
- Eurasian dotterel, Charadrius morinellus (A)

== Sandpipers and allies ==
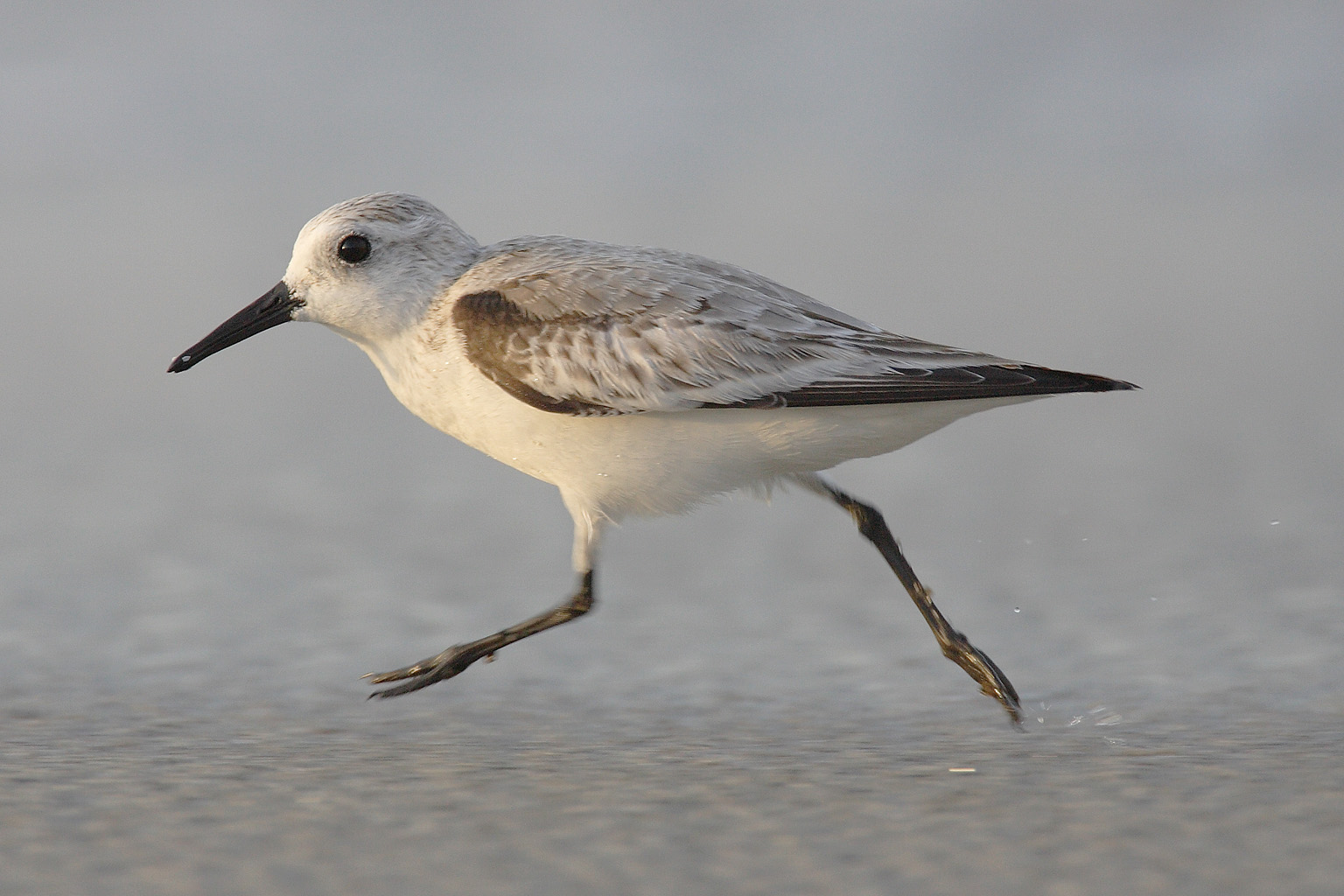
Sanderling

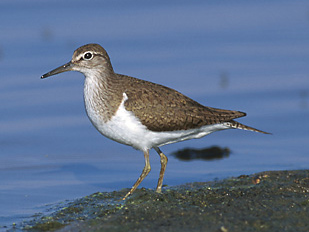
Common sandpiper

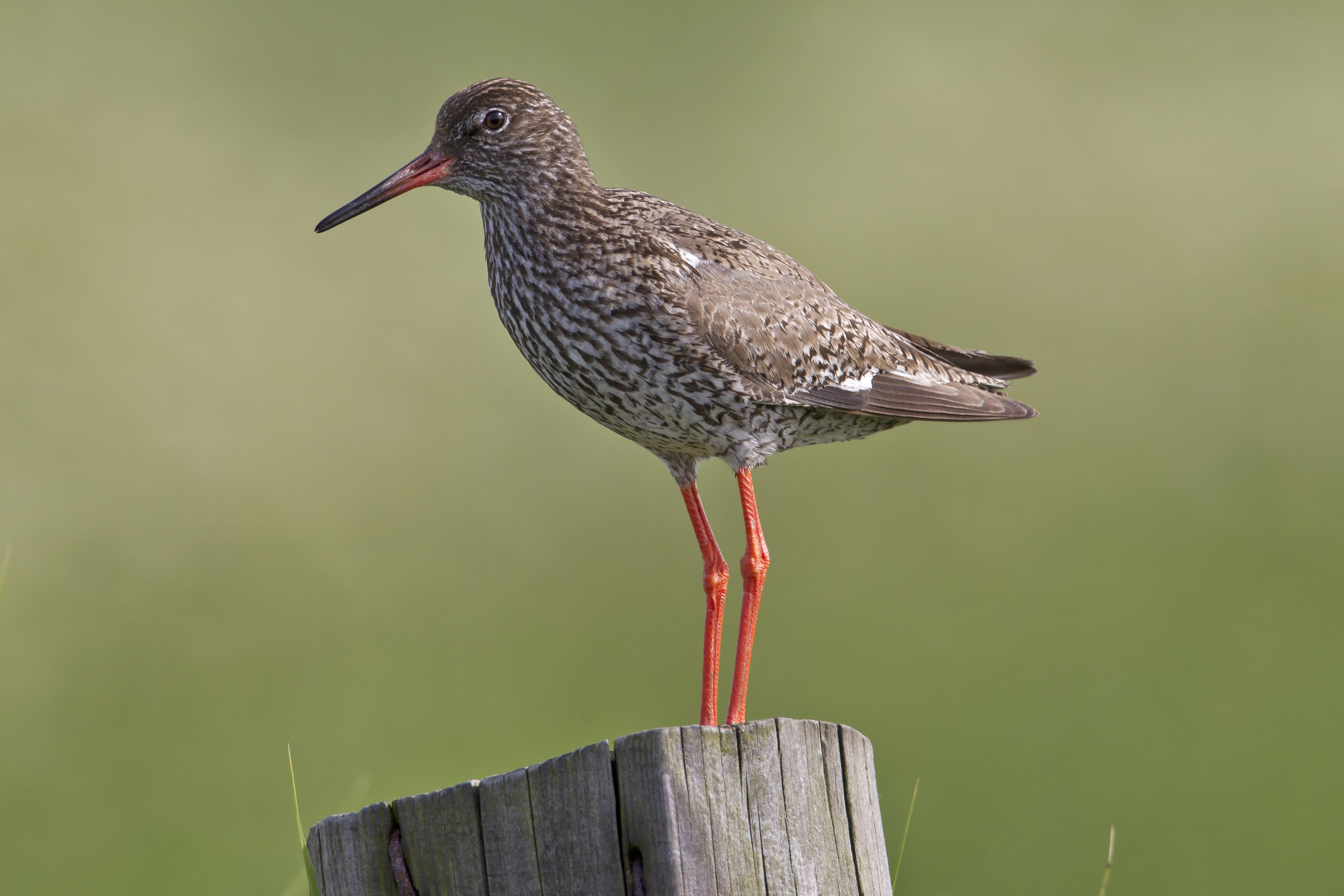
Common redshank

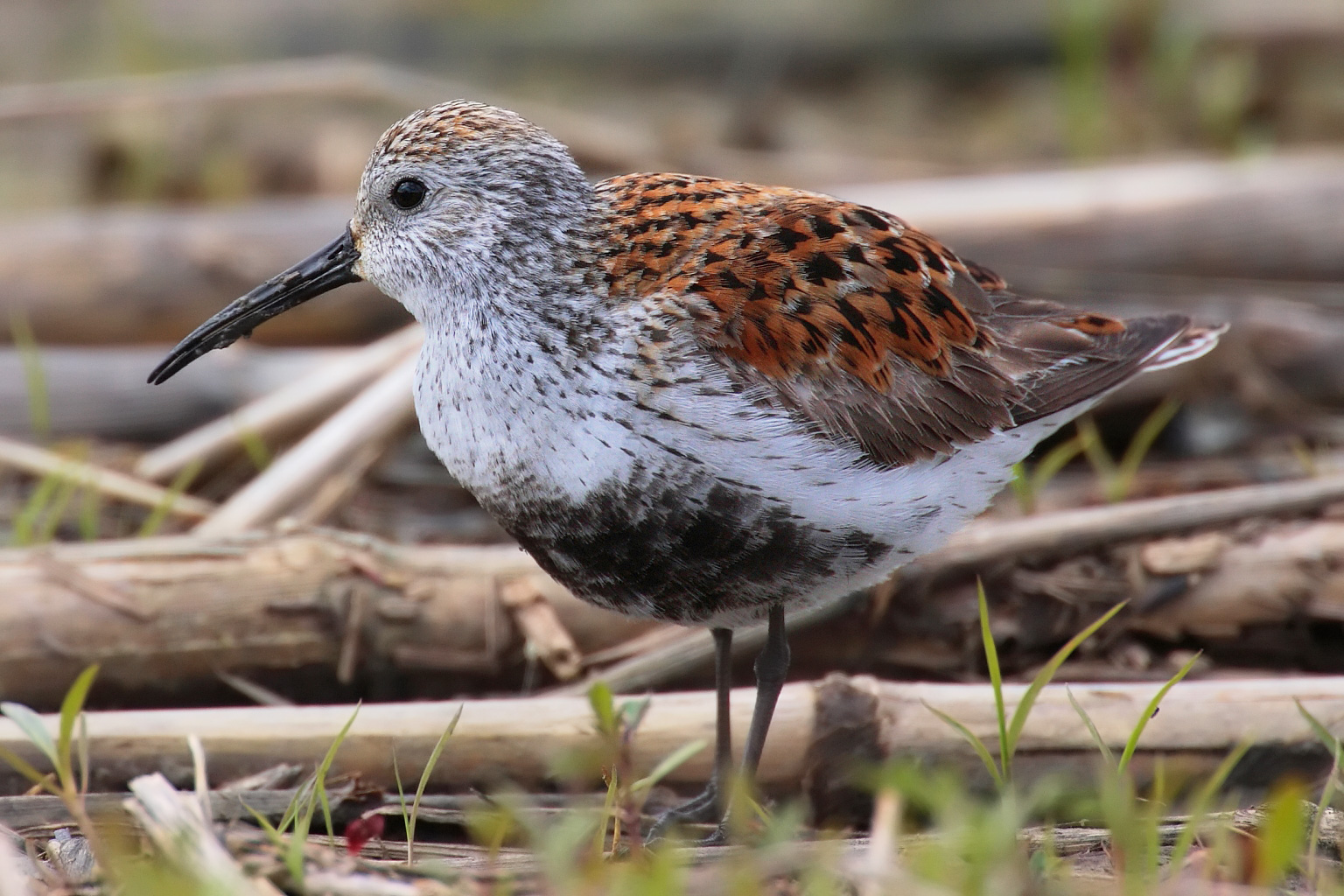
Dunlin

Order: Charadriiformes Family: Scolopacidae

Scolopacidae is a large diverse family of small to medium-sized shorebirds including the sandpipers, curlews, godwits, shanks, tattlers, woodcocks, snipes, dowitchers and phalaropes. The majority of these species eat small invertebrates picked out of the mud or soil. Variation in length of legs and bills enables multiple species to feed in the same habitat, particularly on the coast, without direct competition for food.

- Upland sandpiper, Bartramia longicauda (A)
- Whimbrel, Numenius phaeopus
- Slender-billed curlew, Numenius tenuirostris (A)
- Eurasian curlew, Numenius arquata (A)
- Bar-tailed godwit, Limosa lapponica (A)
- Black-tailed godwit, Limosa limosa
- Ruddy turnstone, Arenaria interpres
- Red knot, Calidris canutus
- Ruff, Calidris pugnax (A)
- Sharp-tailed sandpiper, Calidris acuminata (A)
- Stilt sandpiper, Calidris himantopus (A)
- Curlew sandpiper, Calidris ferruginea
- Temminck's stint, Calidris temminckii (A)
- Sanderling, Calidris alba
- Dunlin, Calidris alpina
- Purple sandpiper, Calidris maritima (A)
- Baird's sandpiper, Calidris bairdii (A)
- Little stint, Calidris minuta
- Least sandpiper, Calidris minutilla (A)
- White-rumped sandpiper, Calidris fuscicollis
- Pectoral sandpiper, Calidris melanotos (A)
- Buff-breasted sandpiper, Calidris subruficollis (A)
- Pectoral sandpiper, Calidris melanotos
- Semipalmated sandpiper, Calidris pusilla
- Western sandpiper, Calidris mauri (A)
- Short-billed dowitcher, Limnodromus griseus (A)
- Long-billed dowitcher, Limnodromus scolopaceus (A)
- Jack snipe, Lymnocryptes minimus (A)
- Eurasian woodcock, Scolopax rusticola
- Great snipe, Gallinago media (A)
- Common snipe, Gallinago gallinago
- Wilson's snipe, Gallinago delicata
- Terek sandpiper, Xenus cinereus (A)
- Wilson's phalarope, Phalaropus tricolor (A)
- Red-necked phalarope, Phalaropus lobatus (A)
- Red phalarope, Phalaropus fulicarius
- Common sandpiper, Actitis hypoleucos
- Spotted sandpiper, Actitis macularius (A)
- Green sandpiper, Tringa ochropus (A)
- Solitary sandpiper, Tringa solitaria (A)
- Grey-tailed tattler, Tringa brevipes (A)
- Spotted redshank, Tringa erythropus
- Greater yellowlegs, Tringa melanoleuca (A)
- Common greenshank, Tringa nebularia
- Willet, Tringa semipalmata (A)
- Lesser yellowlegs, Tringa flavipes
- Marsh sandpiper, Tringa stagnatilis (A)
- Wood sandpiper, Tringa glareola (A)
- Common redshank, Tringa totanus (A)

== Pratincoles and coursers ==
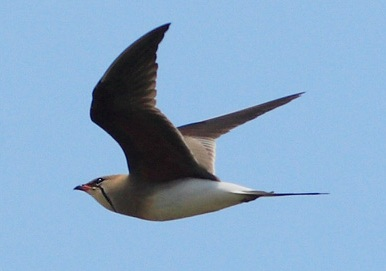
Collared pratincole

Order: Charadriiformes Family: Glareolidae

Glareolidae is a family of wading birds comprising the pratincoles, which have short legs, long pointed wings and long forked tails, and the coursers, which have long legs, short wings and long, pointed bills which curve downwards.

- Cream-colored courser, Cursorius cursor (A)

== Skuas and jaegers ==
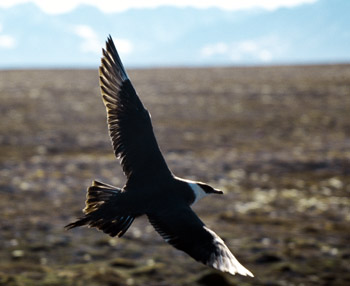
Parasitic jaeger

Order: Charadriiformes Family: Stercorariidae

The family Stercorariidae are, in general, medium to large sea birds, typically with grey or brown plumage, often with white markings on the wings. They nest on the ground in temperate and arctic regions and are long-distance migrants.

- Great skua, Stercorarius skua
- South polar skua, Stercorarius maccormicki (A)
- Pomarine jaeger, Stercorarius pomarinus
- Parasitic jaeger, Stercorarius parasiticus
- Long-tailed jaeger, Stercorarius longicaudus

== Auks, murres, and puffins ==
Order: Charadriiformes Family: Alcidae

Auks (Alcidae) are a family of seabirds which are superficially similar to penguins with their black-and-white colours, their upright posture and some of their habits but which are able to fly.

- Dovekie, Alle alle (A)
- Thick-billed murre, Uria lomvia (A)
- Razorbill, Alca torda (A)
- Atlantic puffin, Fratercula arctica (A)

== Gulls, terns, and skimmers ==
Order: Charadriiformes Family: Laridae

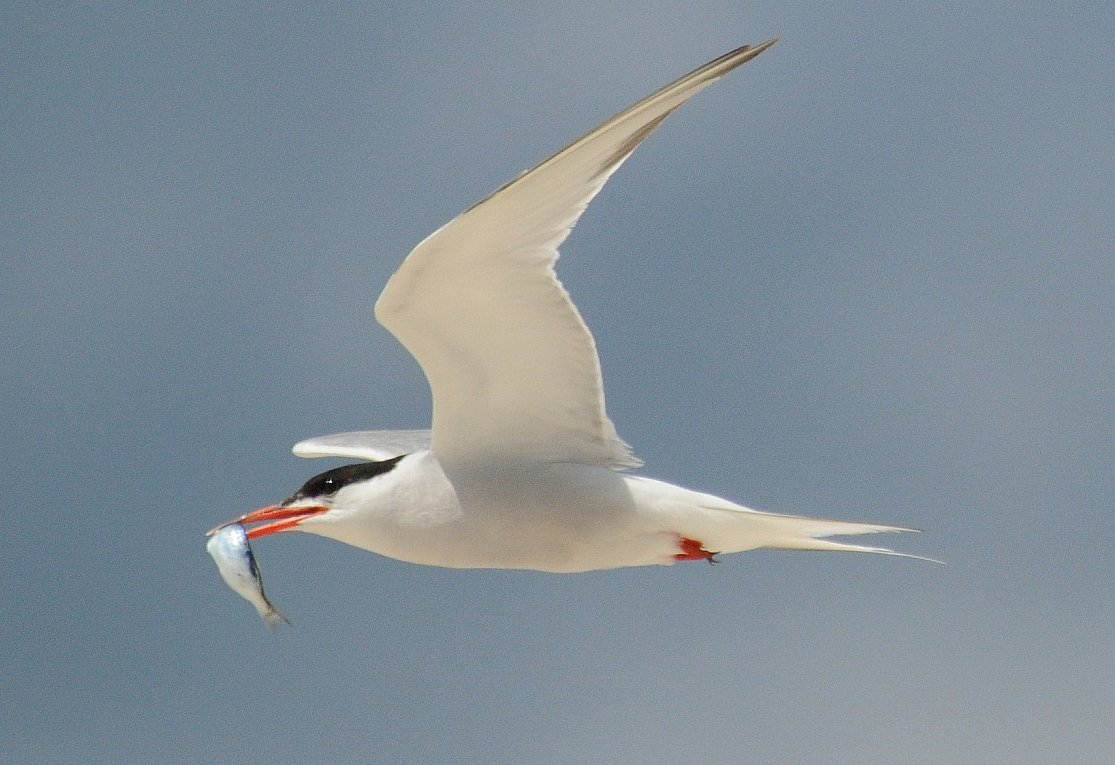
Common tern

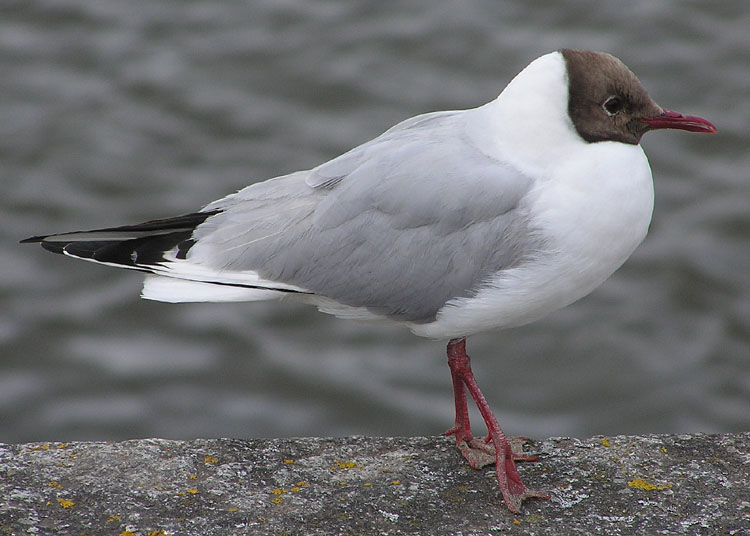
Black-headed gull

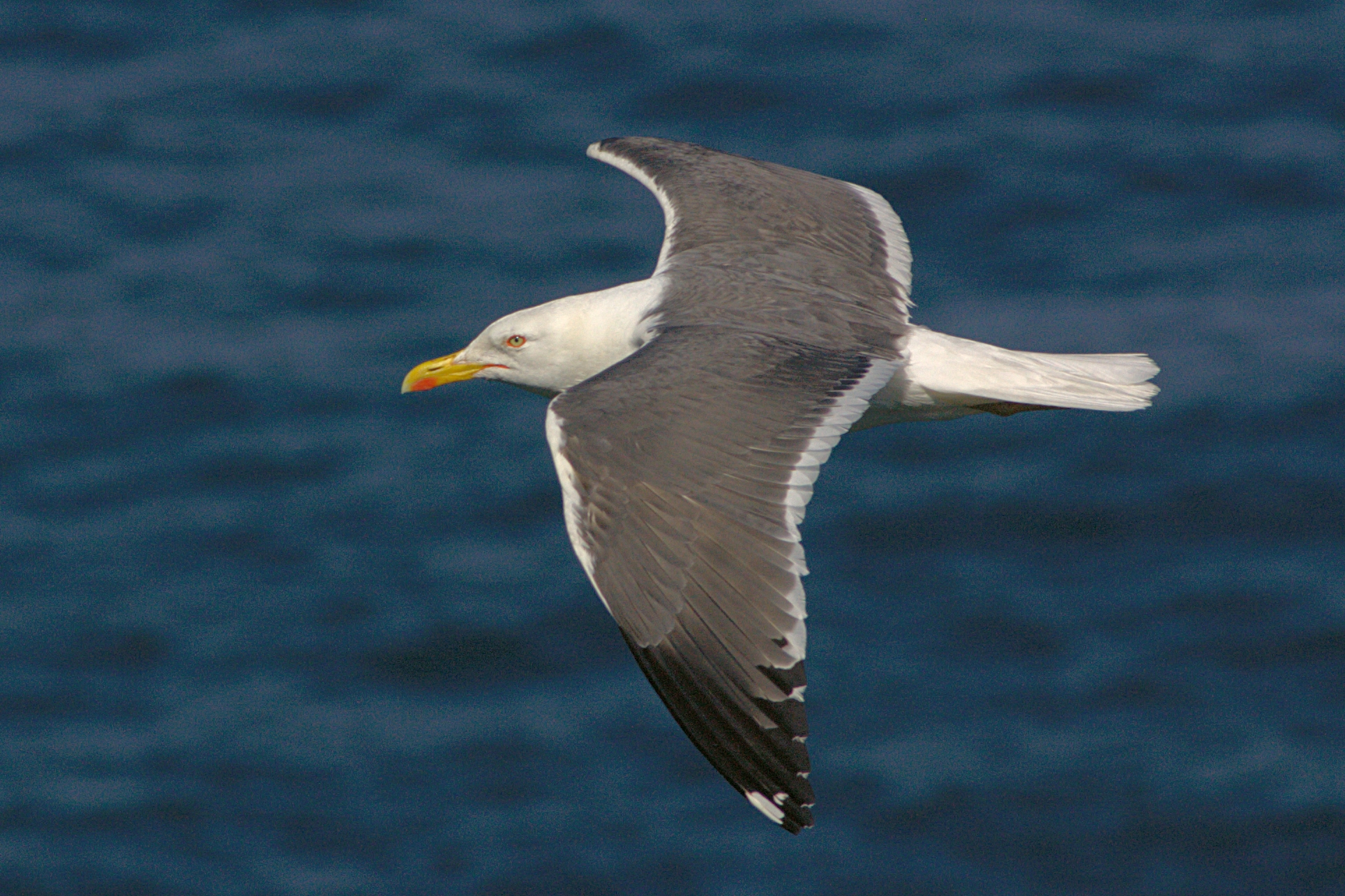
Lesser black-backed gull

Laridae is a family of medium to large seabirds and includes gulls, terns, and skimmers. Gulls are typically grey or white, often with black markings on the head or wings. They have stout, longish bills and webbed feet. Terns are a group of generally medium to large seabirds typically with grey or white plumage, often with black markings on the head. Most terns hunt fish by diving but some pick insects off the surface of fresh water. Terns are generally long-lived birds, with several species known to live in excess of 30 years.

- Black-legged kittiwake, Rissa tridactyla
- Sabine's gull, Xema sabini (A)
- Bonaparte's gull, Chroicocephalus philadelphia (A)
- Black-headed gull, Chroicocephalus ridibundus
- Little gull, Hydrocoloeus minutus (A)
- Laughing gull, Leucophaeus atricilla (A)
- Franklin's gull, Leucophaeus pipixcan (A)
- Mediterranean gull, Ichthyaetus melanocephalus (A)
- Audouin's gull, Ichthyaetus audouinii (A)
- Common gull, Larus canus (A)
- Short-billed gull, Larus brachyrhynchus (A)
- Ring-billed gull, Larus delawarensis
- Herring gull, Larus argentatus (A)
- Yellow-legged gull, Larus michahellis
- Iceland gull, Larus glaucoides (A)
- Lesser black-backed gull, Larus fuscus
- Glaucous gull, Larus hyperboreus
- Great black-backed gull, Larus marinus
- Brown noddy, Anous stolidus (A)
- Sooty tern, Onychoprion fuscatus (A)
- Bridled tern, Onychoprion anaethetus (A)
- Little tern, Sternula albifrons (A)
- Least tern, Sternula antillarum (A)
- Gull-billed tern, Gelochelidon nilotica (A)
- Caspian tern, Hydroprogne caspia (A)
- Black tern, Chlidonias niger (A)
- White-winged tern, Chlidonias leucopterus (A)
- Whiskered tern, Chlidonias hybrida (A)
- Roseate tern, Sterna dougallii
- Common tern, Sterna hirundo
- Arctic tern, Sterna paradisaea
- Forster's tern, Sterna forsteri (A)
- Sandwich tern, Thalasseus sandvicensis (A)
- West African crested tern, Thalasseus albididorsalis (A)

== Tropicbirds ==
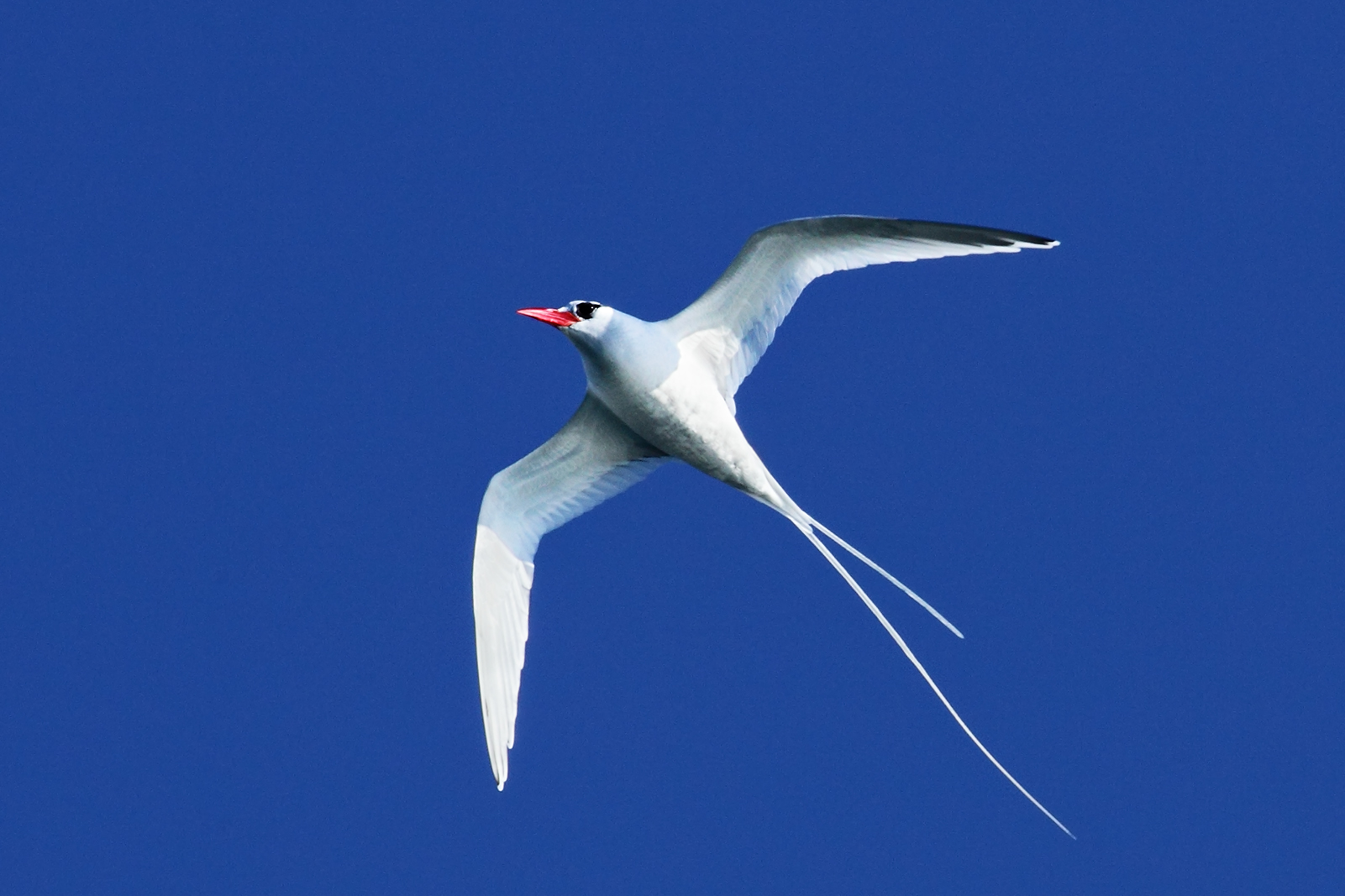
Red-billed tropicbird

Order: Phaethontiformes Family: Phaethontidae

Tropicbirds are slender white birds of tropical oceans, with exceptionally long central tail feathers. Their heads and long wings have black markings.

- White-tailed tropicbird, Phaethon lepturus (A)
- Red-billed tropicbird, Phaethon aethereus (A)

== Loons ==
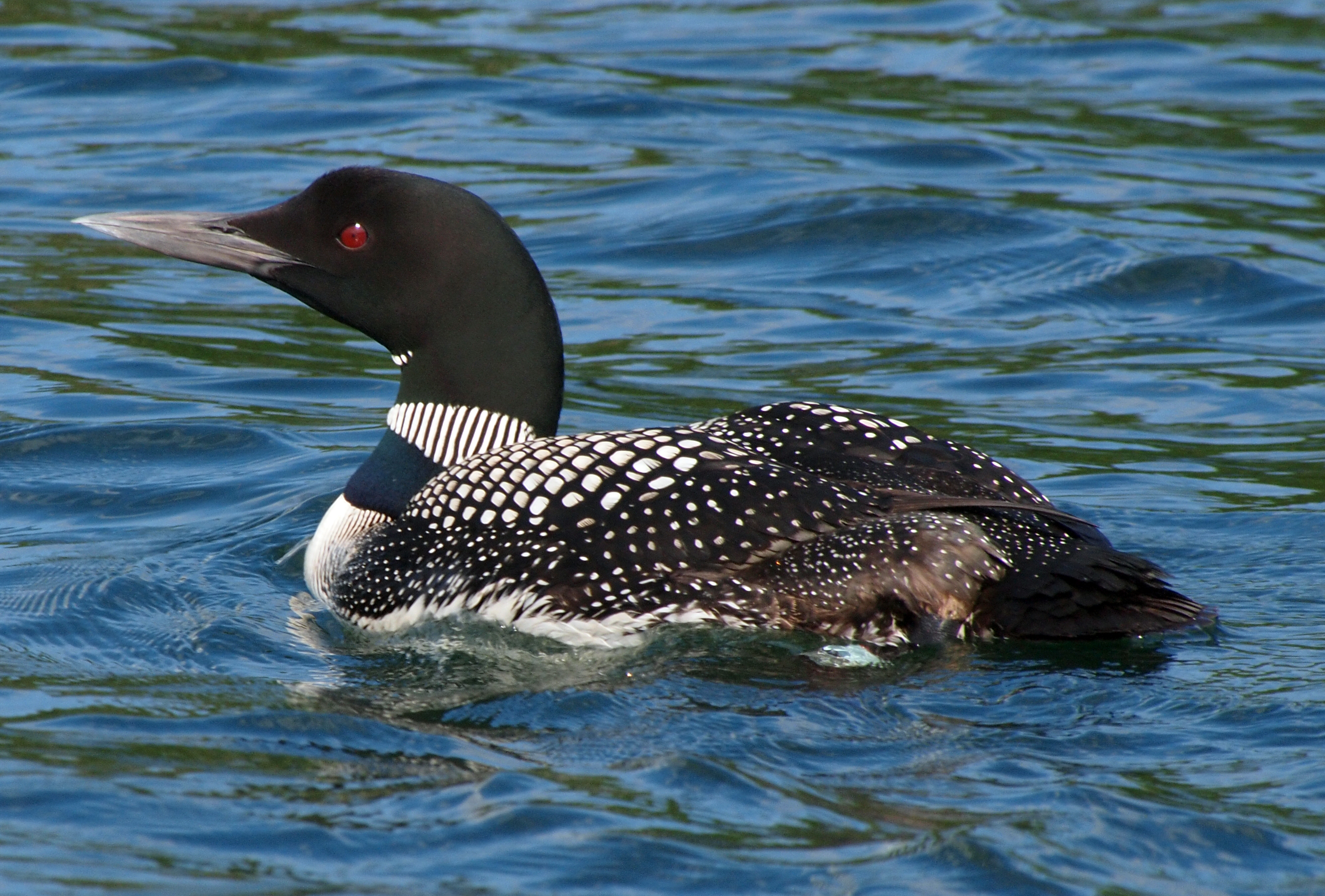
Common loon

Order: Galliformes Family: Gaviidae

The loons or divers are a group of aquatic birds found in many parts of North America and northern Eurasia (Europe, Asia and debatably Africa). All living species of loons are members of the genus (Gavia), family (Gaviidae) and order (Gaviiformes).

- Red-throated loon, Gavia stellata (A)
- Arctic loon, Gavia arctica (A)
- Common loon, Gavia immer (A)

== Albatrosses ==
Order: Procellariiformes Family: Diomedeidae

The albatrosses are among the largest of flying birds, and the great albatrosses from the genus Diomedea have the largest wingspans of any extant birds.

- Black-browed albatross, Thalassarche melanophris (A)

== Southern storm-petrels ==
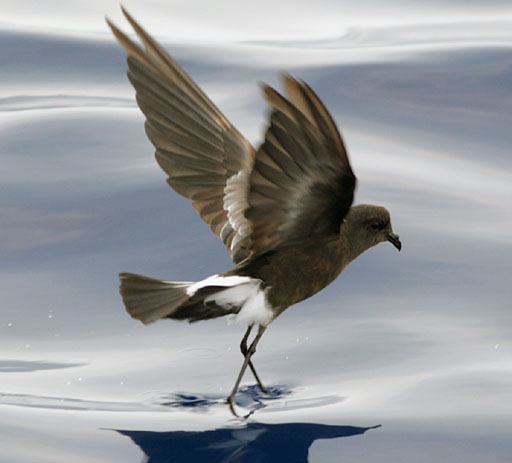
Wilson's storm-petrel

Order: Procellariiformes Family: Oceanitidae

The southern storm-petrels are relatives of the petrels and are the smallest seabirds. They feed on planktonic crustaceans and small fish picked from the surface, typically while hovering. The flight is fluttering and sometimes bat-like.

- Wilson's storm-petrel, Oceanites oceanicus
- White-faced storm-petrel, Pelagodroma marina (A)

== Northern storm-petrels ==
Order: Procellariiformes Family: Hydrobatidae

Though the members of this family are similar in many respects to the southern storm-petrels, including their general appearance and habits, there are enough genetic differences to warrant their placement in a separate family.

- Leach's storm-petrel, Hydrobates leucorhous
- Swinhoe's storm-petrel, Hydrobates monorhis (A)
- Band-rumped storm-petrel, Hydrobates castro
- Monteiro's storm-petrel, Hydrobates monteiroi

== Shearwaters and petrels ==
Order: Procellariiformes Family: Procellariidae

The procellariids are the main group of medium-sized "true petrels", characterised by united nostrils with medium septum and a long outer functional primary.

- Northern fulmar, Fulmarus glacialis (A)
- Kermadec petrel, Pterodroma neglecta (A)
- Trindade petrel, Pterodroma arminjoniana (A)
- Zino's petrel, Pterodroma madeira (A)
- Fea's petrel, Pterodroma feae (A)
- Bermuda petrel, Pterodroma cahow
- Black-capped petrel, Pterodroma hasitata (A)
- Bulwer's petrel, Bulweria bulwerii
- Cory's shearwater, Calonectris diomedea
- Flesh-footed shearwater, Ardenna carneipes (A)
- Great shearwater, Ardenna gravis
- Sooty shearwater, Ardenna griseus
- Manx shearwater, Puffinus puffinus
- Balearic shearwater, Puffinus mauretanicus (A)
- Barolo shearwater, Puffinus baroli

== Storks ==
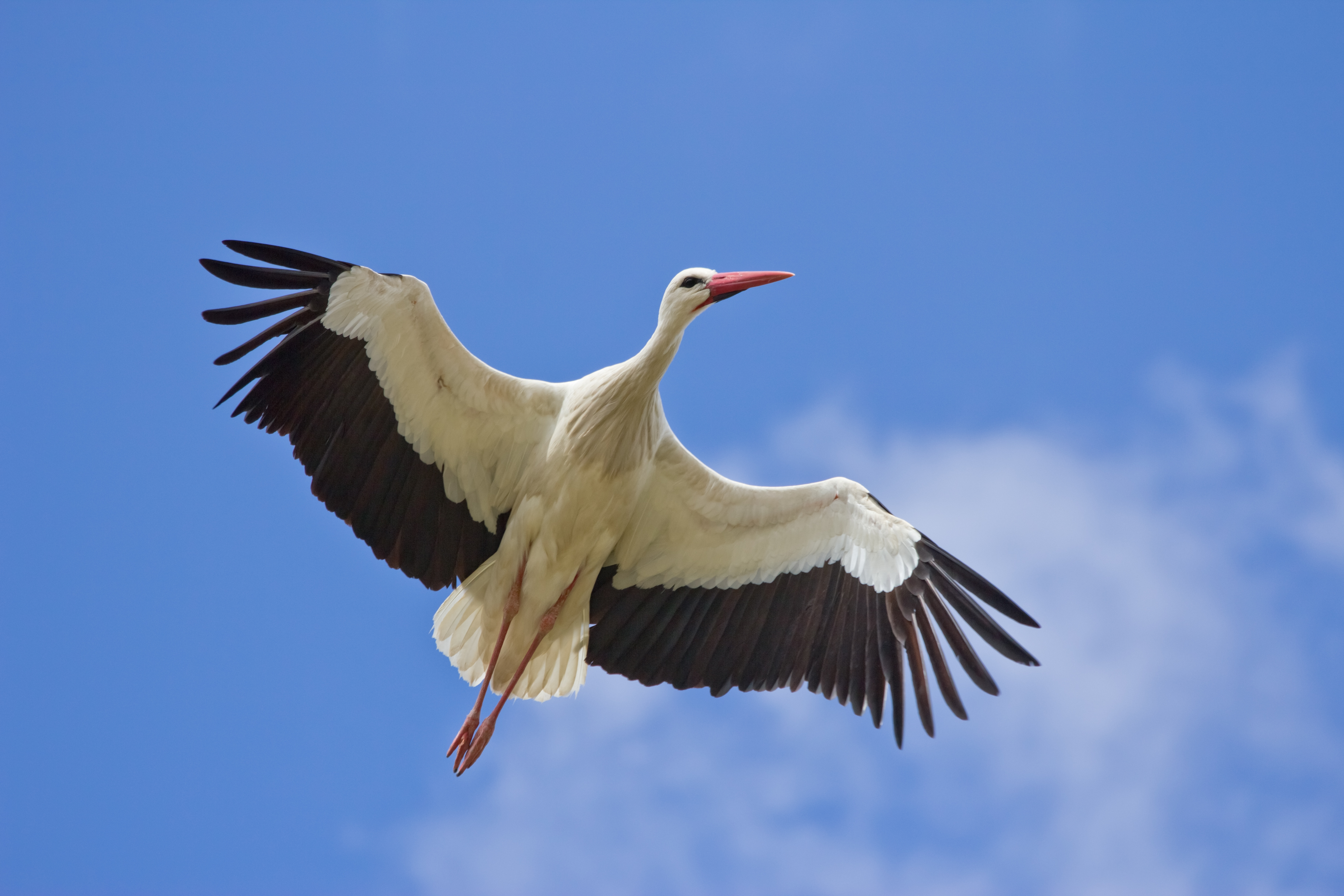
White stork

Order: Ciconiiformes Family: Ciconiidae

Storks are large, long-legged, long-necked, wading birds with long, stout bills. Storks are mute, but bill-clattering is an important mode of communication at the nest. Their nests can be large and may be reused for many years. Many species are migratory.

- Black stork, Ciconia nigra (A)
- White stork, Ciconia ciconia (A)

== Frigatebirds ==
Order: Suliformes Family: Fregatidae

Frigatebirds are large seabirds usually found over tropical oceans. They are large, black-and-white or completely black, with long wings and deeply forked tails. The males have coloured inflatable throat pouches. They do not swim or walk and cannot take off from a flat surface. Having the largest wingspan-to-body-weight ratio of any bird, they are essentially aerial, able to stay aloft for more than a week.

- Magnificent frigatebird, Fregata magnificens (A)

== Boobies and gannets ==
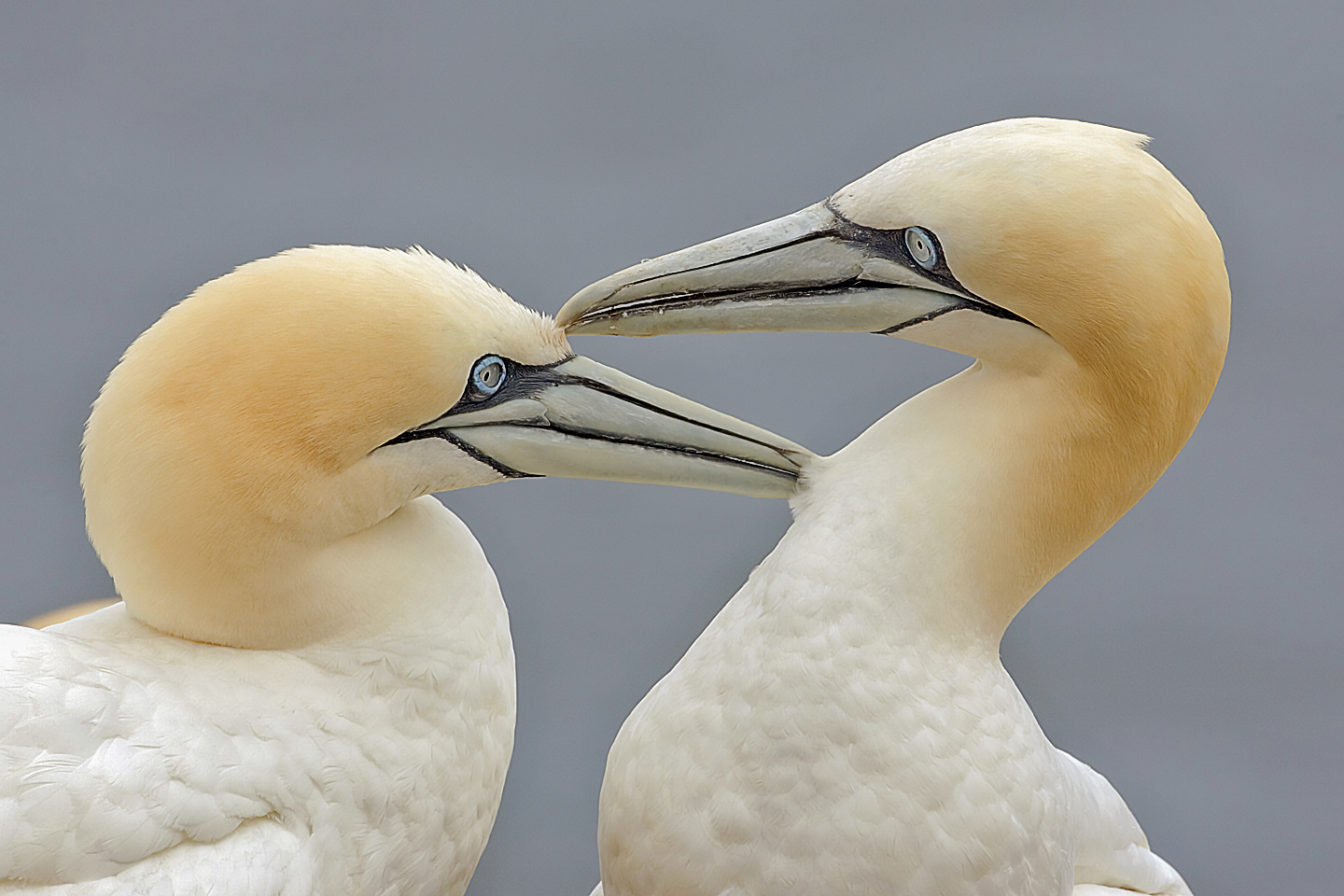
Northern gannet

Order: Suliformes Family: Sulidae

The sulids comprise the gannets and boobies. Both groups are medium to large coastal seabirds that plunge-dive for fish.

- Masked booby, Sula dactylatra (A)
- Brown booby, Sula leucogaster (A)
- Red-footed booby, Sula sula (A)
- Northern gannet, Morus bassanus
- Cape gannet, Morus capensis (A)

== Cormorants and shags ==
Order: Suliformes Family: Phalacrocoracidae

Phalacrocoracidae is a family of medium to large coastal, fish-eating seabirds that includes cormorants and shags. Plumage colouration varies, with the majority having mainly dark plumage, some species being black-and-white and a few being colourful.

- Great cormorant, Phalacrocorax carbo (A)
- Double-crested cormorant, Nannopterum auritum (A)

== Herons, egrets, and bitterns ==
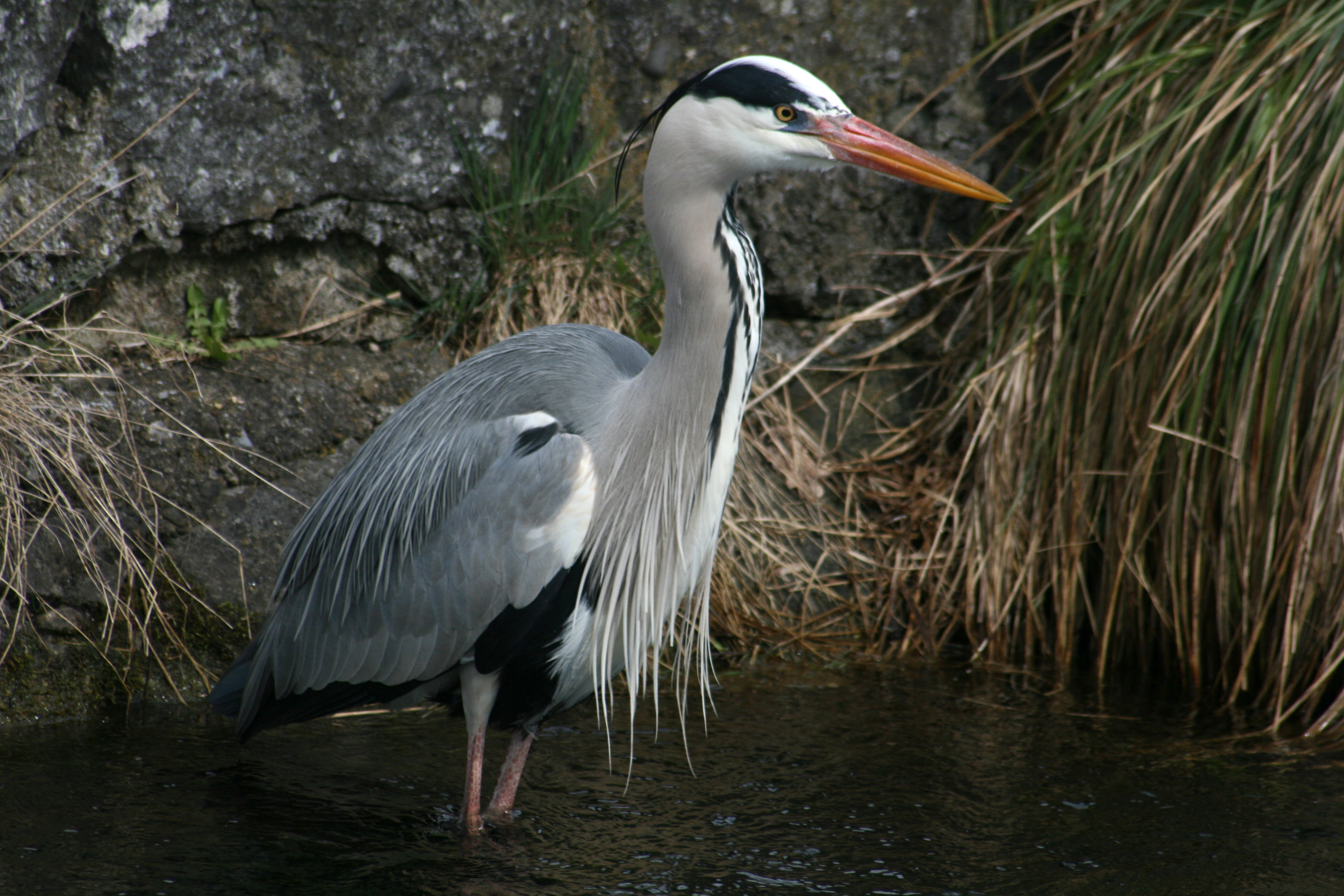
Gray heron

Order: Pelecaniformes Family: Ardeidae

The family Ardeidae contains the bitterns, herons and egrets. Herons and egrets are medium to large wading birds with long necks and legs. Bitterns tend to be shorter necked and more wary. Members of Ardeidae fly with their necks retracted, unlike other long-necked birds such as storks, ibises and spoonbills.

- American bittern, Botaurus lentiginosus (A)
- Great bittern, Botaurus stellaris (A)
- Little bittern, Ixobrychus minutus (A)
- Least bittern, Ixobrychus exilis (A)
- Great blue heron, Ardea herodias (A)
- Gray heron, Ardea cinerea
- Purple heron, Ardea purpurea (A)
- Great egret, Egretta alba (A)
- Little egret, Egretta garzetta (A)
- Western reef-heron, Egretta gularis (A)
- Snowy egret, Egretta thula (A)
- Little blue heron, Egretta caerulea (A)
- Tricolored heron, Egretta tricolor (A)
- Cattle egret, Bubulcus ibis
- Squacco heron, Ardeola ralloides (A)
- Green heron, Butorides virescens (A)
- Black-crowned night-heron, Nycticorax nycticorax (A)
- Yellow-crowned night-heron, Nyctanassa violacea (A)

== Ibises and spoonbills ==
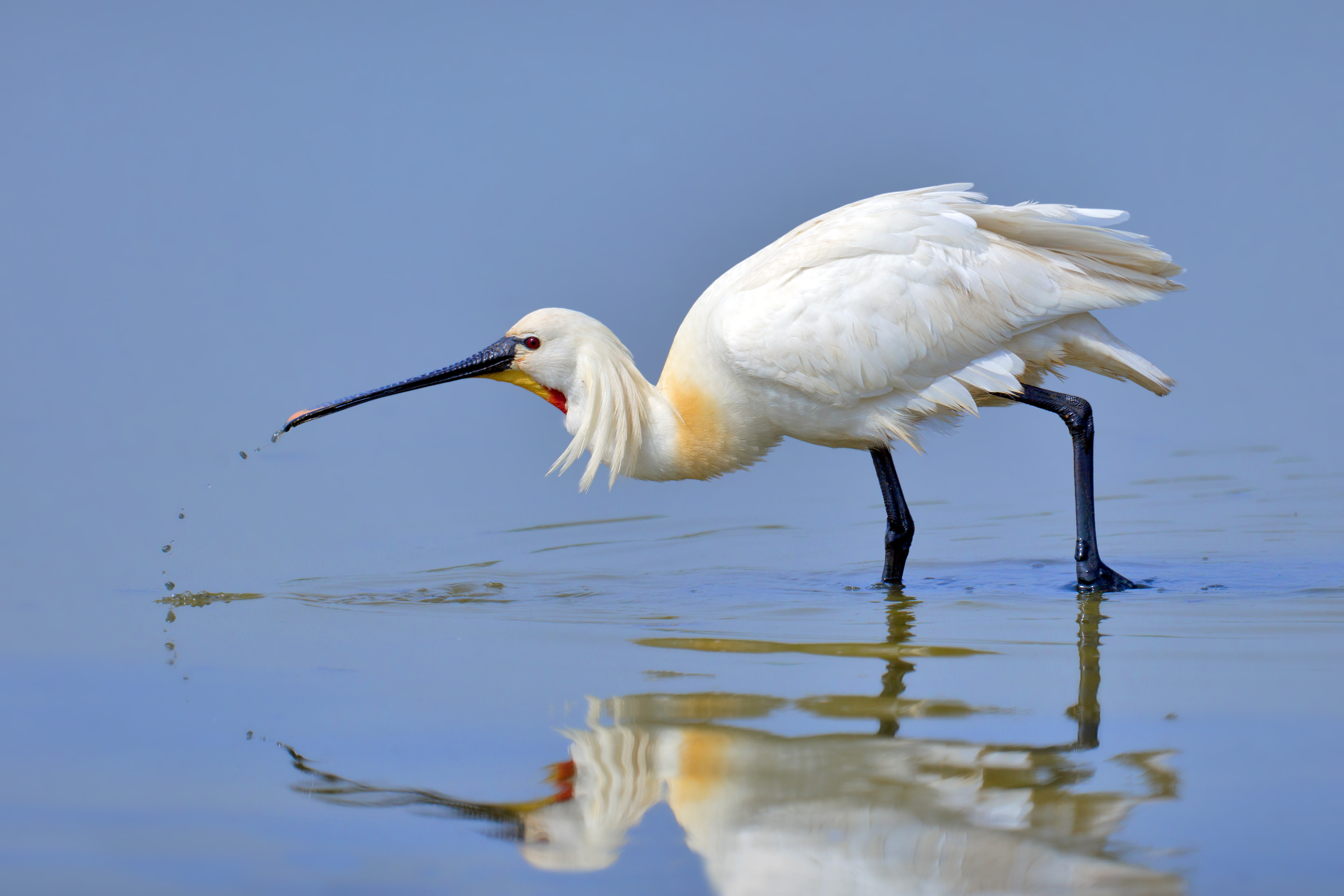
Eurasian spoonbill

Order: Pelecaniformes Family: Threskiornithidae

Threskiornithidae is a family of large terrestrial and wading birds which includes the ibises and spoonbills. They have long, broad wings with 11 primary and about 20 secondary feathers. They are strong fliers and despite their size and weight, very capable soarers.

- Glossy ibis, Plegadis falcinellus (A)
- Northern bald ibis, Geronticus eremita (I)
- Eurasian spoonbill, Platalea leucorodia (A)

== Osprey ==
Order: Accipitriformes Family: Pandionidae

The family Pandionidae contains only one species, the osprey. The osprey is a medium-large raptor and a specialist fish-eater with a worldwide distribution.

- Osprey, Pandion haliaetus (A)

== Hawks, kites and eagles ==
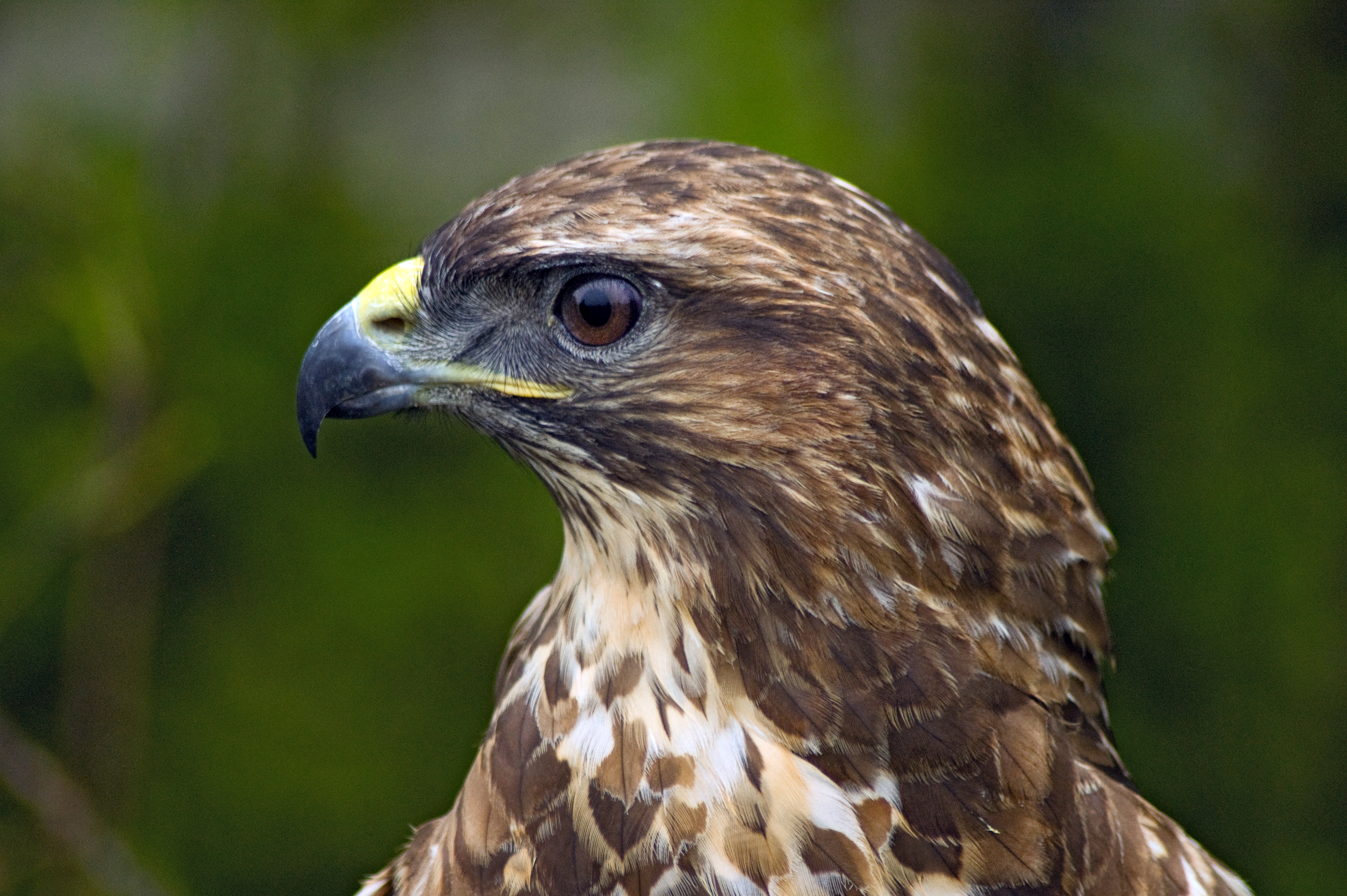
Common buzzard

Order: Accipitriformes Family: Accipitridae

Accipitridae is a family of birds of prey, which includes hawks, eagles, kites, harriers and Old World vultures. These birds have powerful hooked beaks for tearing flesh from their prey, strong legs, powerful talons and keen eyesight.

- Egyptian vulture, Neophron percnopterus (A)
- Swallow-tailed kite, Elanoides forficatus (A)
- Eurasian marsh-harrier, Circus aeruginosus (A)
- Hen harrier, Circus cyaneus (A)
- Northern harrier, Circus hudsonius (A)
- Pallid harrier, Circus macrourus (A)
- Montagu's harrier, Circus pygargus (A)
- Red kite, Milvus milvus (A)
- Black kite, Milvus migrans (A)
- Rough-legged hawk, Buteo lagopus (A)
- Common buzzard, Buteo buteo

== Barn-owls ==
Order: Strigiformes Family: Tytonidae

Barn-owls are medium-sized to large owls with large heads and characteristic heart-shaped faces. They have long strong legs with powerful talons.

- Barn owl, Tyto alba

== Owls ==
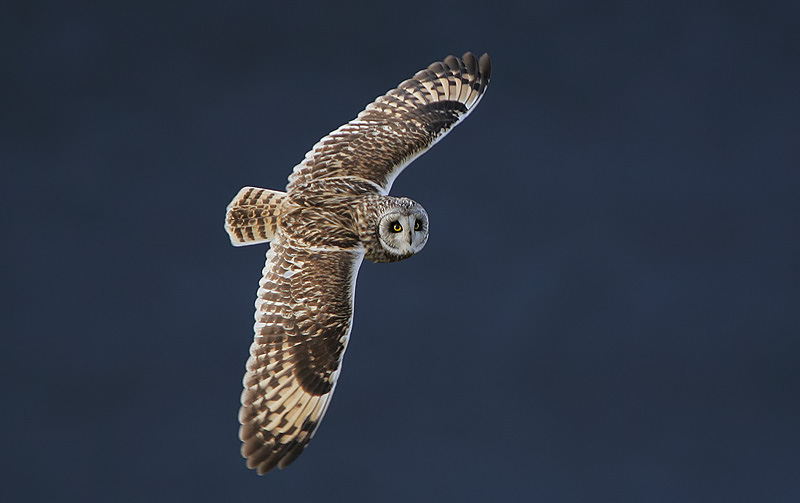
Short-eared owl

Order: Strigiformes Family: Strigidae

Typical owls are small to large solitary nocturnal birds of prey. They have large forward-facing eyes and ears, a hawk-like beak and a conspicuous circle of feathers around each eye called a facial disc.

- Snowy owl, Bubo scandiacus (A)
- Long-eared owl, Asio otus
- Short-eared owl, Asio flammeus (A)

== Hoopoes ==
Order: Coraciiformes Family: Upupidae

Hoopoes have black, white and orangey-pink colouring with a large erectile crest on their head. .

- Eurasian hoopoe, Upupa epops (A)

== Kingfishers ==
Order: Coraciiformes Family: Alcedinidae

Kingfishers are medium-sized birds with large heads, long, pointed bills, short legs and stubby tails.

- Common kingfisher, Alcedo atthis (A)
- Belted kingfisher, Megaceryle alcyon (A)

== Bee-eaters ==
Order: Coraciiformes Family: Meropidae

The bee-eaters are a group of near passerine birds in the family Meropidae. Most species are found in Africa but others occur in southern Europe, Madagascar, Australia and New Guinea. They are characterised by richly coloured plumage, slender bodies and usually elongated central tail feathers. All are colourful and have long downturned bills and pointed wings, which give them a swallow-like appearance when seen from afar.

- European bee-eater, Merops apiaster (A)

== Rollers ==
Order: Coraciiformes Family: Coraciidae

Rollers resemble crows in size and build, but are more closely related to the kingfishers and bee-eaters. They share the colourful appearance of those groups with blues and browns predominating. The two inner front toes are connected, but the outer toe is not.

- European roller, Coracias garrulus (A)

== Woodpeckers ==
Order: Piciformes Family: Picidae

Woodpeckers are small to medium-sized birds with chisel-like beaks, short legs, stiff tails and long tongues used for capturing insects. Some species have feet with two toes pointing forward and two backward, while several species have only three toes. Many woodpeckers have the habit of tapping noisily on tree trunks with their beaks.

- Yellow-bellied sapsucker, Sphyrapicus varius (A)
- Northern flicker, Colaptes auratus (A)

== Falcons and caracaras ==
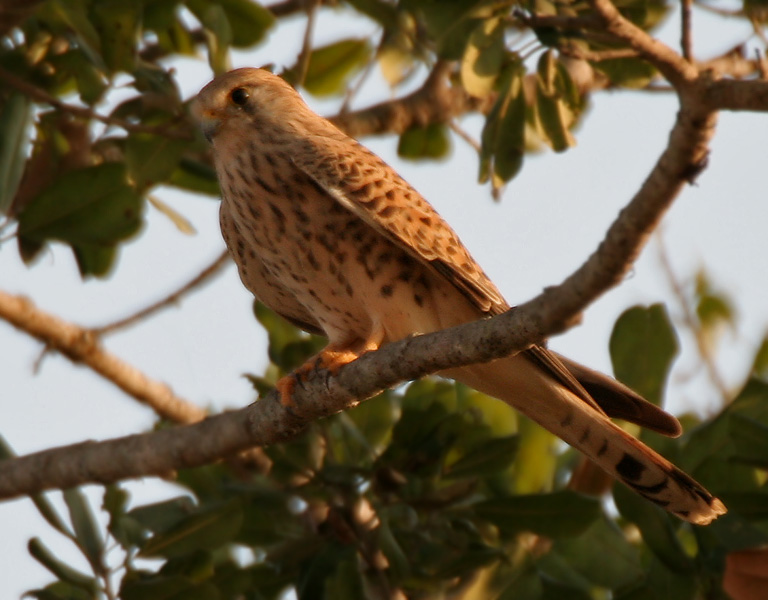
Eurasian kestrel (female)

Order: Falconiformes Family: Falconidae

Falconidae is a family of diurnal birds of prey. They differ from hawks, eagles and kites in that they kill with their beaks instead of their talons.

- Lesser kestrel, Falco naumanni (A)
- Eurasian kestrel, Falco tinnunculus (A)
- American kestrel, Falco sparverius (A)
- Red-footed falcon, Falco vespertinus (A)
- Amur falcon, Falco amurensis (A)
- Eleonora's falcon, Falco eleonorae (A)
- Merlin, Falco columbarius (A)
- Eurasian hobby, Falco subbuteo (A)
- Gyrfalcon, Falco rusticolus (A)
- Peregrine falcon, Falco peregrinus (A)

== Old World parrots ==
Order: Psittaciformes Family: Psittaculidae

Characteristic features of parrots include a strong curved bill, an upright stance, strong legs, and clawed zygodactyl feet. Many parrots are vividly colored, and some are multi-colored. In size they range from 8 cm (3.1 in) to 1 m (3.3 ft) in length. Old World parrots are found from Africa east across south and southeast Asia and Oceania to Australia and New Zealand.

- Rose-ringed parakeet, Psittacula krameri (I)

== Tyrant flycatchers ==
Order: Passeriformes Family: Tyrannidae

Tyrant flycatchers are Passerine birds which occur throughout North and South America. They superficially resemble the Old World flycatchers, but are more robust and have stronger bills. They do not have the sophisticated vocal capabilities of the songbirds. Most, but not all, are rather plain. As the name implies, most are insectivorous.

- Eastern wood-pewee, Contopus virens (A)
- Western kingbird, Tyrannus verticalis (A)

== Vireos, shrike-babblers, and erpornis ==
Order: Passeriformes Family: Vireonidae

The vireos are a group of small to medium-sized passerine birds. They are typically greenish in color and resemble wood warblers apart from their heavier bills.

- White-eyed vireo, Vireo griseus (A)
- Yellow-throated vireo, Vireo flavifrons (A)
- Philadelphia vireo, Vireo philadelphicus (A)
- Warbling vireo, Vireo gilvus (A)
- Red-eyed vireo, Vireo olivaceus (A)

== Old-World orioles ==
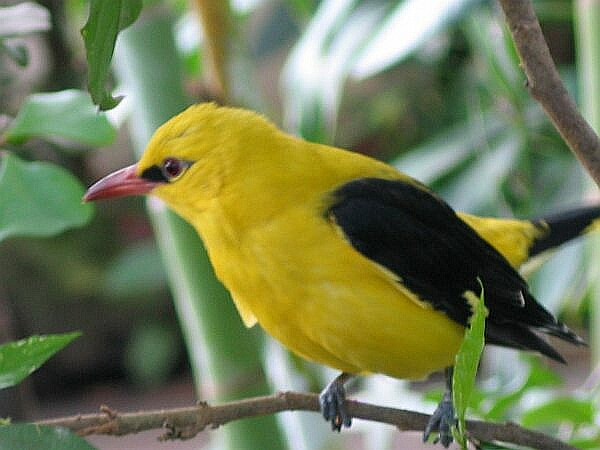
Eurasian golden oriole

Order: Passeriformes Family: Oriolidae

The Old World orioles are colourful medium-sized passerine birds. The beak is slightly curved and hooked, and, except in the figbirds, as long as the head. The plumage of most species is bright and showy, although the females often have duller plumage than the males. They are not related to the New World orioles.

- Eurasian golden oriole, Oriolus oriolus (A)

== Shrikes ==
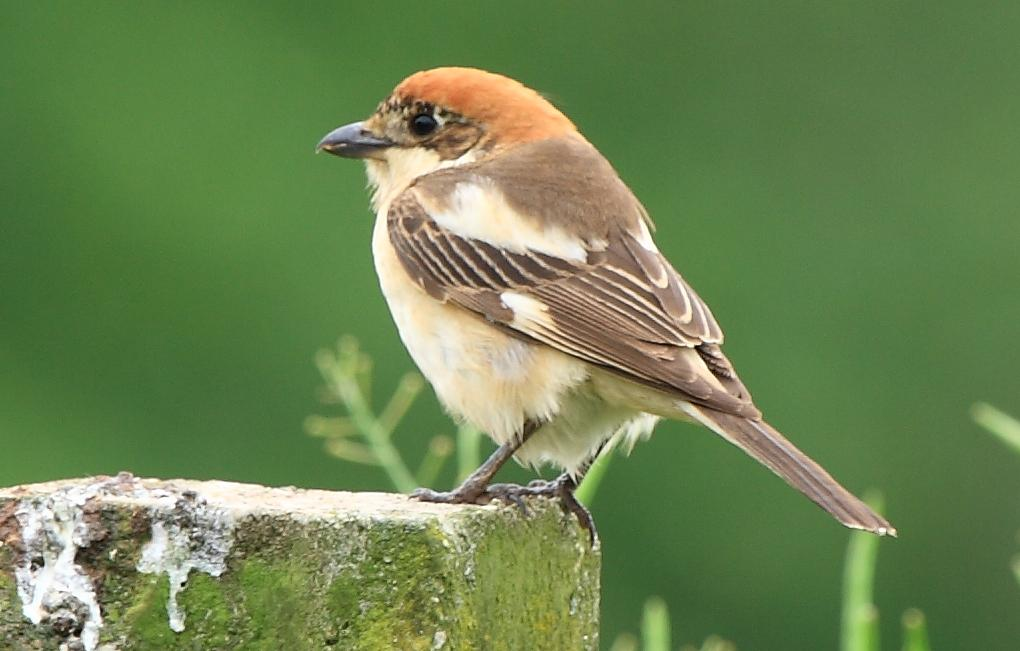
Woodchat shrike

Order: Passeriformes Family: Laniidae

Shrikes are passerine birds known for their habit of catching other birds and small animals and impaling the uneaten portions of their bodies on thorns. A typical shrike's beak is hooked, like a bird of prey.

- Northern shrike, Lanius borealis (A)
- Great gray shrike, Lanius excubitor (A)
- Woodchat shrike, Lanius senator (A)

== Crows, jays, and magpies ==
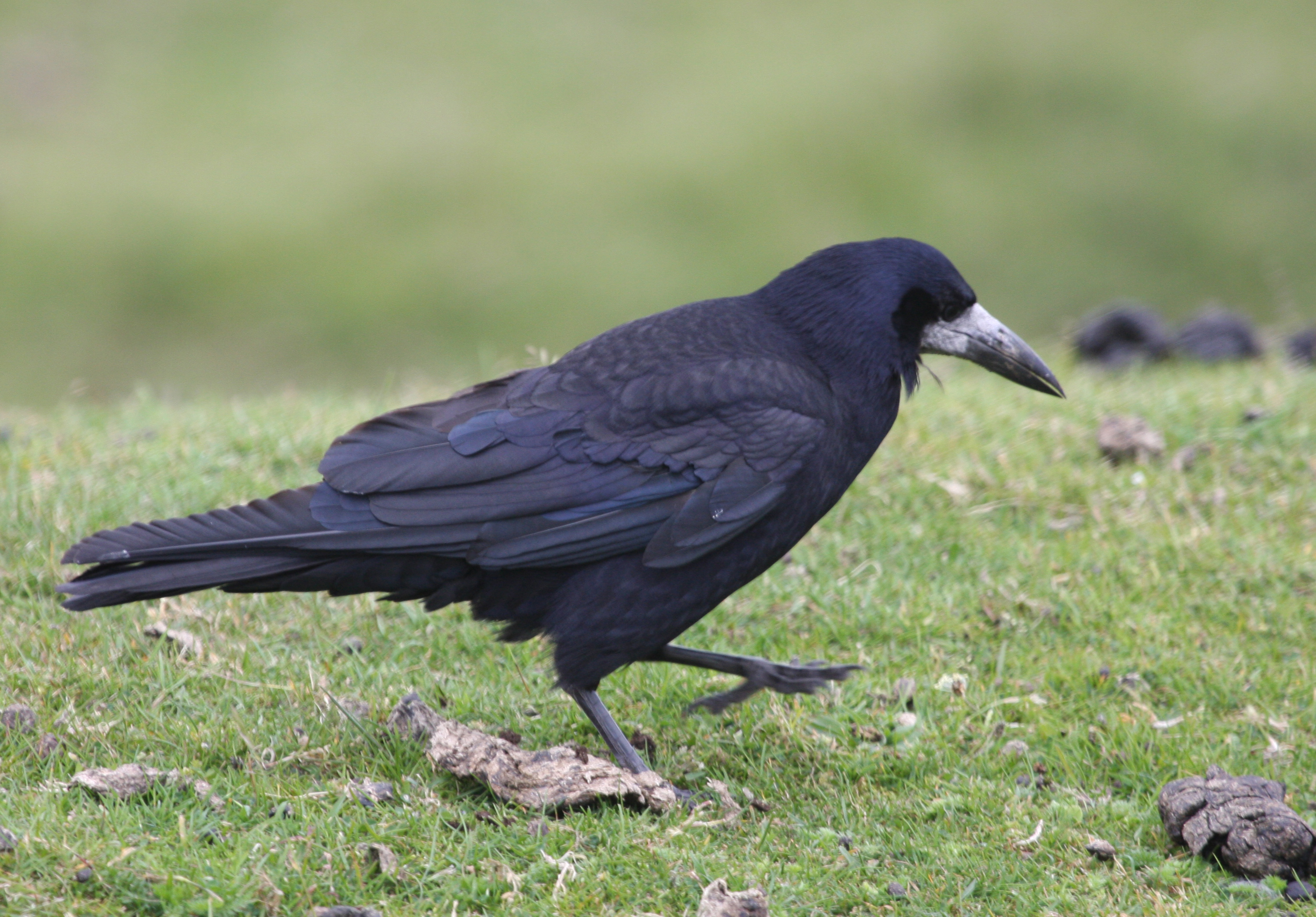
Rook

Order: Passeriformes Family: Corvidae

The family Corvidae includes crows, ravens, jays, choughs, magpies, treepies, nutcrackers and ground jays. Corvids are above average in size among the Passeriformes, and some of the larger species show high levels of intelligence.

- Eurasian jackdaw, Corvus monedula (A)
- Rook, Corvus frugilegus (A)
- Carrion crow, Corvus corone (A)

== Larks ==
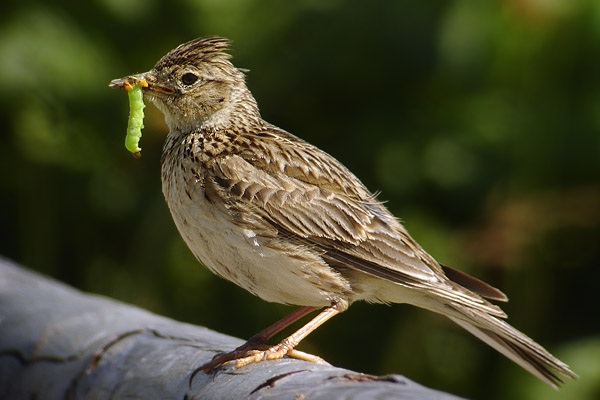
Sky lark

Order: Passeriformes Family: Alaudidae

Larks are small terrestrial birds with often extravagant songs and display flights. Most larks are fairly dull in appearance. Their food is insects and seeds.

- Greater short-toed lark, Calandrella brachydactyla (A)
- Eurasian skylark, Alauda arvensis
- Crested lark, Galerida cristata (A)

== Reed warblers and allies ==
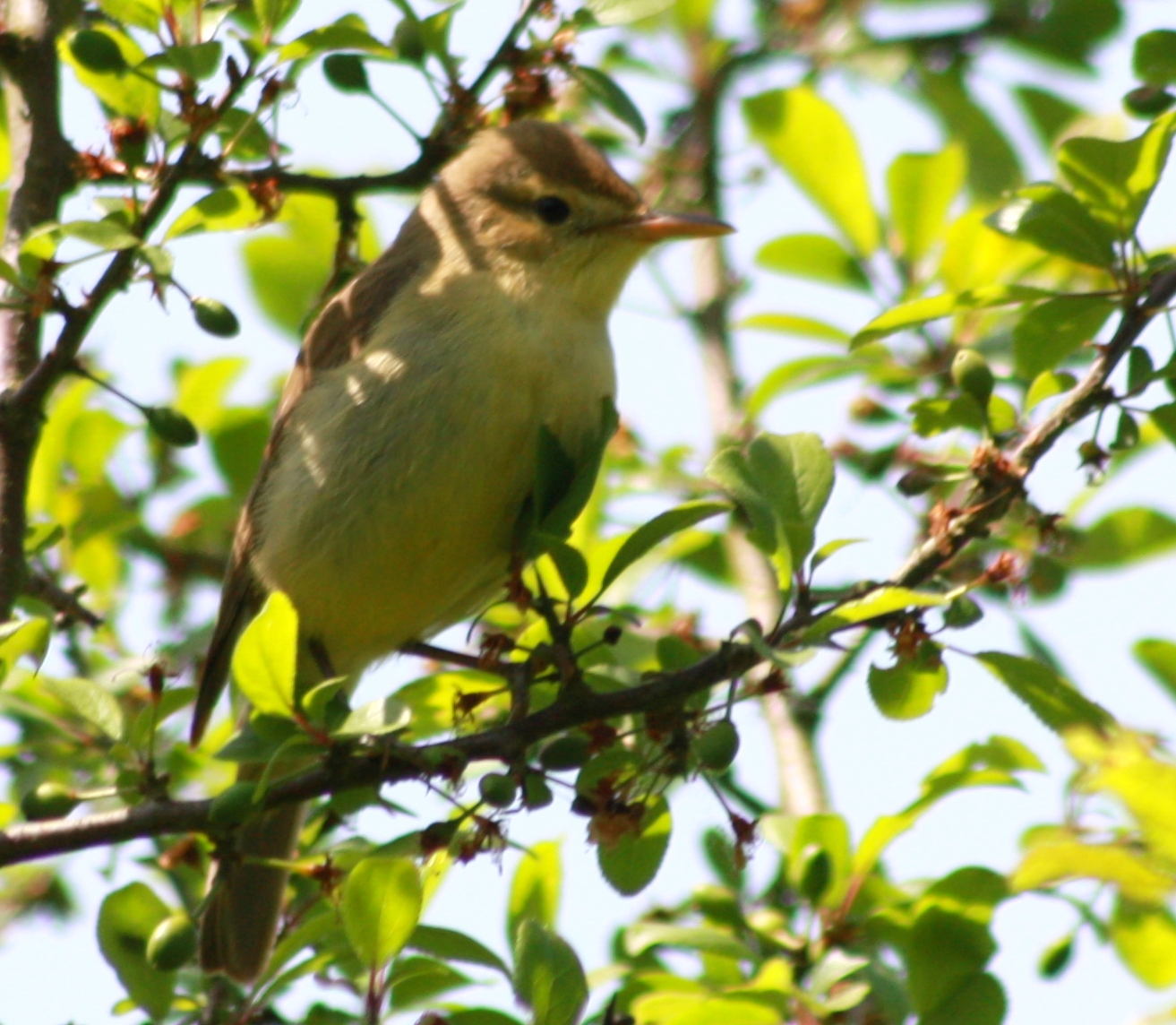
Melodious warbler

Order: Passeriformes Family: Acrocephalidae

Acrocephalidae (the marsh- and tree-warblers or acrocephalid warblers) is a family of oscine passerine birds, in the superfamily Sylvioidea. Most species are rather plain olivaceous brown above with much yellow to beige below. They are usually found in open woodland, reedbeds or tall grass.

- Melodious warbler, Hippolais polyglotta (A)
- Sedge warbler, Acrocephalus schoenobaenus (A)
- Paddyfield warbler, Acrocephalus agricola (A)
- Common reed warbler, Acrocephalus scirpaceus

== Grassbirds and allies ==
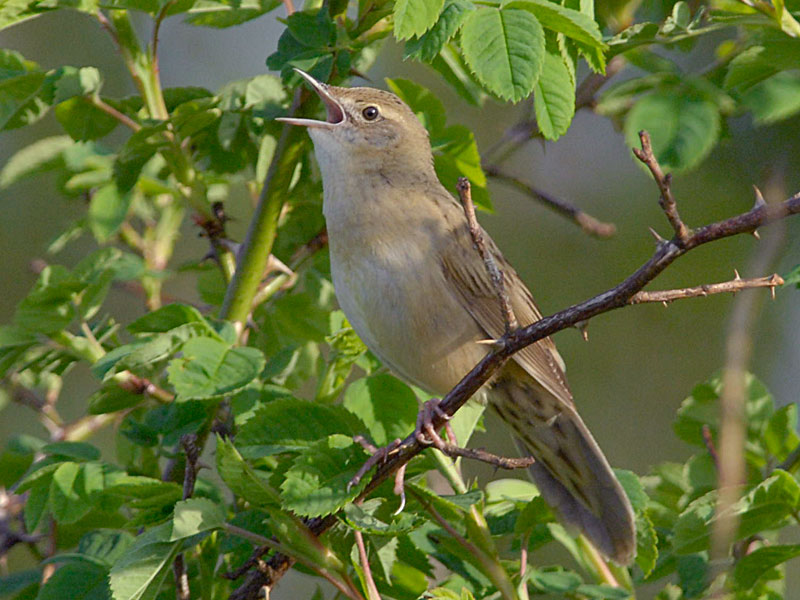
Common grasshopper-warbler

Order: Passeriformes Family: Locustellidae

Locustellidae is a family of small insectivorous songbirds ("warblers"), formerly placed in the Old World warbler family. It contains the grass-warblers, grassbirds, and the Bradypterus "bush-warblers". The species are smallish birds with tails that are usually long and pointed. Most live in scrubland and frequently hunt food by clambering through thick tangled growth or pursuing it on the ground.

- Common grasshopper-warbler, Locustella naevia (A)

== Swallows ==
Order: Passeriformes Family: Hirundinidae

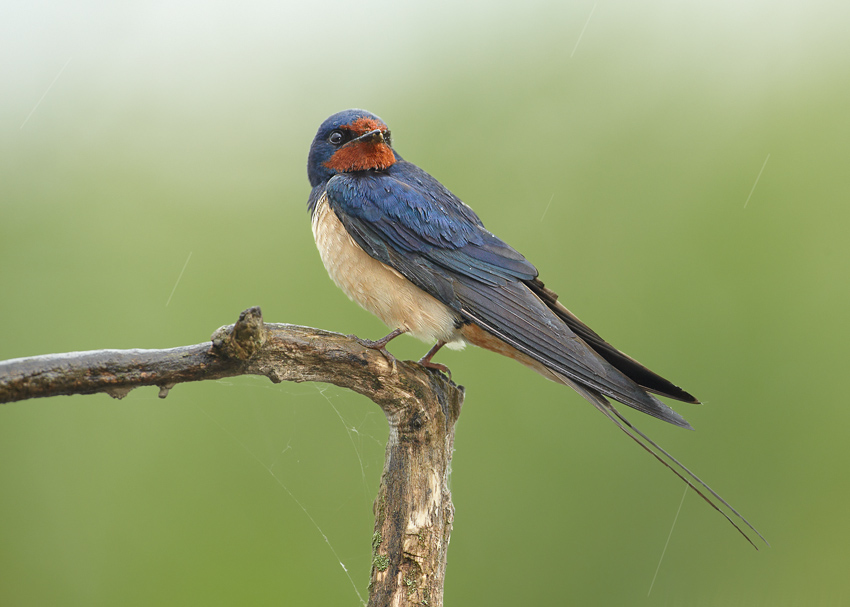
Barn swallow

The family Hirundinidae is adapted to aerial feeding. They have a slender streamlined body, long pointed wings and a short bill with a wide gape. The feet are adapted to perching rather than walking, and the front toes are partially joined at the base.

- Purple martin, Progne subis (A)
- Tree swallow, Tachycineta bicolor (A)
- Plain martin, Riparia paludicola (A)
- Bank swallow, Riparia riparia (A)
- Barn swallow, Hirundo rustica (A)
- Red-rumped swallow, Cecropis daurica (A)
- Cliff swallow, Petrochelidon pyrrhonota (A)
- Common house-martin, Delichon urbicum

== Leaf warblers ==
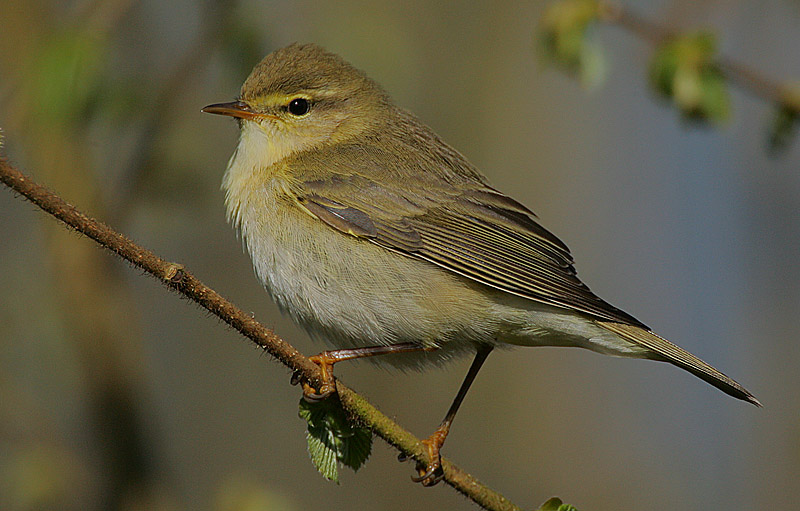
Willow warbler

Order: Passeriformes Family: Phylloscopidae

Phylloscopidae is a family of small insectivorous birds formerly placed in the Old World warbler family. Its members occur in Eurasia, ranging into Wallacea and Africa (and the Arctic warbler breeding east into Alaska). Most live in forest and scrub and frequently catch food on the wing.

- Wood warbler, Phylloscopus sibilatrix (A)
- Yellow-browed warbler, Phylloscopus inornatus (A)
- Willow warbler, Phylloscopus trochilus (A)
- Common chiffchaff, Phylloscopus collybita (A)
- Iberian chiffchaff, Phylloscopus ibericus (A)
- Arctic warbler, Phylloscopus borealis (A)

== Sylviid warblers, parrotbills, and allies ==
Order: Passeriformes Family: Sylviidae

The family Sylviidae is a group of small insectivorous passerine birds. They mainly occur as breeding species, as the common name implies, in Europe, Asia and, to a lesser extent, Africa. Most are of generally undistinguished appearance, but many have distinctive songs.

- Eurasian blackcap, Sylvia atricapilla
- Garden warbler, Sylvia borin (A)
- Barred warbler, Curruca nisoria (A)
- Lesser whitethroat, Curruca curruca (A)
- Eastern subalpine warbler, Curruca cantillans
- Greater whitethroat, Curruca communis (A)

== Kinglets ==
Order: Passeriformes Family: Regulidae

The kinglets, also called crests, are a small group of birds often included in the Old World warblers, but frequently given family status because they also resemble the titmice.

- Ruby-crowned kinglet, Corthylio calendula (A)
- Goldcrest, Regulus regulus

== Wrens ==
Order: Passeriformes Family: Troglodytidae

The wrens are mainly small and inconspicuous except for their loud songs. These birds have short wings and thin down-turned bills. Several species often hold their tails upright. All are insectivorous.

- Eurasian wren, Troglodytes troglodytes (A)

== Mockingbirds and thrashers ==
Order: Passeriformes Family: Mimidae

The mimids are a family of passerine birds which includes thrashers, mockingbirds, tremblers, and the New World catbirds. These birds are notable for their vocalization, especially their remarkable ability to mimic a wide variety of birds and other sounds heard outdoors. The species tend towards dull grays and browns in their appearance.

- Gray catbird, Dumetella carolinensis (A)

== Starlings ==
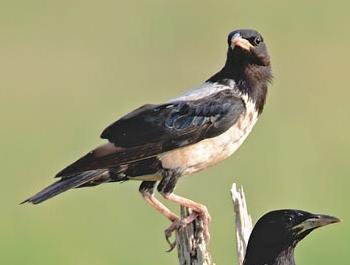
Rosy starling

Order: Passeriformes Family: Sturnidae

Starlings are small to medium-sized passerine birds. Their flight is strong and direct and they are very gregarious. Their preferred habitat is fairly open country. They eat insects and fruit. Plumage is typically dark with a metallic sheen.

- European starling, Sturnus vulgaris
- Spotless starling, Sturnus unicolor
- Rosy starling, Pastor roseus (A)

== Thrushes and allies ==
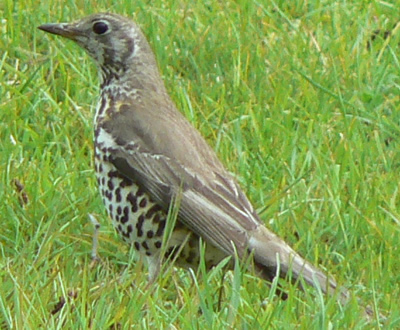
Mistle thrush

Order: Passeriformes Family: Turdidae

The thrushes are a group of passerine birds that occur mainly in the Old World. They are plump, soft plumaged, small to medium-sized insectivores or sometimes omnivores, often feeding on the ground. Many have attractive songs.

- Veery, Catharus fuscescens (A)
- Gray-cheeked thrush, Catharus minimus (A)
- Swainson's thrush, Catharus ustulatus (A)
- Hermit thrush, Catharus guttatus (A)
- Wood thrush, Hylocichla mustelina (A)
- Mistle thrush, Turdus viscivorus (A)
- Song thrush, Turdus philomelos (A)
- Redwing, Turdus iliacus (A)
- Eurasian blackbird, Turdus merula
- American robin, Turdus migratorius (A)
- Fieldfare, Turdus pilaris
- Ring ouzel, Turdus torquatus (A)
- Dusky thrush, Turdus eunomus (A)
- Naumann's thrush, Turdus naumanni (A)

== Old World flycatchers ==
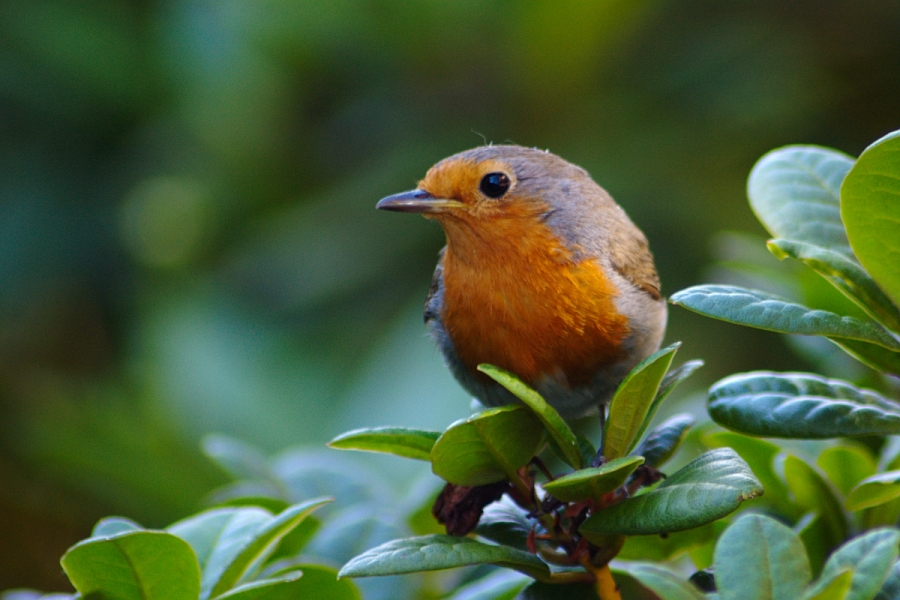
European robin

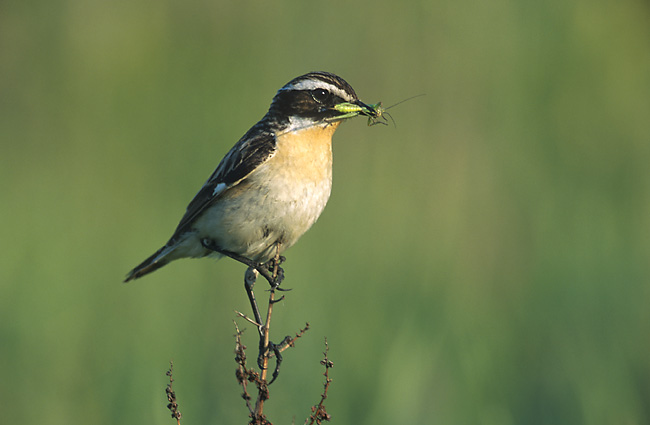
Whinchat

Order: Passeriformes Family: Muscicapidae

Old World flycatchers are a large group of small passerine birds native to the Old World. They are mainly small arboreal insectivores. The appearance of these birds is highly varied, but they mostly have weak songs and harsh calls.

- Spotted flycatcher, Muscicapa striata (A)
- European robin, Erithacus rubecula
- Red-breasted flycatcher, Ficedula parva (A)
- European pied flycatcher, Ficedula hypoleuca (A)
- Common redstart, Phoenicurus phoenicurus (A)
- Black redstart, Phoenicurus ochruros (A)
- Rufous-tailed rock-thrush, Monticola saxatilis (A)
- Whinchat, Saxicola rubetra (A)
- European stonechat, Saxicola rubicola (A)
- Northern wheatear, Oenanthe oenanthe
- Isabelline wheatear, Oenanthe isabellina (A)
- Western black-eared wheatear, Oenanthe hispanica (A)

== Waxwings ==
Order: Passeriformes Family: Bombycillidae

The waxwings are a group of passerine birds with soft silky plumage and unique red tips to some of the wing feathers. In the Bohemian and cedar waxwings, these tips look like sealing wax and give the group its name. These are arboreal birds of northern forests. They live on insects in summer and berries in winter.

- Bohemian waxwing, Bombycilla garrulus (A)
- Cedar waxwing, Bombycilla cedrorum (A)

== Waxbills and allies ==
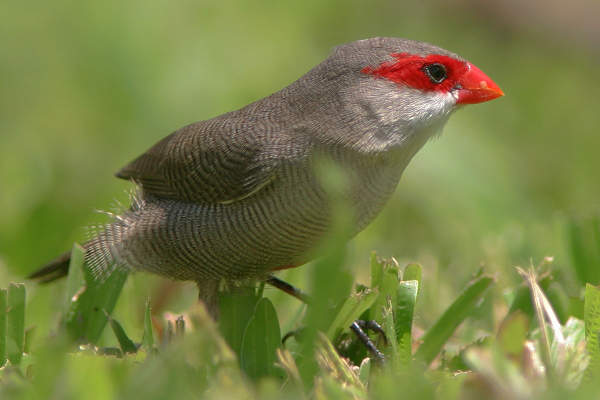
Common waxbill

Order: Passeriformes Family: Estrildidae

The estrildid finches are small passerine birds of the Old World tropics and Australasia. They are gregarious and often colonial seed eaters with short thick but pointed bills. They are all similar in structure and habits, but have wide variation in plumage colours and patterns.

- Common waxbill, Estrilda astrild (I)

== Old World sparrows ==
Order: Passeriformes Family: Passeridae

Old World sparrows are small passerine birds. In general, sparrows tend to be small, plump, brown or grey birds with short tails and short powerful beaks. Sparrows are seed eaters, but they also consume small insects.

- House sparrow, Passer domesticus
- Rock sparrow, Petronia petronia (A)

== Wagtails and pipits ==
Order: Passeriformes Family: Motacillidae

Motacillidae is a family of small passerine birds with medium to long tails. They include the wagtails, longclaws and pipits. They are slender, ground feeding insectivores of open country.

- Gray wagtail, Motacilla cinerea
- Western yellow wagtail, Motacilla flava (A)
- Citrine wagtail, Motacilla citreola (A)
- White wagtail, Motacilla alba (A)
- Tawny pipit, Anthus campestris (A)
- Meadow pipit, Anthus pratensis (A)
- Tree pipit, Anthus trivialis (A)
- Red-throated pipit, Anthus cervinus (A)
- American pipit, Anthus rubescens (A)

== Finches, euphonias, and allies ==
Order: Passeriformes Family: Fringillidae

Finches are seed-eating passerine birds, that are small to moderately large and have a strong beak, usually conical and in some species very large. All have twelve tail feathers and nine primaries. These birds have a bouncing flight with alternating bouts of flapping and gliding on closed wings, and most sing well.

- Azores chaffinch, Fringilla moreletti (E)
- Brambling, Fringilla montifringilla (A)
- Azores bullfinch, Pyrrhula murina (E)
- European greenfinch, Chloris chloris (I)
- Eurasian linnet, Linaria cannabina
- Redpoll, Acanthis flammea (A)
- Red crossbill, Loxia curvirostra (A)
- European goldfinch, Carduelis carduelis (I)
- European serin, Serinus serinus (A)
- Island canary, Serinus canaria
- Eurasian siskin, Spinus spinus (A)

== Longspurs and snow buntings ==
Order: Passeriformes Family: Calcariidae

The Calcariidae are a small family of passerine birds.

- Lapland longspur, Calcarius lapponicus (A)
- Snow bunting, Plectrophenax nivalis

== Old World buntings ==
Order: Passeriformes Family: Emberizidae

The emberizids are a family of passerine birds. They are seed-eating birds with distinctively shaped bills.

- Reed bunting, Emberiza schoeniclus (A)
- Rustic bunting, Emberiza rustica (A)

== New World sparrows ==
Order: Passeriformes Family: Passerellidae

Until 2017, these species were considered part of the family Emberizidae. Most of the species are known as sparrows, but these birds are not closely related to the Old World sparrows which are in the family Passeridae. Many of these have distinctive head patterns.

- Dark-eyed junco, Junco hyemalis (A)
- White-crowned sparrow, Zonotrichia leucophrys (A)
- White-throated sparrow, Zonotrichia albicollis (A)
- Savannah sparrow, Passerculus sandwichensis (A)
- Lincoln's sparrow, Melospiza lincolnii (A)

== Troupials and allies ==
Order: Passeriformes Family: Icteridae

The icterids are a group of small to medium-sized, often colorful passerine birds restricted to the New World and include the grackles, New World blackbirds, and New World orioles. Most species have black as a predominant plumage color, often enlivened by yellow, orange, or red.

- Bobolink, Dolichonyx oryzivorus (A)
- Baltimore oriole, Icterus galbula (A)

== New World warblers ==
Order: Passeriformes Family: Parulidae

A group of small, often colourful passerine birds restricted to the New World. Most are arboreal and insectivorous.

- Ovenbird, Seiurus aurocapilla (A)
- Northern waterthrush, Parkesia noveboracensis (A)
- Golden-winged warbler, Vermivora chrysoptera (A)
- Blue-winged warbler, Vermivora cyanoptera (A)
- Black-and-white warbler, Mniotilta varia (A)
- Prothonotary warbler, Protonotaria citrea (A)
- Tennessee warbler, Leiothlypis peregrina (A)
- Connecticut warbler, Oporornis agilis (A)
- Common yellowthroat, Geothlypis trichas (A)
- Hooded warbler, Setophaga citrina (A)
- American redstart, Setophaga ruticilla (A)
- Cape May warbler, Setophaga tigrina (A)
- Northern parula, Setophaga americana (A)
- Magnolia warbler, Setophaga magnolia (A)
- Bay-breasted warbler, Setophaga castanea (A)
- Blackburnian warbler, Setophaga fusca (A)
- Yellow warbler, Setophaga petechia (A)
- Chestnut-sided warbler, Setophaga pensylvanica (A)
- Blackpoll warbler, Setophaga striata (A)
- Black-throated blue warbler, Setophaga caerulescens (A)
- Yellow-rumped warbler, Setophaga coronata (A)
- Yellow-throated warbler, Setophaga dominica (A)
- Prairie warbler, Setophaga discolor (A)
- Black-throated green warbler, Setophaga virens (A)
- Canada warbler, Cardellina canadensis (A)
- Wilson's warbler, Cardellina pusilla (A)

== Cardinals and allies ==
Order: Passeriformes Family: Cardinalidae

The cardinals are a family of robust, seed-eating birds with strong bills. They are typically associated with open woodland. The sexes usually have distinct plumages.

- Summer tanager, Piranga rubra (A)
- Scarlet tanager, Piranga olivacea (A)
- Rose-breasted grosbeak, Pheucticus ludovicianus (A)
- Blue grosbeak, Passerina caerulea (A)
- Indigo bunting, Passerina cyanea (A)
- Dickcissel, Spiza americana (A)

== See also ==
- List of birds of Portugal
- List of birds
- Lists of birds by region
- List of mammals of the Azores
- List of reptiles of the Azores
- List of amphibians of the Azores
