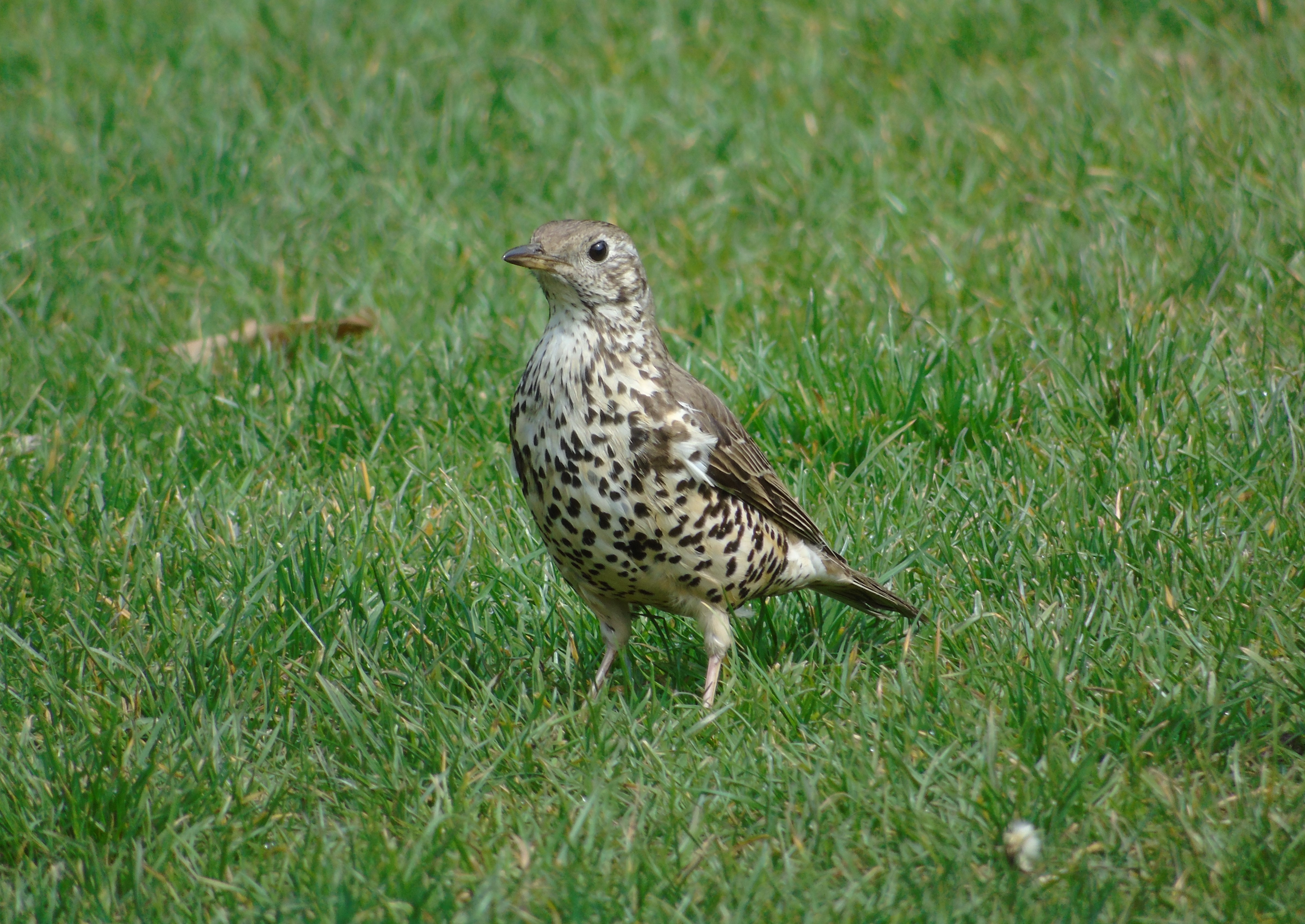
- Nominate T. v. viscivorus in Cardiff, Wales

Conservation status
- Least Concern (IUCN 3.1)

Scientific classification
- Kingdom: Animalia
- Phylum: Chordata
- Class: Aves
- Order: Passeriformes
- Family: Turdidae
- Genus: Turdus
- Species: T. viscivorus

Binomial name
- Turdus viscivorus Linnaeus, 1758
- Range of T. viscivorus Breeding Resident Non-breeding

Audio
- Song recorded in West Sussex, England

= Mistle thrush =

Mistle thrush Temporal range: Zanclean–present (Note: Fossil remains are known from between 5.33 and 0.01 million years ago.)

Bird in the family Turdidae from Europe, Asia and North Africa

The mistle thrush (Turdus viscivorus) is a bird common to much of Europe, temperate Asia and North Africa. It is a year-round resident in a large part of its range, but northern and eastern populations migrate south for the winter, often in small flocks. It is a large thrush with pale grey-brown upper parts, a greyish-white chin and throat, and black spots on its pale yellow and off-white under parts. The sexes are similar in plumage, and its three subspecies show only minimal differences. The male has a loud, far-carrying song which is delivered even in wet and windy weather, earning the bird the old name of stormcock. Historically, the name was also sometimes spelled "missel thrush".

Found in open woods, parks, hedges and cultivated land, the mistle thrush feeds on a wide variety of invertebrates, seeds and berries. Its preferred fruit include those of mistletoe, holly, rowan, and yew. Mistletoe is favoured where it is available, and this is reflected in the thrush's English and scientific names; the plant, a parasitic species, benefits from its seeds being excreted by the thrush onto branches where they can germinate. In winter, a mistle thrush will vigorously defend mistletoe clumps or other fruit-bearing trees as a food reserve for when times are hard, chasing off other thrushes and other fruit-eating birds like waxwings.

The open cup nest is built against a trunk or in a forked branch, and is fearlessly defended against potential predators, sometimes including humans or cats. The clutch, typically of three to five eggs, is incubated for 12–15 days, mainly by the female. The chicks fledge about 14–16 days after hatching. There are normally two broods. There was a range expansion in the 18th and early 19th centuries, and a small decline in recent decades, perhaps due to changes in agricultural practices. Given its numbers and large range, this thrush is classified by the International Union for Conservation of Nature as being of least concern.

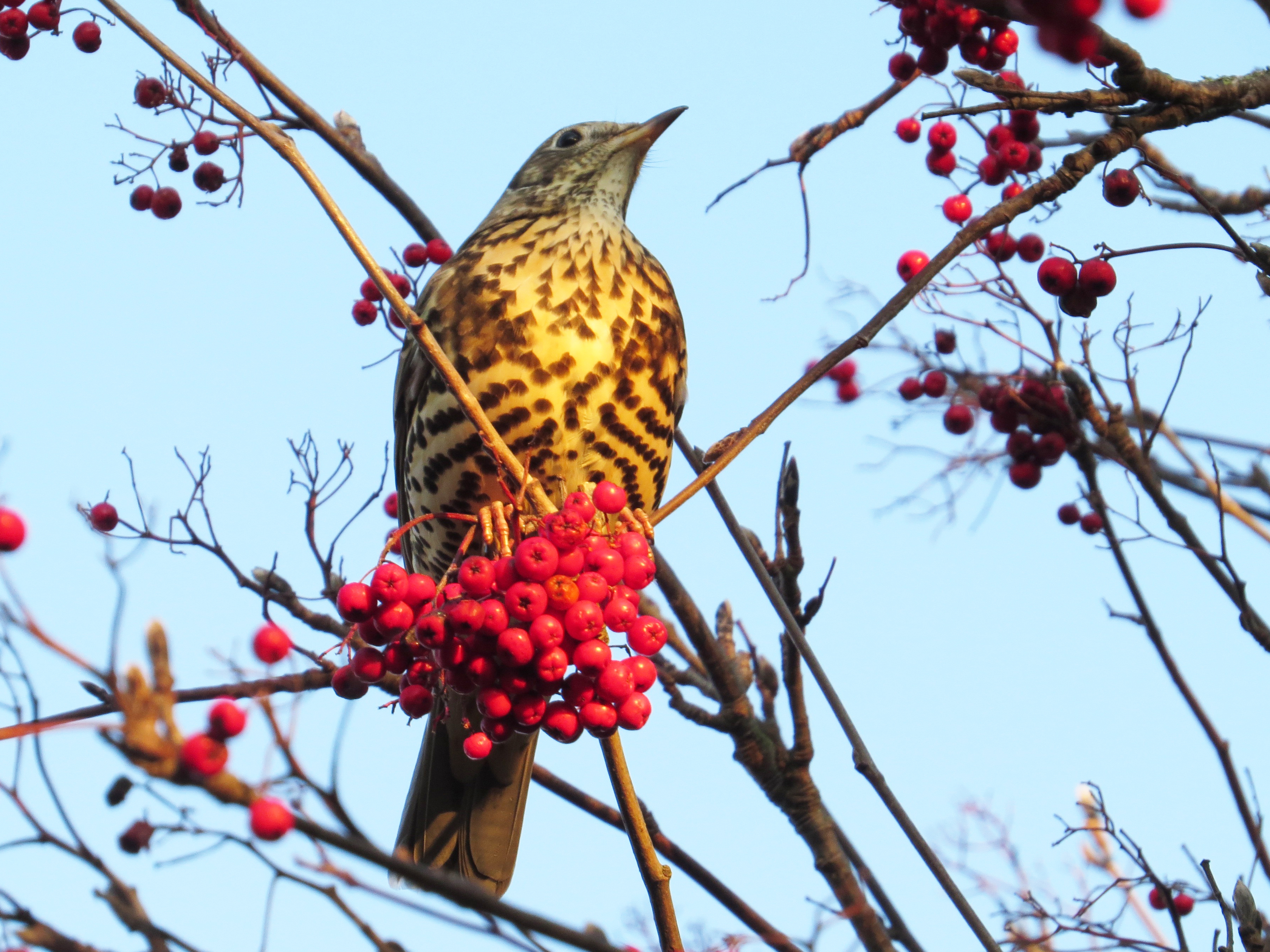
Mistle thrush defending berries in a rowan tree

== Taxonomy ==
The mistle thrush was first described by Carl Linnaeus in his 1758 10th edition of Systema Naturae under its current scientific name. Turdus is the Latin for "thrush", and viscivorus, "mistletoe eater", comes from viscum "mistletoe" and vorare, "to devour". The bird's liking for mistletoe berries is also indicated by its English name, "mistle" being an old name for the plant.

There are more than 60 species of medium to large thrushes in the genus Turdus, characterised by rounded heads, longish pointed wings, and usually melodious songs. A mitochondrial DNA study identified the mistle thrush's closest relatives as the similarly plumaged song and Chinese thrushes; these three species are early offshoots from the Eurasian lineage of Turdus thrushes after they spread north from Africa. They are less closely related to other European thrush species such as the blackbird (T. merula) which are descended from ancestors that had colonised the Canary Islands from Africa and subsequently reached Europe from there.

At least eight subspecies have been proposed, but the differences between them are mainly clinal, with birds being paler and less densely spotted in the east of the range. The accepted subspecies as of 2024 are:

- T. v. viscivorus, named by Linnaeus, 1758, the nominate subspecies. Europe, and western Asia east to western Siberia and southeast to northern Iran.
- T. v. bonapartei, Cabanis, 1860. Central Asia, south to northern Pakistan, northwestern India, and western Nepal.
- T. v. deichleri, Erlanger, 1897. Northwest Africa, Corsica, Sardinia.

There is some dispute as to the boundary between T. v. viscivorus and T. v. bonapartei; some cite birds from Siberia east of the Ob as being in T. v. bonapartei, while others restrict T. v. bonapartei to the populations further south in the mountains of central Asia, with the entire Siberian population in T. v. viscivorus. An isolated population in Crimea has sometimes been separated as T. v. tauricus, but this is not considered to be a valid form. Mistle thrush fossils have been found in Pleistocene deposits from Poland and Sicily.

== Description ==
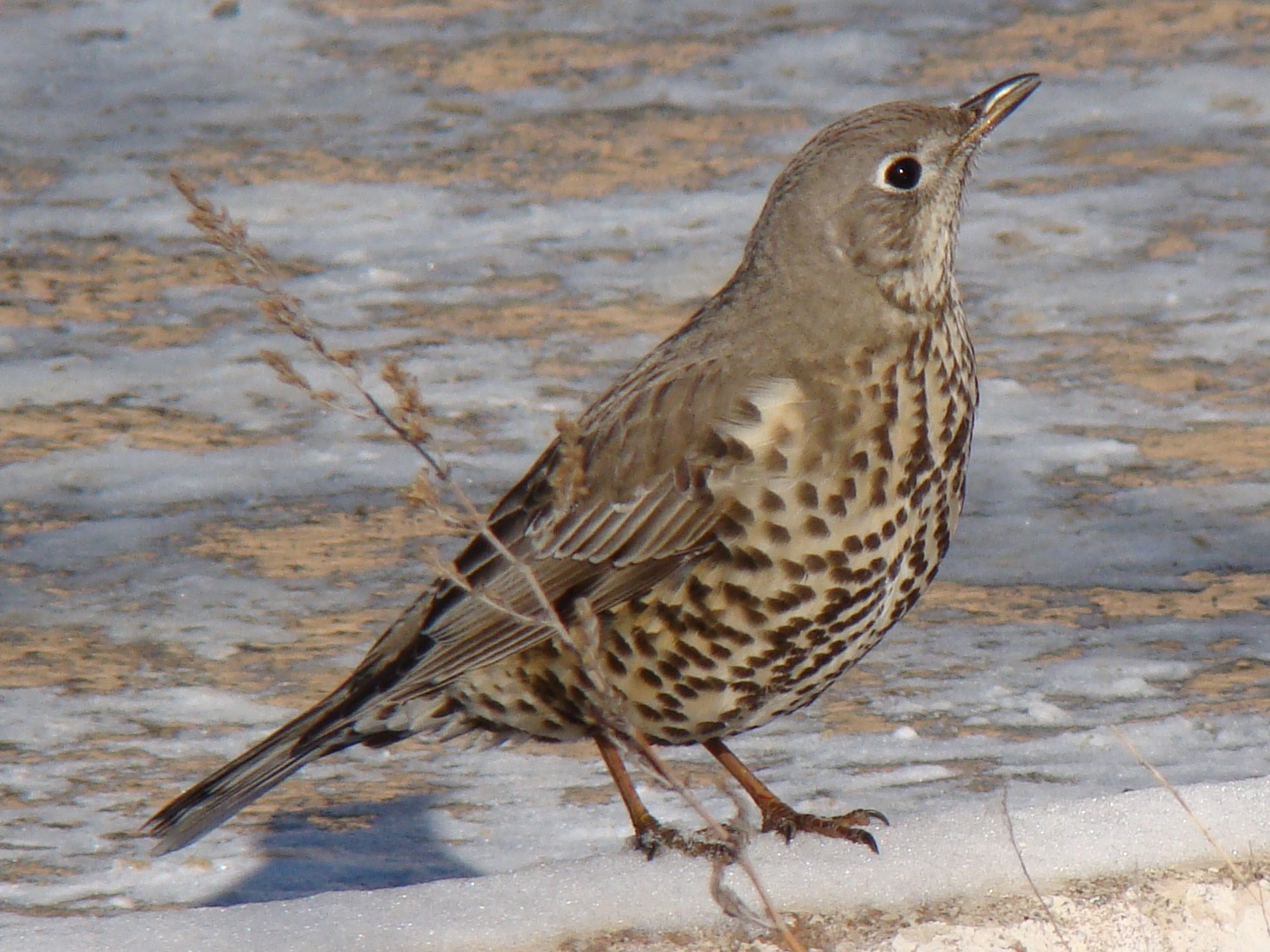
In Baikonur, Kazakhstan

The mistle thrush is the largest thrush native to Europe. The nominate subspecies measures 27–28 cm (11–11 in) in length, with a 45 cm (18 in) wingspan. It weighs 93 to 167 g (3.3 to 5.9 oz), with an average of around 130 g (4.6 oz). It has a stocky upright posture when on the ground. It has pale grey-brown upperparts, the chin and throat are greyish-white, and the yellowish-buff breast and off-white belly are marked with round black spots. The spotting becomes denser on the lower chest. The long tail has white tips on the outer feathers, and the underwing coverts are white. The eyes are dark brown and the bill is blackish with a yellowish base to the lower mandible. The legs and feet are yellowish-brown. There are no plumage differences between the sexes. Juveniles are similar to adults, but they have paler upperparts with creamy 'teardrop' centres to many of the feathers and smaller spots on the yellowish underparts. By their first winter they are very similar to adults, but the underparts are usually more buff-toned.

There is clinal variation in nominate T. v. viscivorus across its range with the darkest birds in western Europe, and the palest in Siberia and Turkey. The southeastern subspecies T. v. bonapartei is 30 cm (12 in) in length, and therefore slightly larger than the nominate form. It is paler grey above and whiter below, with fewer black spots. The southwestern subspecies T. v. deichleri resembles T. v. bonapartei in appearance, but is closer in size to the nominate T. v. viscivorus, although it has a more slender bill.

Adults have a full moult after breeding, beginning between late May and the end of June, and completed by early October. Juvenile birds have a partial moult, replacing their head, body, and covert feathers; this is completed by October, although the start of the moult depends on when the chicks hatched.

The mistle thrush is much larger, paler and longer-tailed than the sympatric song thrush. In the western Himalayas it could be confused with both the plain-backed and the long-tailed thrushes. These are similar to the mistle thrush, but the plain–backed thrush lacks obvious wing bars, is more rufous above than its relative, and is barred rather than spotted below. The long-tailed thrush has olive-toned upperparts, bars on its breast and two wing bars. Juvenile mistle thrushes are superficially similar to White's thrush, but that species has golden-yellow plumage, scalloped underparts and a distinctive underwing pattern.

=== Voice ===
The male mistle thrush has a loud melodious song with fluted whistles, sounding like chewee-trewuu ... trureetruuruu or similar, repeated three to six times, and used to advertise his territory, attract a mate and maintain the pair bond. The tone resembles that of the song thrush or blackbird, but compared to its relatives the mistle thrush's repertoire is less varied and the delivery is slower. The song is, however, much louder, often audible up to 2 km (2,000 yd) away. The song is given from a treetop or other elevated position mainly from November to early June. The male is most vocal in the early morning, and its tendency to sing after, and sometimes during, wet and windy weather led to the old name "stormcock". The song may be heard in any month, although it is uncommon from July to August while the thrush is moulting. The main call, given by both sexes, is a dry chattering krrrr, louder when it is alarmed or excited. It is often likened to the sound of a football rattle, a form of musical ratchet. There is also a squeaky tuk contact call.

== Distribution and habitat ==
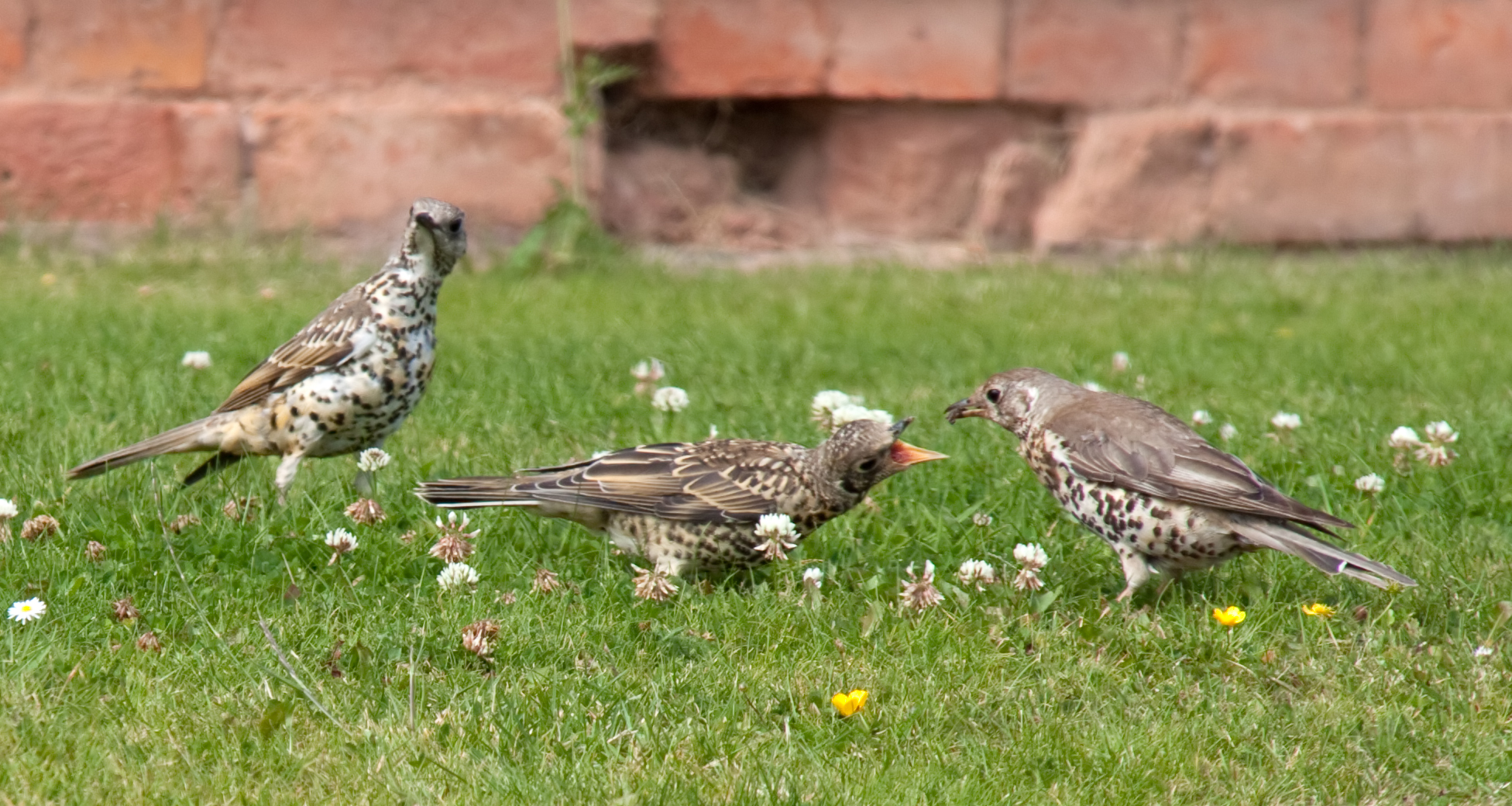
An adult (right) with two juveniles feeding on a lawn

The mistle thrush breeds in much of Europe and temperate Asia, although it is absent from the treeless far north, and its range becomes discontinuous in southeast Europe, Turkey and the Middle East. In these warmer southern areas, it tends to be found in the milder uplands and coastal regions.

The mistle thrush is a partial migrant: birds from the north and east of the range wintering in the milder areas of Europe and North Africa. Scandinavian and Russian birds start moving south from mid-September onwards, most birds wintering in Europe, western Turkey and the Middle East. Between mid-October and November, large numbers cross the Strait of Gibraltar and others pass through Cyprus, but there is hardly any migration across the North Sea. Breeding birds in the British Isles and north-west Europe are resident or move only short distances. In the Himalayas, the breeding population moves to nearby lower-altitude sites in winter. Return migration starts mainly from late March, although it can be a month earlier in the Middle East, and northern breeders may not arrive back on their territories until late April or early May. Migration may be by day or night, and typically involves individuals or small groups. Vagrant birds have occurred in the Azores, China, Crete, Faroe Islands, Iceland, Japan, Oman, Saudi Arabia, Sikkim and the United Arab Emirates. In the winter 2017/2018 the first record of a mistle thrush in North America was at Miramichi in New Brunswick, found on 9 December 2017 and remaining until 24 March 2018.

The mistle thrush is found in a wide range of habitats containing trees, including forests, plantations, hedges and town parks. In the south and east of its range, it inhabits upland coniferous woodland and the range extends above the main tree line where dwarf juniper is present. Breeding occurs at up to 600 m (2,000 ft) in the mountains of North Africa, and occasionally much higher, to 1,700 m (5,600 ft). In the highlands of Europe, its preferred altitude is from 800–1,800 m (2,600–5,900 ft). More open habitats, such as agricultural land, moors and grassy hills, are extensively used in winter or on migration.

There is evidence that this species has changed its natural habitat in at least parts of its range. In Germany and elsewhere in central Europe, it was found only in coniferous forest until the mid-1920s when its range rapidly expanded, first into farmland, and then to suburbs and urban parks. The reasons for this expansion are unclear. In areas of intensive farming, such as eastern England, arable land has in turn largely been abandoned in favour of built-up areas with their greater variety of green habitats.

== Behaviour ==
Mistle thrushes are found as individuals or pairs for much of the year, although families forage together in late summer, and groups may merge to form large flocks when food sources are plentiful. It is not uncommon for up to 50 thrushes to feed together at that time of year. They roost at night in trees or bushes, again typically as individuals or pairs, except in late summer or autumn when families may roost together.

The mistle thrush is quite terrestrial, hopping with its head held up and body erect; when excited, it will flick its wings and tail. The flight consists of undulating bounds interspersed with glides.

=== Breeding ===
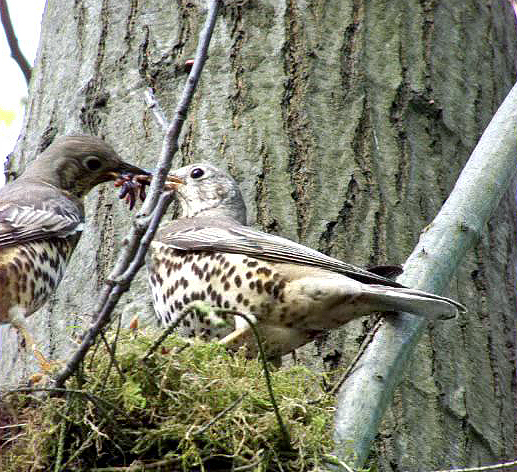
Male (left) passing earthworms to female on nest

Mistle thrushes breed in the year subsequent to their hatching; they are monogamous and stay as a pair throughout the year in areas where they are not migratory. Their territories are much larger than those of blackbirds or song thrushes; although the nest territory is only about 0.6 hectares (1.5 acres), around 15–17 ha (37–42 acres) is used for feeding. Territories are normally reoccupied in subsequent years. Territories are larger in woods than in farmland. The male will attack intruders into its breeding area, including birds of prey and corvids, and sometimes cats or humans. Courtship feeding of the female by her partner has sometimes been observed. Breeding typically commences in mid-March in the south and west of Europe (late February in Britain), but not till early May in Finland. The nest is usually built in a tree in the fork of a branch or against the trunk, although hedges, ledges on buildings and cliff faces may also be used. The nest site may be up to 20 m (66 ft) above the ground, although 2–9 m (6.6–29.5 ft) is more typical. The common chaffinch often nests close to a mistle thrush, the vigilance of the chaffinch and the aggressive behaviour of the thrush benefiting both species. The thrush's nest is a large cup of sticks, dry grass, roots and moss, coated on the inside with a layer of mud and lined with fine grass and leaves. The nest is built by the female, although the male may help. Nests built early in the breeding season may be destroyed by bad weather.

The clutch is typically three to five eggs (range two to six), which are usually whitish-buff or greenish-blue and are spotted with red, purple or brown. The average size of the egg is 30 mm × 22 mm (1.18 in × 0.87 in), and weighs 7.8 g (0.28 oz), of which 6% is shell. The eggs are incubated for 12–15 days, mainly by the female. The chicks are altricial and downy, and are fed by both parents. They fledge about 14–16 days after hatching. There are normally two broods, except in Siberia, where there is only one, the male feeding the fledglings from the first brood while the female sits on the second clutch. Sometimes the same nest is reused for both broods. The young are dependent on their parents for 15–20 days after fledging.

In a study carried out in Britain, the survival rate for juveniles in their first year is 57 per cent, and the adult annual survival rate is 62 per cent. Life expectancy is typically three years, but the maximum age recorded from bird ringing recoveries is 21 years and 3 months for a bird shot in Switzerland.

=== Feeding ===
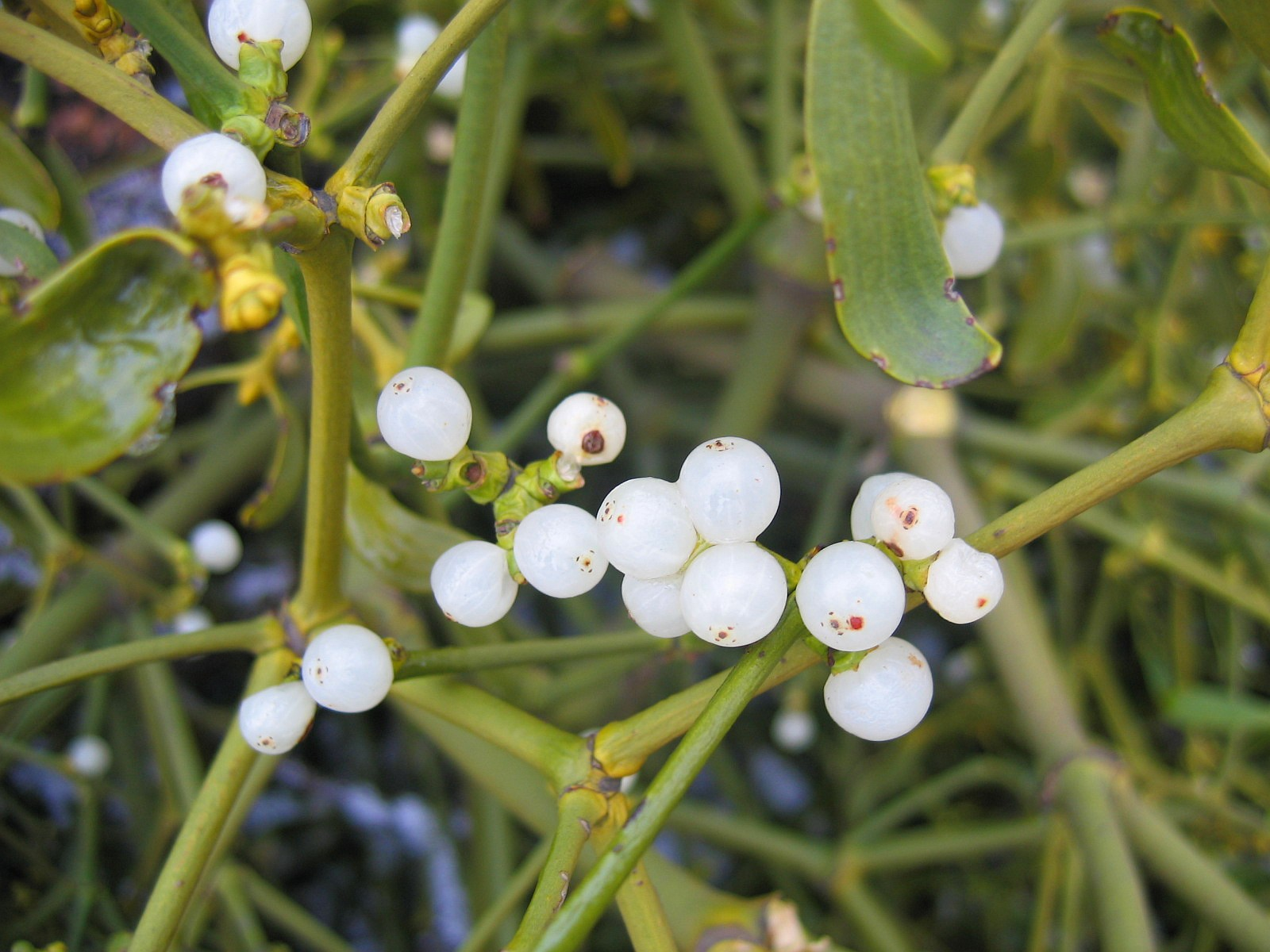
The mistle thrush derives its English and scientific names from mistletoe, a favourite food.

Mistle thrushes feed mainly on invertebrates, fruit and berries. Animal prey include earthworms, insects and other arthropods, slugs and snails. Snails are sometimes smashed on a stone "anvil", a technique also used by the song thrush. The mistle thrush has been known to kill slowworms and the young of the song thrush, blackbird and dunnock.

Plant food includes the fruits and seeds of bushes and trees, mainly holly, yew, rowan, ivy and mistletoe, but also, for example, blackberry, cotoneaster, crab apple, cherry, elder, hawthorn, olive, sea-buckthorn, and rose. It may eat the flowers and shoots of grasses and other plants, and will take fallen apples and plums. It forages within its breeding habitat and in open fields, sometimes sharing these feeding areas with redwings, fieldfares, and ring ouzels.

Young birds are initially mainly fed on invertebrates, often collected from low foliage or under bushes rather than in the grassland preferred by the adults. Adults will roam up to 1 km (approximately 1,100 yards) from the nest on pasture or ploughed land. After fledging the young may accompany their parents until the onset of winter. Individuals or pairs will defend one or more fruit-bearing trees throughout the winter, with preference shown for trees which host mistletoe, the parasitic plant from which the bird derives its name. Where mistletoe is not present, holly is the most common tree chosen. Although the thrush normally feeds on the ground and from low bushes, the defence of this resource conserves fruit for later in the season when other food items become scarce. The trees are defended against other thrushes as well as birds such as the bullfinch and great spotted woodpecker. In milder winters with an abundance of fruit, however, this strategy is less used and thrushes can be observed foraging in flocks. Conversely, in hard winters, the defender may be overwhelmed by large flocks of fieldfares, redwings or Bohemian waxwings.

As its name implies, the mistle thrush is important in propagating the mistletoe, an aerial plant parasite, which needs its seeds to be deposited on the branches of suitable trees. The highly nutritious fruits are favoured by the thrush, which digests the flesh leaving the sticky seeds to be excreted, possibly in a suitable location for germination.

== Predators and parasites ==
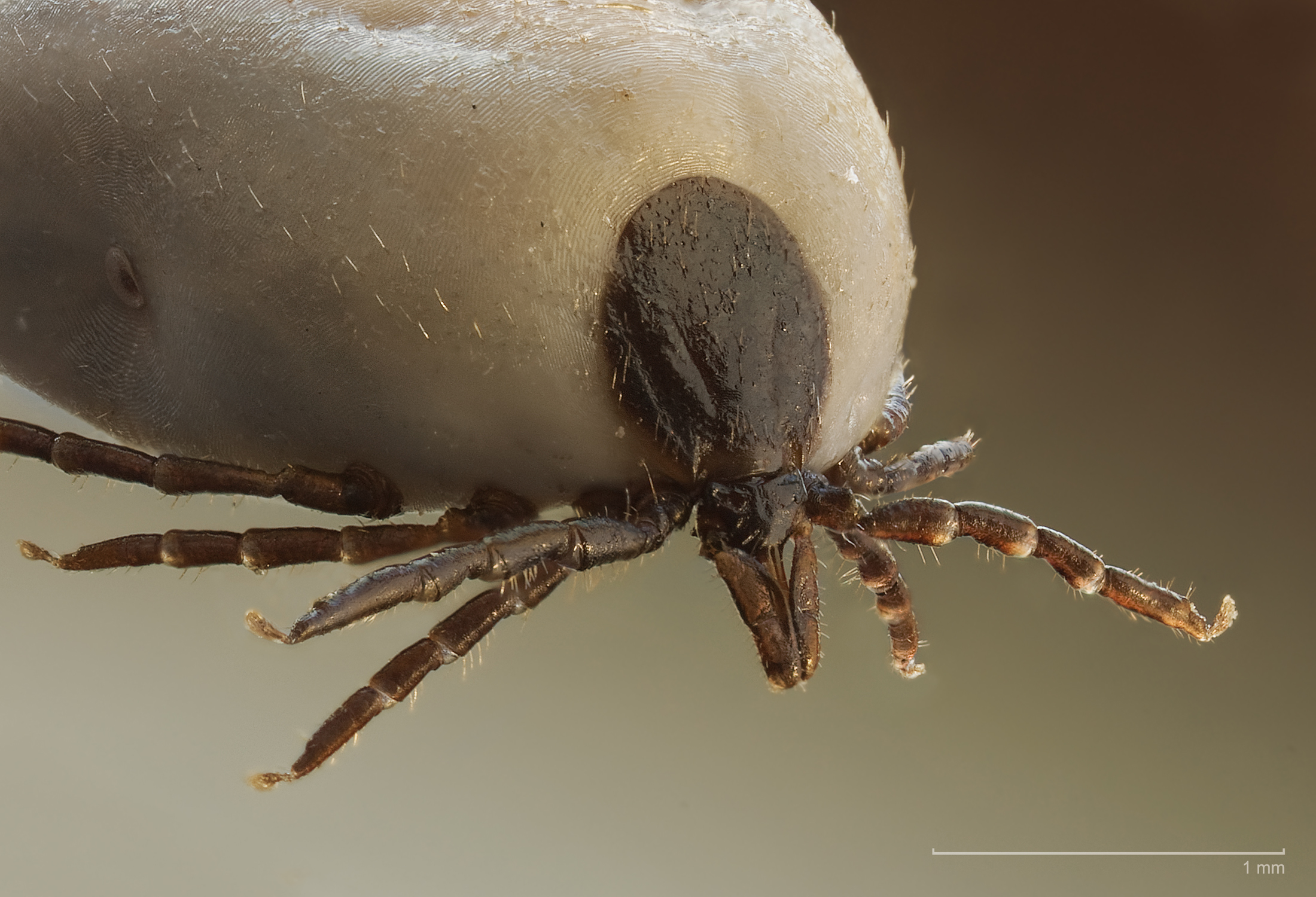
A castor bean tick swollen with the blood of its host

The mistle thrush is predated upon by a wide variety of birds of prey, including the boreal owl, short-eared owl, tawny owl, Ural owl, Eurasian eagle-owl, golden eagle, kestrel, common buzzard, red kite, northern goshawk, peregrine falcon, and sparrowhawk. The eggs and chicks may be targeted by cats and corvids. Parent birds exhibit fearlessness in defence of their nests, occasionally even attacking humans. The mistle thrush is not normally a host of the common cuckoo, a brood parasite.

External parasites of the mistle thrush include the hen flea, the moorhen flea, the castor bean tick and the brightly coloured harvest mite. Internally, they can suffer from parasites including tapeworm, nematodes, and Syngamus merulae (a species of Gapeworm). Blood parasites can include Trypanosoma and Plasmodium species.

== Status ==
The mistle thrush has an extensive distribution in Europe and western Asia, and its European breeding population is estimated at 9–22.2 million birds. When Asian breeders are added, this gives a global total of 12.2–44.4 million. The species was formerly more restricted in range, and rarely bred even in northern England in the 1700s. It expanded rapidly into lowland and coastal areas of Europe during the 18th century and the first half of the 19th century, colonising areas where it was formerly rare or absent, such as Ireland (where it first bred in 1807), Scotland and the Netherlands. The range also increased in Denmark, Norway, Hungary and Austria.

Although the population now appears to be declining, the decrease is not rapid or large enough to trigger international conservation vulnerability criteria. Given its high numbers and very large range, this thrush is therefore classified by the International Union for Conservation of Nature as being of least concern. The perceived decline may be due to the loss of invertebrate-rich pastures and mixed farms through conversion to arable agriculture or more intensively managed grassland. Adult survival, clutch size and fledging success are all lower in arable landscapes than in areas with extensive pasture. In Finland, the loss of ancient forests is thought to have led to a local decline. In Britain, a substantial decline led to its being added to the UK Red List of Species of Conservation Concern in 2015, with agricultural intensification implicated; between 1967–2022, the breeding population declined by 62%.

== In culture ==
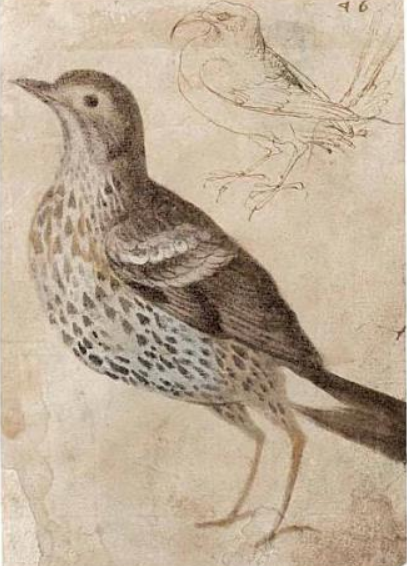
Mistle Thrush and Alpine Chough by Giovanni da Udine

Desiderius Erasmus's early sixteenth-century collection of Latin proverbs included Turdus malum sibi ipse cacat (the thrush himself excretes his own trouble), which refers to the use of the sticky mistletoe berries favoured by this species as an ingredient in birdlime, used to trap birds. The thrush was seen to be thus spreading the seeds of his own destruction.

Mistle Thrush and Alpine Chough, by Giovanni da Udine, an artist who worked in Raphael's studio in the 16th century, was a sketch for his Bird with Garland and Fruit, and this in turn was the basis for a Raphael fresco in the Apostolic Palace.

The early Renaissance poem "The Harmony of Birds" features a thrusshe (mistle thrush) singing the phrase "sanctus, sanctus", distinguishing the bird from the song thrush, the mauys or throstle. The song of the mistle thrush is also described in Thomas Hardy's "Darkling Thrush" and Edward Thomas's "The Thrush". The loud call of this common and conspicuous bird also led to many old or local names, including "screech", "shrite" and "gawthrush". Other names, including "stormcock" referred to its willingness to sing in wind and rain. "Holm thrush", "hollin cock" and "holm cock" are based on obsolete names for the holly tree, which may be defended by the thrush in winter for its berries.

In Frances Hodgson Burnett's 1911 novel The Secret Garden, Dickon reassures Mary Lennox that he will keep his knowledge of the garden secret by comparing her to a mistle thrush in defence of its nest, recognising his privilege in sharing her secret: "If tha' was a missel thrush an' showed me where thy nest was, does tha' think I'd tell any one? Not me," he said. "Tha' art as safe as a missel thrush."

Roy Harper's 1971 album Stormcock, featuring Jimmy Page, is titled after the species.

The final verse of the Jethro Tull song "Jack-in-the-Green" from their 1977 album Songs from the Wood mentions the bird in the lines "Oh, the mistlethrush is coming. Jack, put out the light." The bird also features in the lyrics of The Decemberists' song "Won't Want for Love (Margaret in the Taiga)" from their 2009 album The Hazards of Love: "Mistlethrush, Mistlethrush, Lay me down in the underbrush, My naked feet grow weary with the dusk".

== General bibliography ==
- Alsteens, Stijn (2009). Raphael to Renoir: Drawings from the Collection of Jean Bonna. New York: Metropolitan Museum of Art. (Catalogue for the Exhibition "Raphael to Renoir: Drawings from the Collection of Jean Bonna", held at The Metropolitan Museum of Art, New York, from 21 January to 26 April 2009, and at the National Gallery of Scotland, Edinburgh, from 5 June to 6 September 2009)
- Andrew, Malcolm (1985). Two Early Renaissance Bird Poems: The Harmony of Birds, The Parliament of Birds. Washington, DC: Folger Books. ISBN 978-0-918016-73-7.
- Armitage, Simon; Dee, Tim (2011). The Poetry of Birds. London: Penguin. ISBN 978-0-14-102711-1.
- Brown, Andy; Grice, Phil (2005). Birds in England (Poyser Country Avifaunas). London: Poyser. ISBN 978-0-7136-6530-7.
- Clement, Peter; Hathway, Ren; Wilczur, Jan (2000). Thrushes (Helm Identification Guides). London: Christopher Helm Publishers. ISBN 978-0-7136-3940-7.
- Cocker, Mark; Mabey, Richard (2005). Birds Britannica. London: Chatto & Windus. ISBN 978-0-7011-6907-7.
- Coward, Thomas Alfred (1928). The Birds of the British Isles and Their Eggs: volume 1 (3rd ed.). London: Frederick Warne. OCLC 4279233.
- Erasmus, Desiderius (1982). Mynors, R A B (ed.). Adages: Ii1 to Iv100 (Collected Works of Erasmus). Vol. 31. Translated by Phillips, Margaret Mann. Toronto: University of Toronto Press. ISBN 978-0-8020-2373-5.
- Fuller, Robert J (2003). Bird Life of Woodland and Forest. Cambridge: Cambridge University Press. ISBN 978-0-521-54347-7.
- Hersey, George L (1993). High Renaissance Art in St. Peter's and the Vatican: An Interpretive Guide. Chicago: University of Chicago Press. ISBN 978-0-226-32782-2.
- Jobling, James A (2010). The Helm Dictionary of Scientific Bird Names. London: Christopher Helm. ISBN 978-1-4081-2501-4.
- Kenward, Robert (2010). The Goshawk (Poyser monographs). London: Poyser. ISBN 978-1-4081-2826-8.
- Korpimäki, Erkki; Hakkarainen, Harri (2012). The Boreal Owl: Ecology, Behaviour and Conservation of a Forest-Dwelling Predator. Cambridge: Cambridge University Press. ISBN 978-0-521-11371-7.
- Linnaeus, Carl (1758). Systema naturae per regna tria naturae, secundum classes, ordines, genera, species, cum characteribus, differentiis, synonymis, locis. Tomus I. Editio decima, reformata (in Latin). Holmiae: Laurentii Salvii.
- Lockwood, William Burley (1984). Oxford Book of British Bird Names. Oxford: Oxford University Press. ISBN 978-0-19-214155-2.
- Newton, Ian (2010) [1986]. The Sparrowhawk (Poyser monographs). London: Poyser. ISBN 978-1-4081-3834-2.
- Percy Society; Collier, John Payne; Skelton, John; Smith, Goldwin (1842). The Harmony of Birds. London: Percy Society.
- Ratcliffe, Derek (2010). The Peregrine Falcon (Poyser monographs). London: Poyser. ISBN 978-1-4081-3683-6.
- Rothschild, Miriam; Clay, Theresa (1953). Fleas, Flukes and Cuckoos: A study of bird parasites. London: Collins.
- Snow, Barbara; Snow, David (2010). Birds and Berries (Poyser Monographs). London: Poyser. ISBN 978-1-4081-3821-2.
- Snow, David; Perrins, Christopher M, eds. (1998). The Birds of the Western Palearctic concise edition (2 volumes). Oxford: Oxford University Press. ISBN 978-0-19-854099-1.
- Swainson, Rev. Charles Anthony (1886). The folk lore and provincial names of British birds. London: Elliot Stock. OL 6304710M.
- Watson, Jeff (2010). The Golden Eagle (Poyser monographs). London: Poyser. ISBN 978-1-4081-3455-9.
