= Hen flea =

Hen flea is a common name for several insects and may refer to:

- Ceratophyllus gallinae, also known as the European chicken flea
- Echidnophaga gallinacea, also known as the sticktight flea
