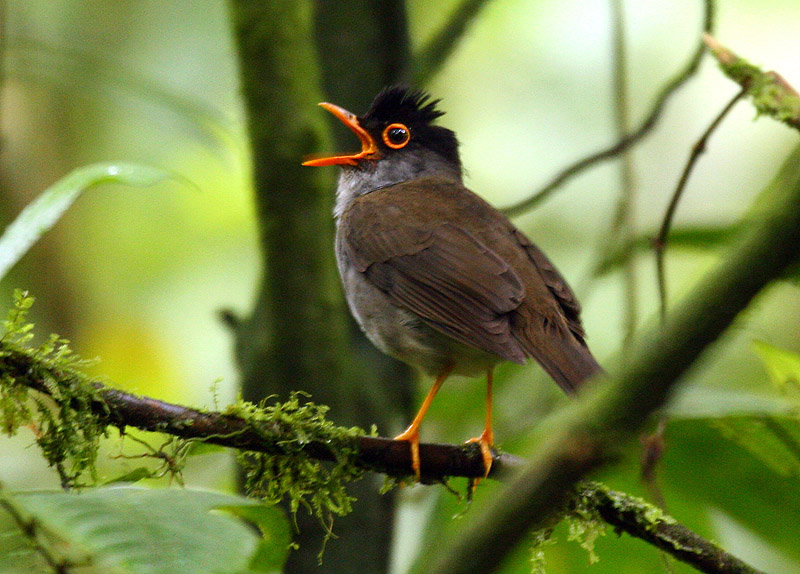

Conservation status
- Least Concern (IUCN 3.1)

Scientific classification
- Kingdom: Animalia
- Phylum: Chordata
- Class: Aves
- Order: Passeriformes
- Family: Turdidae
- Genus: Catharus
- Species: C. mexicanus

Binomial name
- Catharus mexicanus (Bonaparte, 1856)

= Black-headed nightingale-thrush =

Species of bird

The black-headed nightingale-thrush (Catharus mexicanus) is a species of bird in the family Turdidae, the thrushes and allies. It is found in Costa Rica, Guatemala, Honduras, Mexico, Nicaragua, and Panama. It has also been recorded as a vagrant in Texas.

== Taxonomy and systematics ==
The black-headed nightingale-thrush was originally described in 1856 by Charles Lucien Bonaparte as Malacocychla mexicana. It was later reassigned to its present genus Catharus that had been erected in 1850. Bonaparte had noted the specie's resemblance to members of Catharus.

The black-headed nightingale's further taxonomy is unsettled. The IOC, AviList, and BirdLife International's Handbook of the Birds of the World assign it these four subspecies:

- C. m. mexicanus (Bonaparte, 1856)
- C. m. cantator Griscom, 1930
- C. m. yaegeri Phillips, AR, 1991
- C. m. carrikeri Phillips, AR, 1991

The Clements taxonomy does not recognize C. m. yaegeri and C. m. carrikeri. It includes C. m. yaegeri in C. m. cantator and retains the earlier binomial of C. m. fumosus (Ridgway, 1888) for C. m. carrikeri.

This article follows the four-subspecies model.

== Description ==
The black-headed nightingale-thrush is 15 to 16.5 cm (5.9 to 6.5 in) long and weighs about 30 g (1.1 oz). Adult males of the nominate subspecies C. m. mexicanus have a black crown and a dark gray face with a bright orange eye-ring. Their upperparts are olive-brown. Their throat is white with faint dark streaks, their breast and flanks pale grayish brown, and their belly and vent white. Adult females are similar to males but have a browner head and breast. Subspecies C. m. cantator is slightly smaller than the nominate with a much grayer face and throat and an olive wash on the breast. C. m. yaegeri has a strong rufescent wash on the back. C. m. carrikeri has dark ruddy tones on their upperparts and the darkest gray underparts of all the subspecies. All subspecies have bright orange bills, legs, and feet.

== Distribution and habitat ==
The black-headed nightingale-thrush has a disjunct distribution. The subspecies are found thus:

- C. m. mexicanus: east-central Mexico from Tamaulipas to Veracruz and western Chiapas
- C. m. cantator: from Chiapas to eastern Guatemala
- C. m. yaegeri: Honduras
- C. m. carrikeri: from Nicaragua through Costa Rica into western Panama to Veraguas Province

An individual of C. m. mexicanus spent much of 2004 in Hidalgo County, Texas.

The black-headed nightingale-thrush primarily inhabits lowland and montane evergreen forest in the tropical and subtropical zones. In Guatemala and Honduras it also occurs in pine-oak forest. Sources differ on its overall elevational range. One states it as 600 to 1,800 m (2,000 to 5,900 ft) and another as 750 to 1,800 m (2,500 to 5,900 ft). The latter is stated as the species' elevational range in Guatemala and Honduras. A field guide to Costa Rican birds places it between 300 and 1,000 m (1,000 and 3,300 ft) on the Caribbean slope and between 700 and 1,300 m (2,300 and 4,300 ft) on the Pacific slope.

== Behavior ==
=== Movement ===
The black-headed nightingale-thrush is mostly a year-round resident. There is evidence that individuals in the far northern part of the species' range move south for the winter, and there are also elevational movements in Veracruz.

=== Feeding ===
The black-headed nightingale-thrush feeds on insects such as beetles and caterpillars. It also eats much fruit; that of Psychotria and Cephaelis have been noted. It forages in the forest understory and on the ground, where it flips over leaf litter.

=== Breeding ===
The black-headed nightingale-thrush's breeding season has not been fully defined but includes April and May in Mexico and March to July in Costa Rica. It makes a large cup nest from mosses, strips of bark, and rootlets lined with finer plant material. It is typically placed in a fork in an understory plant between about 1 and 3 m (3 and 10 ft) above the ground, and often by a stream. The clutch is two or three eggs that are pinkish white to bluish white with reddish brown speckles. The incubation period, time to fledging, and details of parental care are not known.

=== Other ===
It is aggressive when interacting with ruddy-capped nightingale-thrushes (C. frantzii).

=== Vocalization ===
The black-headed nightingale-thrush sings mostly at dawn, dusk, and in the afternoon. Its song is "a series of rapid, thin, flute-like but slightly tinny, fuzzy phrases...e.g. dleet-dloo-dlee-dlee". Its calls include a "harsh complaining upslurred mew, rreahr, meahh or dzeeeet", a "hard dry rattle or trill when agitated", a "soft blurred pseeer", a "slow plaintive chowrr", "grrr", and "meww".

== Status ==
The IUCN has assessed the black-headed nightingale-thrush as being of Least Concern. It has a large range; its population size is not known and is believed to be decreasing. No immediate threats have been identified. It is considered common in Oaxaca and locally fairly common in Panama. It is rare and local in Guatemala and common in Honduras. It is common on the Caribbean slope of Costa Rica and uncommon on the Pacific slope.
