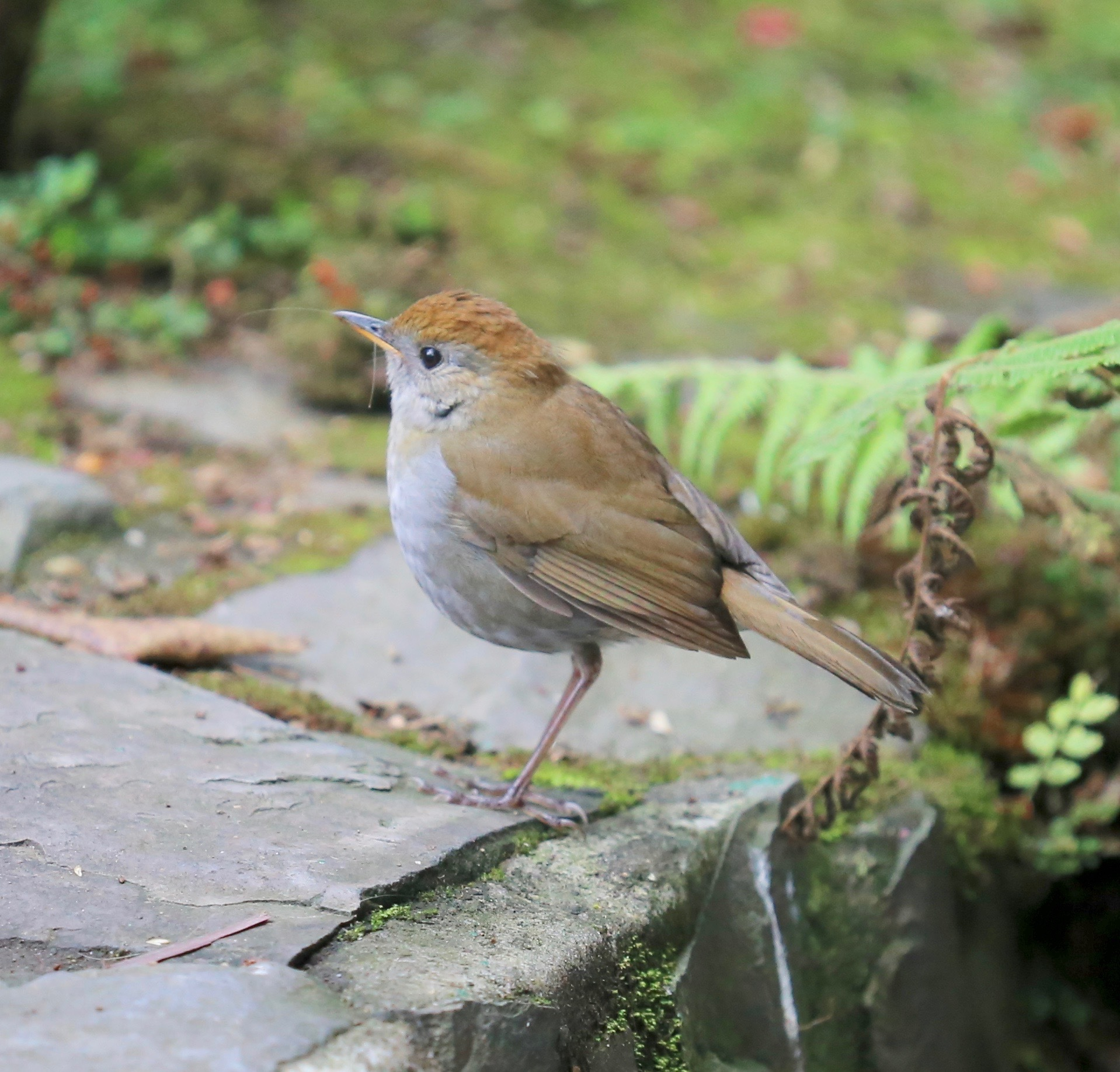

Conservation status
- Least Concern (IUCN 3.1)

Scientific classification
- Kingdom: Animalia
- Phylum: Chordata
- Class: Aves
- Order: Passeriformes
- Family: Turdidae
- Genus: Catharus
- Species: C. frantzii

Binomial name
- Catharus frantzii Cabanis, 1861

= Ruddy-capped nightingale-thrush =

Species of bird

The ruddy-capped nightingale-thrush (Catharus frantzii) is a species of bird in the family Turdidae, the thrushes and allies. It is found from Mexico to Panama.

== Taxonomy and systematics ==
The ruddy-capped nightingale-thrush was originally described by German ornithologist Jean Cabanis in 1861 with its current binomial Catharus frantzii. Its specific epithet commemorates the German naturalist Alexander von Frantzius. Its closest living relatives appear to be the North American species complex containing the veery (C. fuscescens) and the gray-cheeked thrush (C. minimus).

Though the ruddy-capped nightingale-thrush was described as a species, for much of the twentieth century it was treated as a subspecies of the russet nightingale-thrush (C. occidentalis). The two are sister species.

The ruddy-capped nightingale-thrush's further taxonomy is unsettled. The IOC, AviList, and BirdLife International's Handbook of the Birds of the World (HBW) assign it these eight subspecies:

- C. f. omiltemensis Ridgway, 1905
- C. f. nelsoni Phillips, AR, 1969
- C. f. chiapensis Phillips, AR, 1969
- C. f. alticola Salvin & Godman, 1879
- C. f. juancitonis Stone, 1931
- C. f. waldroni Phillips, AR, 1969
- C. f. frantzii Cabanis, 1861
- C. f. wetmorei Phillips, AR, 1969

The Clements taxonomy does not recognize C. f. omiltemensis and C. f. alticola but does recognize C. f. confusus (Philips, 1969) that the other systems do not.

Some authors have suggested that several of the subspecies should be treated as full species.

This article follows the IOC/AviList/HBW eight-subspecies model.

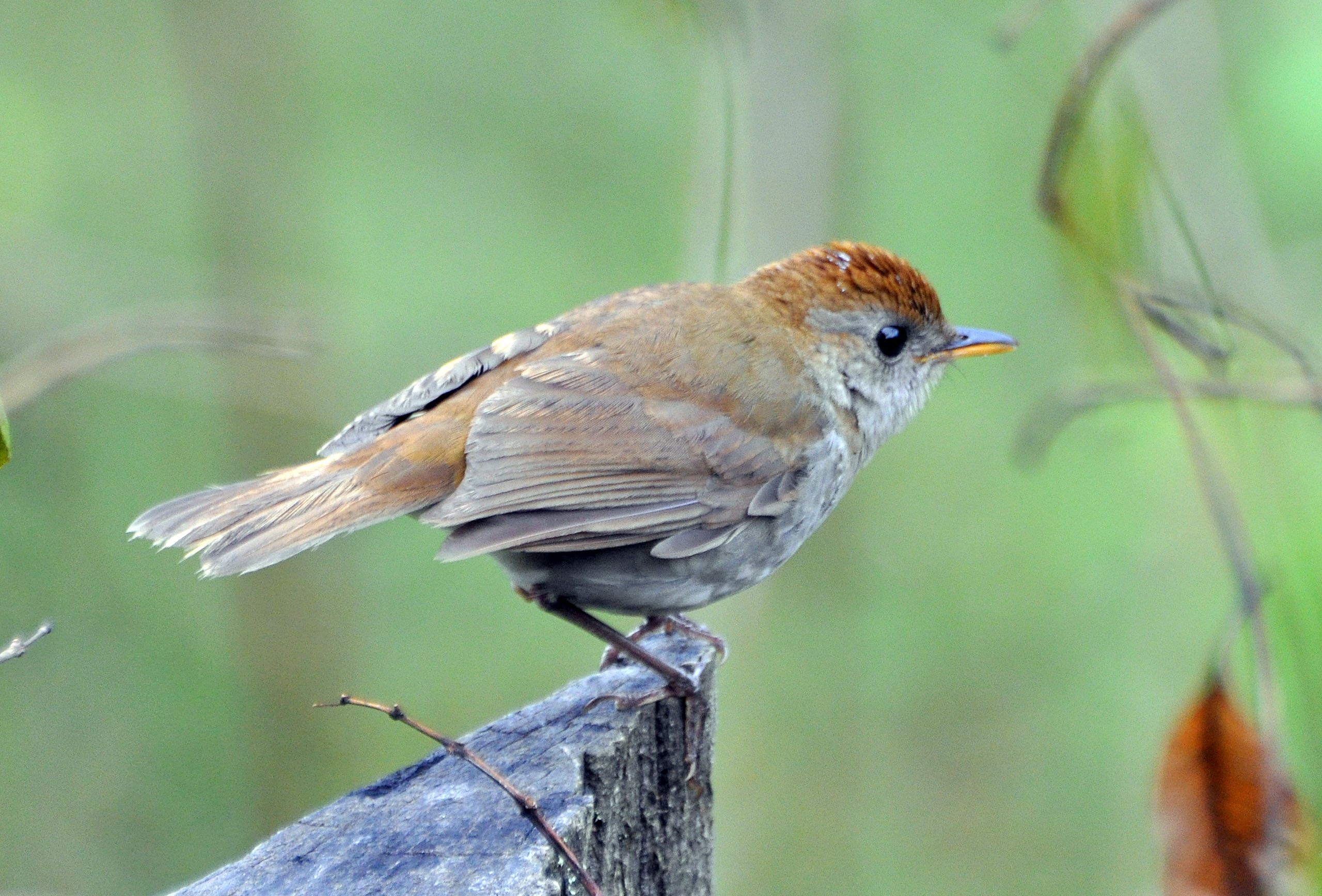
Ruddy-capped nightingale-thrush in Savegre Valley, Costa Rica

== Description ==
The ruddy-capped nightingale-thrush is about 15 to 18 cm (5.9 to 7.1 in) long and weighs about 30 g (1.1 oz). The sexes have the same plumage. Adults of the nominate subspecies C. f. frantzii have a rich rufous-brown to russet crown and a grayish face that sometimes has an olive tinge. Their back and rump are brownish olive with a russet wash and their uppertail coverts are deep rufous-brown. Their wings are mostly the same color as the back and rump but with silvery white undersides on the flight feathers. Their tail is deep rufous-brown. Their chin and throat are whitish with dark flecks. Their breast is pale gray with an olive tinge and dark flecks. Their belly, vent, and undertail coverts are whitish. Juveniles have a dark olive-brown to reddish brown crown and upperparts. Their face is sootier than adults'. Their breast is olive with darker feather tips. Their lower breast, belly, and flanks are whitish with olive or olive-brown bars.

The other subspecies of the ruddy-capped nightingale-thrush differ from the nominate and each other thus:

- C. f. omiltemensis: duller upperparts and whiter underparts than nominate
- C. f. nelsoni: like nominate with a brownish wash on the breast
- C. f. chiapensis: like omiltemensis with a slightly darker tail and uppertail coverts
- C. f. alticola: grayer underparts than nominate
- C. f. juancitonis: smaller than nominate with more reddish crown
- C. f. waldroni: like juancitonis but smaller and with less brown on the breast
- C. f. wetmorei: paler crown, breast, and back and less gray underparts than nominate

All subspecies have a dark iris, a blackish maxilla, an orange-yellow mandible, and pale pink to grayish or brownish pink legs and feet.

== Distribution and habitat ==
The ruddy-capped nightingale-thrush has a disjunct distribution. The subspecies are found thus:

- C. f. omiltemensis: southwestern Mexico
- C. f. nelsoni: south-central Mexico
- C. f. chiapensis: southern Mexico into western Guatemala
- C. f. alticola: from Chiapas in southern Mexico south through Guatemala into El Salvador
- C. f. juancitonis: El Salvador and Honduras
- C. f. waldroni: northern Nicaragua
- C. f. frantzii: Costa Rica
- C. f. wetmorei: western Panama's Chiriquí Province

The ruddy-capped nightingale-thrush primarily inhabits montane evergreen forest (cloudforest) and pine-oak forest in the subtropical and lower temperate zones. It also occurs in nearby secondary forest, thickets, and modified habitats such as clearings. Overall it ranges in elevation mostly between 1,200 and 3,100 m (3,900 and 10,200 ft). In Mexico it occurs between 1,500 and 3,500 m (4,900 and 11,500 ft), in northern Central America between 1,500 and 3,050 m (4,900 and 10,000 ft), in Costa Rica between 1,500 and 2,500 m (4,900 and 8,200 ft), and in Panama between 1,200 and 2,400 m (3,900 and 7,900 ft).

== Behavior ==
=== Feeding ===
The ruddy-capped nightingale-thrush feeds primarily on insects, other invertebrates, and berries. It usually forages singly but in pairs during the breeding season. It forages on the ground and near it in the forest undergrowth. It has been observed following army ant swarms and also feeding on a small frog.

=== Breeding ===
The ruddy-capped nightingale-thrush breeds between February and June or July. It builds a cup nest from moss lined with rootlets, fine grass, and other soft plant fibers. Nests have been found up to about 2.3 m (8 ft) above the ground in understory vegetation. The clutch is two eggs that are pale blue with cinnamon-rufous and lilac speckles and blotches. The incubation period is 15 to 16 days and only the female incubates. Fledging occurs 14 to 16 days after hatch and both parents provision nestlings.

=== Vocalization ===
The ruddy-capped nightingale-thrush's song is "an ethereal, melancholic, liquid, and throaty, persistently uttered, and far-carrying series of short, deliberate and diverse phrases, with fluty trills, clear whistles and warbles". It is usually sung in the morning or evening and also in misty weather. Another description is "a sweet, fluid, melancholy series of organ-like whistles, in question-and-answer fashion, the notes rising and falling in pitch, with short, well-separated phrases". Its calls include "a quavering upslurred whistle: whierrr or whoeeet, to [a] burry wheeer or rising correeee", "a frog-like rising rrerrk or hoarse worrrk", and "a low and rather harsh kree-ee-eet".

== Status ==
The IUCN has assessed the ruddy-capped nightingale-thrush as being of Least Concern. It has a very large range; its estimated population of at least 50,000 mature individuals is believed to be decreasing. No immediate threats have been identified. However, it is deemed endangered in Mexico and El Salvador. It is considered uncommon in northern Central America and common in Costa Rica. "Throughout most its range, this species is potentially threatened by the exploitation and disturbance of its habitats by human activities, which may exacerbate the threat from natural processes such as volcanism for some populations."
