= Spotted nightingale-thrush =

The spotted nightingale-thrush has been split into the following:

- Yellow-throated nightingale-thrush, Catharus dryas
- Speckled nightingale-thrush, Catharus maculatus
