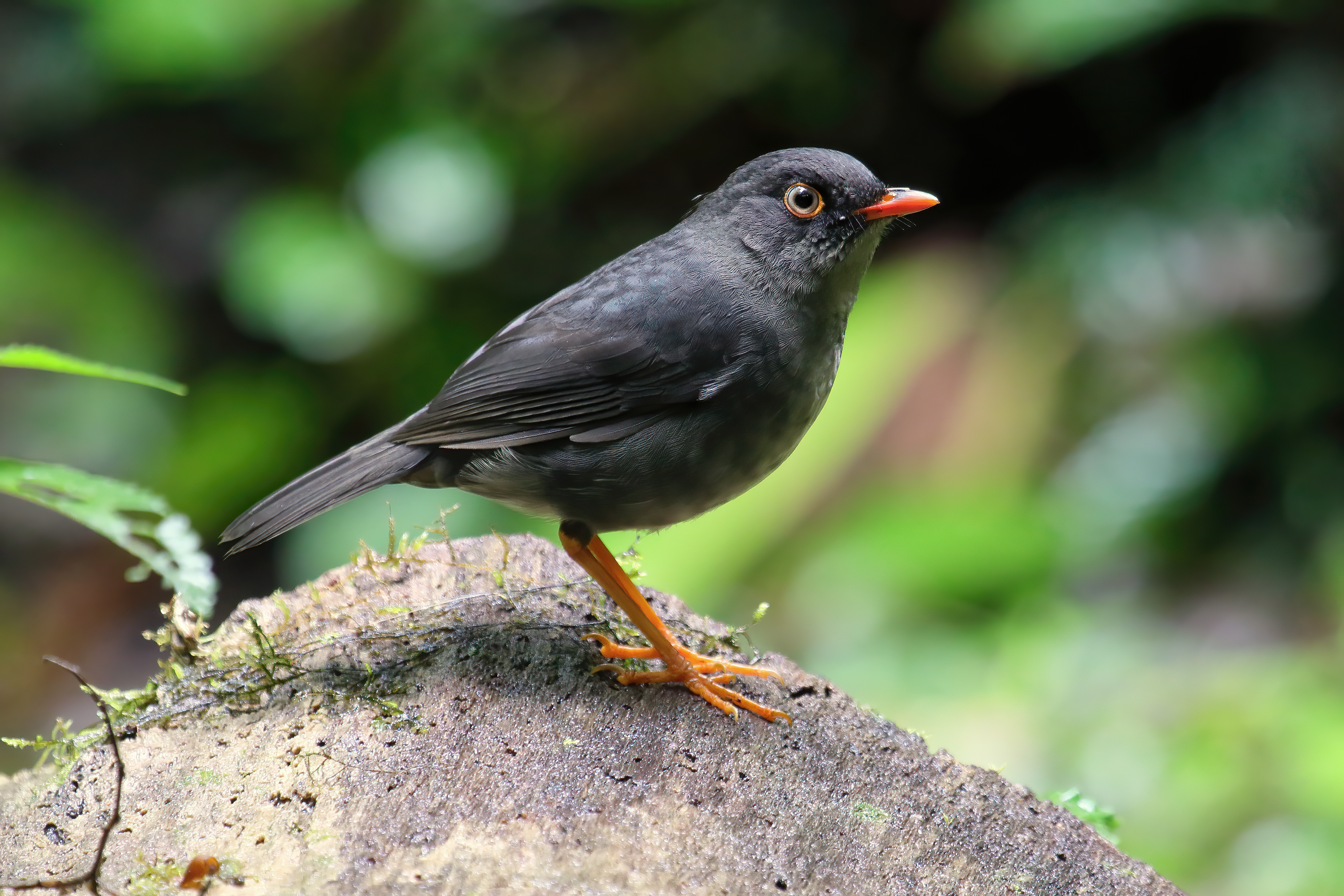
- In Costa Rica

Conservation status
- Least Concern (IUCN 3.1)

Scientific classification
- Kingdom: Animalia
- Phylum: Chordata
- Class: Aves
- Order: Passeriformes
- Family: Turdidae
- Genus: Catharus
- Species: C. fuscater

Binomial name
- Catharus fuscater (Lafresnaye, 1845)

= Slaty-backed nightingale-thrush =

Species of bird

The slaty-backed nightingale-thrush (Catharus fuscater) is a species of bird in the family Turdidae, the thrushes and allies. It is found in Bolivia, Colombia, Costa Rica, Ecuador, Panama, Peru, and Venezuela.

== Taxonomy and systematics ==
The slaty-backed nightingale-thrush was originally described in 1845 by as Myioturdus fuscater. It was later reassigned to its present genus Catharus that had been erected in 1850.

The slaty-backed nightingale's further taxonomy is unsettled. The IOC, AviList, and BirdLife International's Handbook of the Birds of the World assign it these seven subspecies:

- C. f. hellmayri Berlepsch, 1902
- C. f. mirabilis Nelson, 1912
- C. f. sanctaemartae Ridgway, 1904
- C. f. fuscater (Lafresnaye, 1845)
- C. f. opertaneus Wetmore, 1955
- C. f. caniceps Chapman, 1924
- C. f. mentalis Sclater, PL & Salvin, 1876

The Clements taxonomy recognizes four more subspecies:

- C. f. arcanus Halley, Catanach, Klicka & Weckstein, 2023
- C. f. tenebris Halley, Catanach, Klicka & Weckstein, 2023
- C. f. berlepschi Lawrence, 1887
- C. f. nebulus Halley, Catanach, Klicka & Weckstein, 2023

Halley et al. separate C. f. arcanus from C. f. mirabilis and C. f. tenebris from C. f. caniceps. They treat berlepschi as a full species and nebulus as a subspecies of it.

This article follows the seven-subspecies model with one exception in the Distribution section.

== Description ==
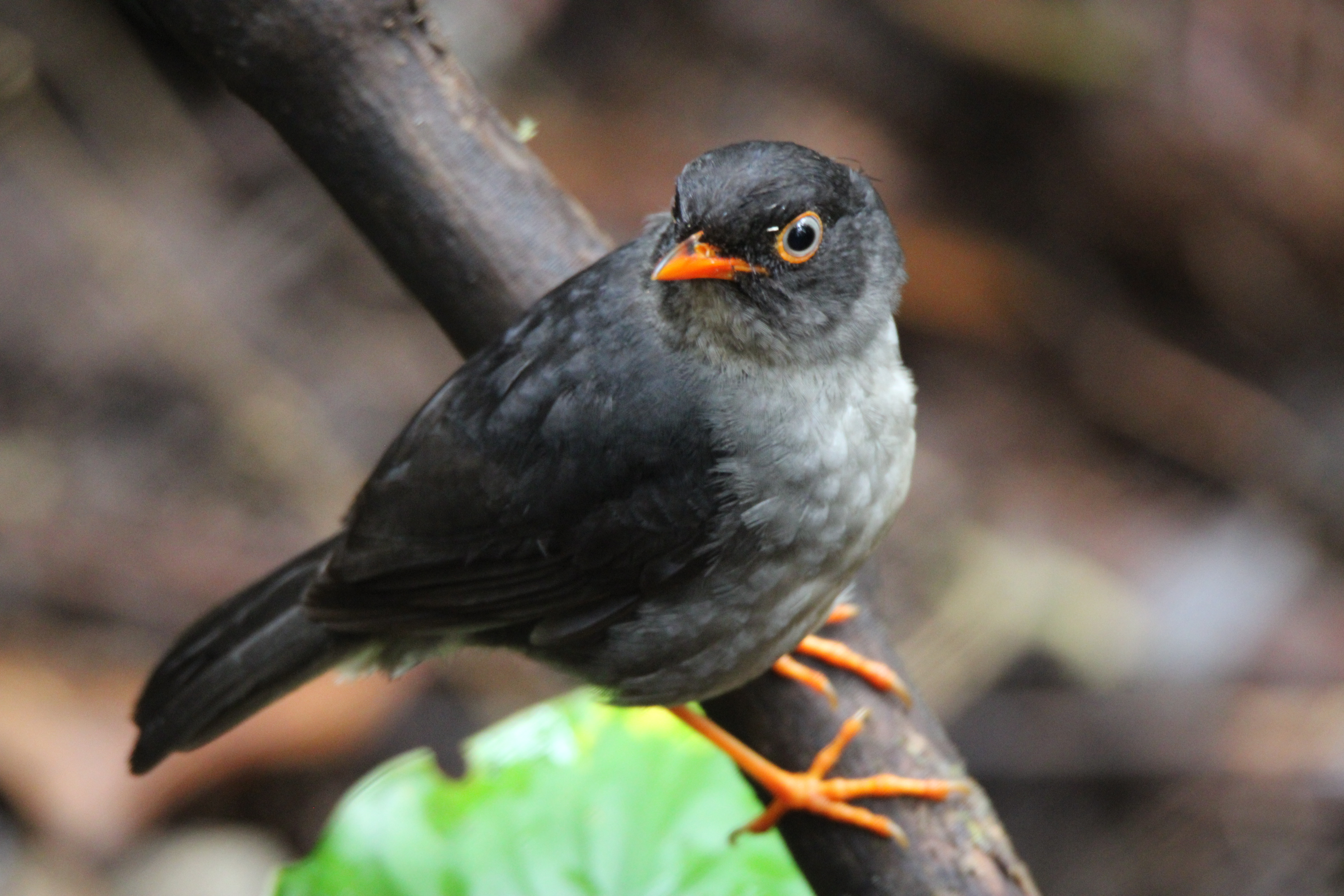
In Costa Rica

The slaty-backed nightingale-thrush is 17 to 18 cm (6.7 to 7.1 in) long. Specimens from Ecuador and Colombia weighed 30.5 to 38 g (1.1 to 1.3 oz). The sexes have the same plumage. Adults of the nominate subspecies C. f. fuscater have a dark slate gray head with a bright orange to yellowish orange eye-ring and a white to gray throat. Their upperparts are dark slate gray. Their underparts are mostly dark slate gray; the center of the breast and belly have varying amounts of white mixed in and sometimes a yellowish tint to the white.

The other subspecies of the slaty-backed nightingale-thrush differ from the nominate and each other thus:

- C. f. hellmayri: more blackish upperparts than nominate, mouse gray throat, darker underparts
- C. f. mirabilis: essentially like the nominate
- C. f. sanctaemartae: upperparts like nominate but less white on underparts
- C. f. opertaneus: the limited number of specimens are browner than nominate
- C. f. caniceps: somewhat lighter upperparts than nominate and less white on underparts
- C. f. mentalis: brownish wash on upperparts and darker underparts than nominate

All subspecies usually have a white iris though it is sometimes cinnamon brown. They have bright orange bills.

== Distribution and habitat ==
The slaty-backed nightingale-thrush has a disjunct distribution. Sources differ widely on the subspecies' ranges, in part due to the additional subspecies listed by Clements.

The IOC places the subspecies thus:

- C. f. hellmayri: Costa Rica and western Panama
- C. f. mirabilis: eastern Panama
- C. f. sanctaemartae: northern Colombia
- C. f. fuscater: eastern Panama, Colombia to western Ecuador, and western Venezuela
- C. f. opertaneus: western Colombia
- C. f. caniceps: northwestern and central Peru
- C. f. mentalis: southeastern Peru and northwestern Bolivia

Clements provides more detail and several differences. The four additional subspecies are also included here:

- C. f. hellmayri: mountains of Costa Rica and western Panama's Chiriquí and Veruagas provinces
- C. f. mirabilis: eastern Panama's Cerro Pirre and vicinity
- C. f. arcanus: "Serranía de Majé eastward to Cerro Tacarcuna (eastern Panama)"
- C. f. sanctaemartae: Sierra Nevada de Santa Marta in northern Colombia
- C. f. fuscater: Serranía del Perijá on the Colombia-Venezuela border and eastern Andes of Venezuela southward to Bogotá in Colombia
- C. f. opertaneus: "western Andes of Colombia (Antioquia southward to Tolima), and east-central Andes in Napo, Ecuador"
- C. f. tenebris: "Rio Chinchipe watershed of southeastern Ecuador and northern Peru"
- C. f. berlepschi "western Andes of Ecuador from Carchi to El Oro"
- C. f. caniceps: El Oro to northwestern Peru
- C. f. nebulus: eastern Andean slope of Peru from Amazonas to Cuzco departments
- C. f. mentalis: Andes from Puno Department in Peru into Bolivia's La Paz Department

Field guides to the birds of several countries generally matched the two taxonomic systems' range descriptions; some provided even more detail. In Costa Rica the species is shown on both the Caribbean and Pacific slopes of the central mountain ranges. In the Venezuelan Andes the range is detailed as from southern Táchira north through Mérida, northwestern Barinas, Trujillo and southeastern Lara. The species is shown in all three ranges of the Colombian Andes though not along their full lengths. In Ecuador it is shown in a continuous band along the western Andean slope and spottily on the eastern slope. It is shown and described in the Peruvian Andes on the western slope only in the northwest but along almost the entire length of the country on the eastern slope.

One source states that the slaty-backed nightingale-thrush inhabits montane evergreen forest in the subtropical zone between 800 and 2,300 m (2,600 and 7,500 ft). Another says it "inhabits the dense undergrowth of moist and humid forests of the subtropical and lower montane zones" between 600 and 3,250 m (2,000 and 10,700 ft). A field guide adds that the species favors streamside locations. Within individual countries it ranges from 800 to 1,800 m (2,600 to 5,900 ft) in Costa Rica, 1,500 to 2,900 m (4,900 to 9,500 ft) in Venezuela and Peru, 800 to 2,800 m (2,600 to 9,200 ft) in Colombia, and mostly 1,200 to 2,600 m (3,900 to 8,500 ft) in Ecuador.

== Behavior ==
=== Movement ===
The slaty-backed nightingale-thrush is a year-round resident.

=== Feeding ===
The slaty-backed nightingale-thrush is described as omnivorous. It has been noted feeding on beetles, ants, other small insects, spiders, and berries. It forages in understory vegetation and on the ground. In Costa Rica it has been seen following army ant swarms.

=== Breeding ===
The slaty-backed nightingale-thrush's breeding season has not been fully described but includes January in Peru, March to July in central Colombia, and April and May in Panama. Its nest is a cup made from rootlets, moss, and leaves; apparently the female alone builds it. It is typically placed in dense vegetation within about 3 m (10 ft) of the ground. The clutch is one or two eggs that are pale blue with darker markings. The incubation period, time to fledging, and details of parental care are not known.

=== Vocalization ===
A lyric description of the slaty-backed nightingale-thrush's song is "a dreamy, mesmerizing series of low, flute like phrases...eer-lee or ur-eee-lee, phrases halting and hypnotic, as if disembodied from [the] bird and floating eerily through the forest". Another description is "melodious and leisurely...a series of simple phrases, e.g, toh-toh-tee...tee-toh or tlee-to-tleedelee...to wee-tlee?". Among its calls are "a catlike meeaaaaaah or meeow", "a more buzzing wheeety or whewty weer", a high-pitched whistling poeeee", and "a low, grating khroum-khroum".

== Status ==
The IUCN has assessed the slaty-backed nightingale-thrush as being of Least Concern. It has a very large range; its population size is not known and is believed to be decreasing. No immediate threats have been identified. It is considered common in Costa Rica, locally common in Venezuela, fairly common in Colombia, more numerous in western Ecuador than eastern, and uncommon in Peru. "Clearing of montane forests for coffee cultivation has negatively affected [the] Slaty-backed Nightingale-Thrush in the vicinity of Volcán Barú, Panama."
