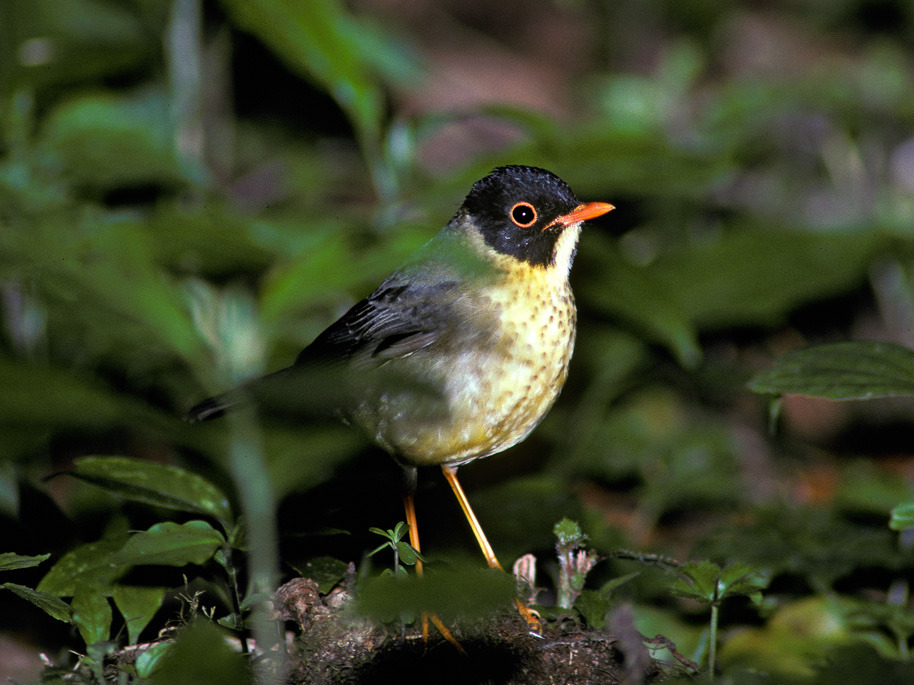

Conservation status
- Least Concern (IUCN 3.1)

Scientific classification
- Kingdom: Animalia
- Phylum: Chordata
- Class: Aves
- Order: Passeriformes
- Family: Turdidae
- Genus: Catharus
- Species: C. dryas

Binomial name
- Catharus dryas (Gould, 1855)

= Yellow-throated nightingale-thrush =

Species of bird

The yellow-throated nightingale-thrush or Gould's nightingale-thrush (Catharus dryas) is a species of bird in the family Turdidae, the thrushes and allies. It is found from Mexico to Nicaragua.

== Taxonomy and systematics ==
The yellow-throated nightingale-thrush was originally described in 1855 as Malacochicla dryas. The two subspecies of what is now the speckled nightingale-thrush (Catharus maculatus), also called Sclater's nightingale-thrush, were long treated as subspecies of the reassigned Catharus dryas. Together they were called the spotted nightingale-thrush. Following a study of the species' vocalizations published in 2017, taxonomic systems began separating them.

The further taxonomy of the yellow-throated nightingale-thrush is unsettled. The IOC, AviList, and BirdLife International's Handbook of the Birds of the World assign it these three subspecies:

- C. d. harrisoni Phillips, AR & Rook, 1965
- C. d. ovandensis Brodkorb, 1938
- C. d. dryas (Gould, 1855)

The Clements taxonomy does not recognize C. d. harrisoni but includes it within C. d. ovandensis.

This article follows the three-subspecies model.

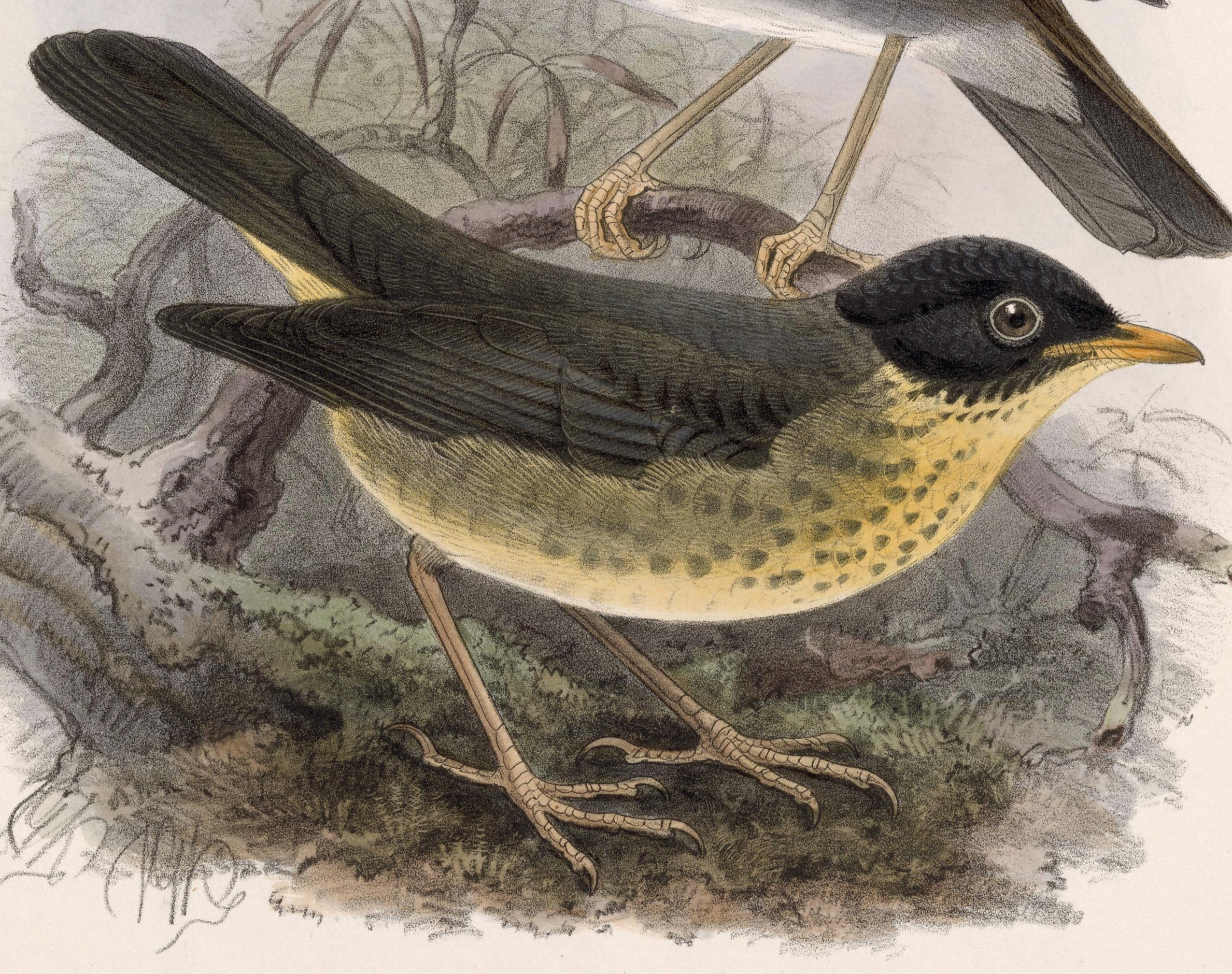
1902 illustration

== Description ==
The yellow-throated nightingale-thrush is 17 to 19 cm (6.7 to 7.5 in) long and weighs 36 to 44 g (1.3 to 1.6 oz). Adult males of the nominate subspecies C. d. dryas have a mostly black head with an orange eye-ring and a buff chin and upper throat. Their upperparts are dull olive-gray. Their lower throat, breast, and upper belly are apricot-yellow with olive spots, their flanks grayish, and their lower belly and vent are whitish. Adult females are dark grayish on the back of their crown and head and have more olive upperparts than males. Subspecies C. d. harrisoni and C. d. ovandensis are nearly alike. They have grayer upperparts than the nominate and grey spots on their underparts. All subspecies have a dark iris, an orange bill, and orange legs and feet.

== Distribution and habitat ==
The yellow-throated nightingale-thrush has a disjunct distribution. Subspecies C. d. harrisoni is found in the southwestern Mexican state of Oaxaca. C. d. ovandensis is found in the southern Mexican state of Chiapas. The nominate subspecies C. d. dryas has two or three separate ranges. One is across most of southern Guatemala. Another is in northern El Salvador and western Honduras and a third is in central Honduras. Other sources show a continuous range from Oaxaca through southern Guatemala, exclude the central Honduras population, and add a small range in extreme northwestern Nicaragua.

The yellow-throated nightingale-thrush primarily inhabits humid tropical and subtropical forest where it favors damp ravines and areas along forest streams. South of Mexico it also inhabits pine-oak forest and higher-elevation coffee plantations. One source defines its elevational range as 1,200 to 3,000 m (3,900 to 9,800 ft) and another as 600 to 3,000 m (2,000 to 9,800 ft). South of Mexico it is 600 to 2,850 m (2,000 to 9,400 ft).

== Behavior ==
=== Movement ===
The yellow-throated nightingale-thrush is a year-round resident.

=== Feeding ===
The yellow-throated nightingale-thrush's diet has not been studied. It forages low in the forest understory and on the ground. It sometimes attends army ant swarms.

=== Breeding ===
The yellow-throated nightingale-thrush breeds between May and October in Mexico; its breeding season elsewhere has not been fully defined but includes August in El Salvador. The typical clutch is two eggs that are bluish white speckled with rust and gray. Nothing else is known about the species' breeding biology.

=== Vocalization ===
The yellow-throated nightingale-thrush's song is somewhat variable though each individual appears to have a single song. Examples are "a scratchy warbling series of sharp whistles and buzzes: chit-TSEE!-tah'wert-PEE'tseee-Cheet or TSIP!Tseee-cheet-tsee'weet". The song lasts about two seconds. The species' calls include "a sharp, high-pitched whistle, tsseeeeeee, or a catlike contact call, rreeahhhh".

== Status ==
The IUCN has assessed the yellow-throated nightingale-thrush as being of Least Concern. It has a large range; its population size is not known and is believed to be decreasing. "Little is known about the threat posed to the Gould's Nightingale-thrush. The largest threat posed stems from deforestation and the resultant loss of suitable habitat." On source considers it "locally fairly common" overall, "uncommon to rare" in Honduras, and almost unknown in Nicaragua. Another calls it common in northern Central America (Guatemala, El Salvador, and Honduras) without country-by-country detail.
