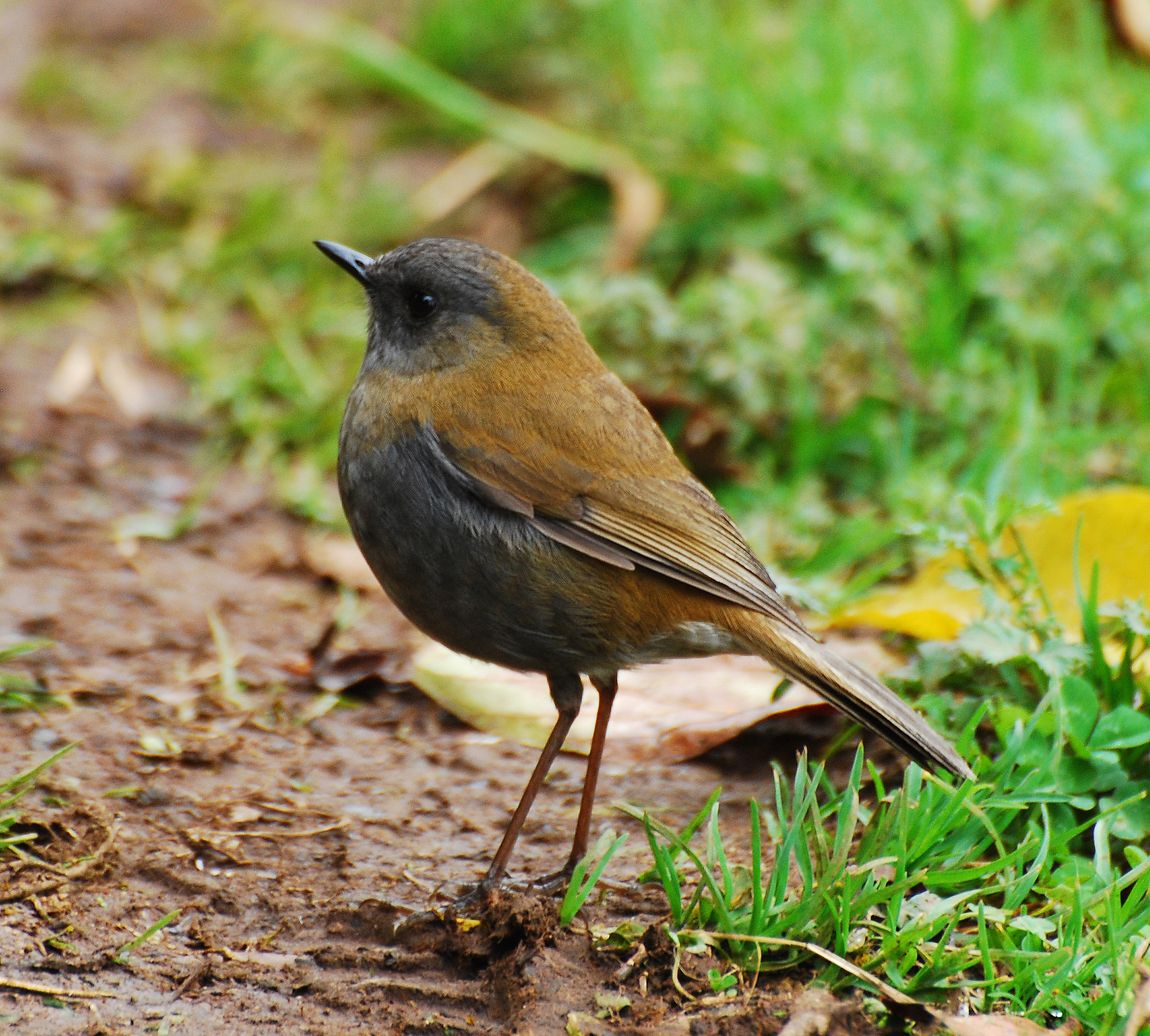

Conservation status
- Least Concern (IUCN 3.1)

Scientific classification
- Kingdom: Animalia
- Phylum: Chordata
- Class: Aves
- Order: Passeriformes
- Family: Turdidae
- Genus: Catharus
- Species: C. gracilirostris

Binomial name
- Catharus gracilirostris Salvin, 1865

= Black-billed nightingale-thrush =

Species of bird

The black-billed nightingale-thrush (Catharus gracilirostris) is a species of bird in the family Turdidae, the thrushes and allies. It is found in Costa Rica and Panama.

== Taxonomy and systematics ==
The black-billed nightingale-thrush was originally described in 1865 with its current binomial Catharus gracilirostris.

The black-billed nightingale's further taxonomy is unsettled. The IOC, AviList, and BirdLife International's Handbook of the Birds of the World assign it three subspecies: the nominate C. g. gracilirostris (Salvin, 1865), C. g. accentor (Bangs, 1902), and C. g. bensoni (Griscom, 1924). The Clements taxonomy recognizes two by including bensoni within accentor.

This article follows the three-subspecies model.

== Description ==
The black-billed nightingale-thrush is about 15 cm (5.9 in) long and weighs about 20 g (0.71 oz) The sexes have the same plumage. Adults of the nominate subspecies have a slate-gray forecrown, an olive-brown crown, and a slate-gray face. Their upperparts, wings, and the upper side of their tail are olive-brown. Their throat is whitish, the middle of their lower belly light gray to whitish, and the rest of their underparts slate-gray with an olivaceous band across the breast. They have a dark brown iris, a black bill, and dark gray legs and feet. Juveniles have more olive in their upperparts than adults, with an olive-tinged sooty gray face and throat and darker underparts with some spotting on the breast and upper belly. Subspecies C. g. accentor has more reddish-brown upperparts, a paler breast band, and blacker legs and feet than the nominate. C. g. bensoni also has more reddish-brown upperparts, with a blackish brown forecrown, a dark reddish brown breast band, and blacker legs and feet.

== Distribution and habitat ==
The black-billed nightingale-thrush has the smallest range of any Catharus thrush, and its distribution is disjunct. The nominate subspecies is found in Costa Rica's Cordillera Central and Cordillera de Talamanca. In the Cordillera Central it occurs on four volcanos separated by low passes, and a major valley separates them from the Cordillera de Talamanca. The other two subspecies are found in western Panama's Chiriquí Province, C. g. accentor in the west and C. g. bensoni in the east. The exact geographical divisions among the three subspecies in eastern Costa Rica and western Panama have not been fully resolved.

The black-billed nightingale-thrush primarily inhabits montane evergreen forest, elfin forest, and paramo in the upper subtropical and temperate zones. It also occurs in pastures, gardens, and along roads when seeking food. One source states that overall it ranges from 1,800 m (5,900 ft) up to the timber line. In Costa Rica it ranges from 2,200 m (7,200 ft) to above timberline.

== Behavior ==
=== Movement ===
The black-billed nightingale-thrush is a year-round resident.

=== Feeding ===
The black-billed nightingale-thrush feeds mostly on small insects and also includes spiders and small amounts of fruit in its diet. It forages singly and, during the breeding season, in pairs, and usually on the ground. On the ground it tosses leaves and leaf litter to expose prey. It will forage in the forest canopy as high as about 25 m (80 ft) and along forest trails. It often is quite tame.

=== Breeding ===
The black-billed nightingale-thrush's breeding season has not been defined. Its nest is a bulky cup made mostly from mosses and roots with a lining of softer materials. It typically is in dense vegetation up to about 5 m (15 ft) above the ground. The clutch is two eggs that are greenish blue with chestnut-brown markings. The incubation period, time to fledging, and details of parental care are not known.

=== Vocalization ===
The black-billed nightingale-thrush has a variety of vocalizations. Its song is composed of up to about 18 phrases, each different than the preceding one, and typically alternating between higher and lower pitches. Males usually sing from within understory vegetation and only seldom much higher. During the breeding season males countersing.

== Status ==
The IUCN has assessed the black-billed nightingale-thrush as being of Least Concern. It has a small range; its estimated population of between 20,000 and 50,000 mature individuals is believed to be stable. No immediate threats have been identified. It is considered common overall and much of its range in Costa Rica is protected in a national park. In Costa Rica it is very common up to timber line and less so above it.
