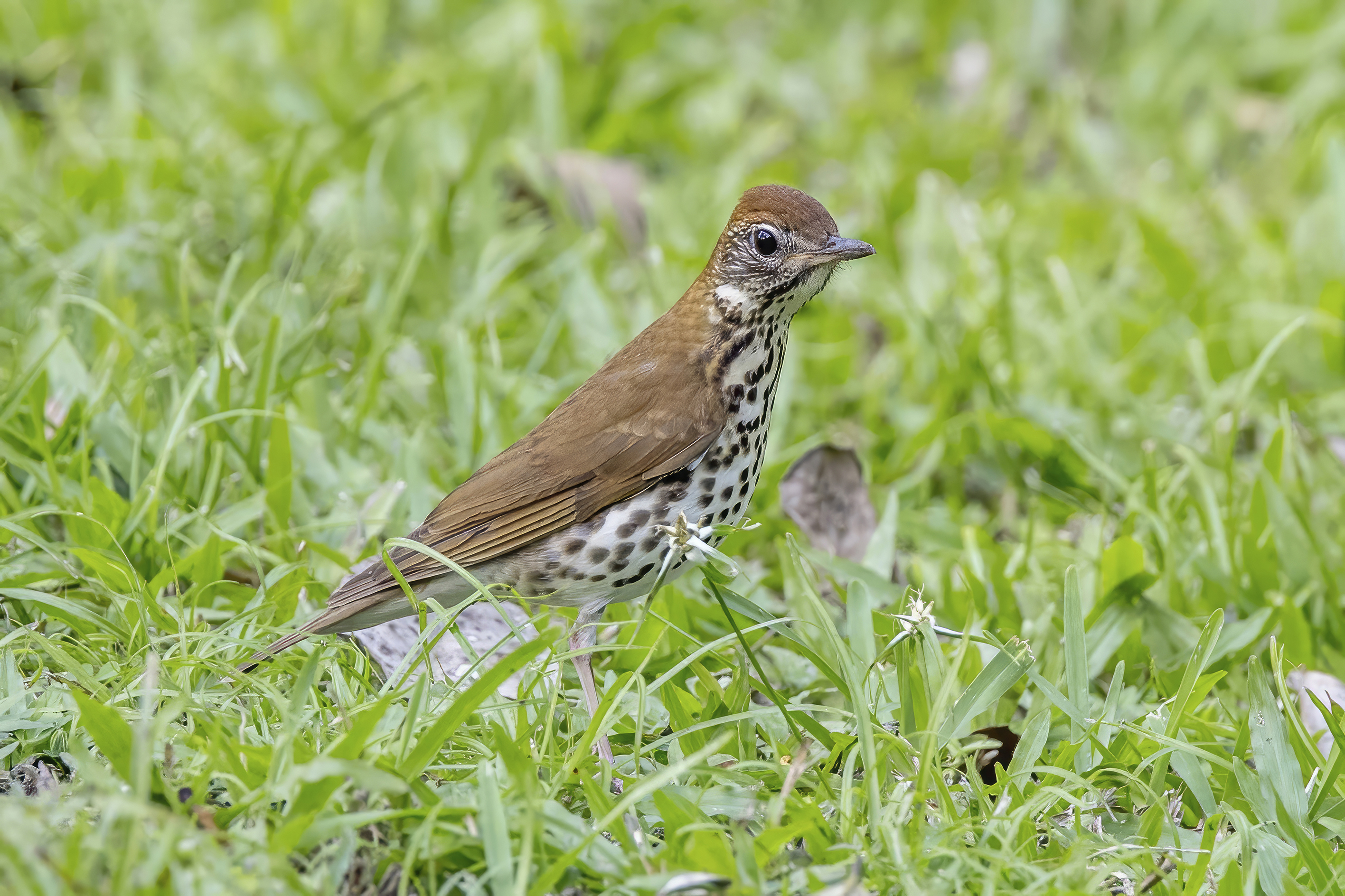

Conservation status
- Least Concern (IUCN 3.1)

Scientific classification
- Kingdom: Animalia
- Phylum: Chordata
- Class: Aves
- Order: Passeriformes
- Family: Turdidae
- Genus: Hylocichla; Baird, 1864
- Species: H. mustelina

Binomial name
- Hylocichla mustelina (Gmelin, JF, 1789)
- Breeding Migration Nonbreeding

Synonyms
- Turdus mustelinus Gmelin, 1789; Merula mustelina (Gmelin, 1789); Catharus mustelinus (Gmelin, 1789)

Audio

= Wood thrush =

Species of bird

The wood thrush (Hylocichla mustelina) is a North American passerine bird in the family Turdidae and is the only species placed in the genus Hylocichla. It is closely related to other thrushes such as the American robin and is widely distributed across North America, wintering in Central America and southern Mexico. The wood thrush is the official bird of the District of Columbia.

The wood thrush is a medium-sized thrush, with brown upper parts with mottled brown and white underparts. The male and female are similar in appearance. The song of the male is often cited as being the most beautiful in North America.

The wood thrush is an omnivore, and feeds preferentially on soil invertebrates and larvae, but will also eat fruits. In the summer, it feeds on insects continuously in order to meet daily metabolic needs. It is solitary, but sometimes forms mixed-species flocks. The wood thrush defends a territory that ranges in size from 800 to 28,000 m^{2} (960 to 33,490 sq yd). The wood thrush is monogamous, and its breeding season begins in the spring; about 50% of all mated pairs are able to raise two broods, ranging in size from two to four chicks.

== Taxonomy ==
The wood thrush was formally described in 1789 by the German naturalist Johann Friedrich Gmelin in his revised and expanded edition of Carl Linnaeus's Systema Naturae. He placed it with the thrushes in the genus Turdus and coined the binomial name Turdus mustelinus. Gmelin based his account on the "Tawny thrush" that had been described in 1785 by the Welsh naturalist Thomas Pennant in his book Arctic Zoology. Pennant specified its type locality as the New York (state) region. The wood thrush is now the only species placed in the genus Hylocichla that was introduced in 1864 by the American naturalist S.F. Baird. The species is monotypic: no subspecies are recognised. The generic name is a translation of its common name, derived from the Greek words ύλη (hyle, "woodland") and κιχλη (cichle, "thrush" or "fieldfare"). The species name comes from the Latin mustela "weasel".

This thrush is closely related to the other typical American thrushes of the genus Catharus, and is sometimes merged into that genus. It has been considered close to the long-distance migrant species of that genus, as opposed to the generally resident nightingale-thrushes, but that appears to be an error. The wood thrush also appears to be fairly closely related to the large Turdus thrushes, such as the American robin. "Wood thrush" is the official common name given to the species by the International Ornithologists' Union (IOC).

== Description ==
The adult wood thrush is 18 to 21.5 cm (7.1 to 8.5 in) long, with a wingspan of 30 to 40 cm (12 to 16 in) and a body mass of 48 to 72 g (1.7 to 2.5 oz). Among standard measurements, the wing chord is 9.6 to 11.6 cm (3.8 to 4.6 in), the bill is 1.6 to 2 cm (0.63 to 0.79 in) and the tarsus is 2.8 to 3.3 cm (1.1 to 1.3 in). It is distinctly larger than the Catharus thrushes with which the species is often sympatric but slightly smaller than the common American robin. The longest known lifespan for a wood thrush in the wild is 8 years, 11 months. The crown, nape, and upper back are cinnamon-brown, while the back wings, and tail are a slightly duller brown. The breast and belly are white with large dark brown spots on the breast, sides, and flanks. It has white eye rings and pink legs. Other brownish thrushes have finer spotting on the breast. The juvenile looks similar to adults, but has additional spots on the back, neck, and wing coverts. The male and female are similar in size and plumage.

=== Vocalization ===
The wood thrush has been reported to have one of the most beautiful songs of North American birds. American naturalist Henry David Thoreau wrote:

Whenever a man hears it he is young, and Nature is in her spring; wherever he hears it, it is a new world and a free country, and the gates of Heaven are not shut against him.

While the female is not known to sing, the male has a unique song that has three parts. The first subsong component is often inaudible unless the listener is close, and consists of two to six short, low-pitched notes such as bup, bup, bup. The middle part is a loud phrase often written ee-oh-lay, and the third part is a ventriloquial, trill-like phrase of non-harmonic pairs of notes given rapidly and simultaneously.

The male is able to sing two notes at once, which gives its song an ethereal, flute-like quality. Each individual bird has its own repertoire based on combinations of variations of the three parts. Songs are often repeated in order. The bup, bup, bup phrase is also sometimes used as a call, which is louder and at a greater frequency when the bird is agitated. The wood thrush also use a tut, tut to signal agitation. The nocturnal flight call is an emphatic buzzing heeh.

== Distribution and habitat ==
The wood thrush's breeding range extends from Manitoba, Ontario and Nova Scotia in southern Canada to northern Florida and from the Atlantic coast to the Missouri River and the eastern Great Plains. It migrates to southern Mexico through to Panama in Central America in the winter, mostly in the lowlands along the Atlantic and Pacific coasts. It generally arrives on the U.S. Gulf Coast during the first week of April. Fall migration usually begins in mid-August and continues through mid-September. Migration takes place at night, allowing them to find their direction from the stars and orient themselves by detecting the Earth's magnetic field.

The wood thrush prefers deciduous and mixed forests for breeding. It prefers late-successional, upland mesic forests with a moderately-dense shrub layer. It favors areas with running water, moist ground, and high understorey cover. The breeding habitat generally includes trees taller than 16 m (52 ft), a fairly open forest floor, moist soil, and leaf litter, with substrate moisture more important than either canopy cover or access to running water. The wood thrush can breed in habitat patches as small as 0.4 hectares (0.99 acres), but it runs the risk of higher predation and nest parasitism. The wood thrush's breeding range has expanded northward, displacing the veery and hermit thrush in some locations. In recent times, as a result of fragmentation of forests, it has been increasingly exposed to nest parasitism by brown-headed cowbirds, as well as loss of habitat in the winter range.

A Costa Rica-based study found that wood thrushes prefer environments with high precipitation on their non-breeding grounds, possibly due to greater prey availability in those habitats.

=== Conservation status ===
The wood thrush has become a symbol of the decline of Neotropical songbirds of eastern North America, having declined by approximately 50% since 1966. Along with many other species, this thrush faces threats both to its North American breeding grounds and Central American wintering grounds. Forest fragmentation in North American forests has resulted in both increased nest predation and increased cowbird parasitism, significantly reducing their reproductive success. A study by the Cornell Laboratory of Ornithology was the first large-scale analysis that linked acid rain to this thrush's decline. Continued destruction of primary forest in Central America eliminated preferred wood thrush wintering habitats, likely forcing the birds to choose secondary habitats where mortality rates are higher. In spite of this, the wood thrush is considered to be Least Concern.

=== Vagrancy ===
The wood thrush has been recorded twice as a vagrant in Europe, in Iceland at Kvísker in Öræfi East Skaftafellssýsla by Björnsson Hálfdán on 23 October 1967 and on Wingletang Down, St Agnes, Isles of Scilly, England on 7 October 1987.

== Behavior ==
A wood thrush singing in Central Park, New York City

The wood thrush is primarily solitary, but occasionally forms mixed-species flocks in the winter. Its breeding territory ranges from 800 to 8,000 m^{2} (960 to 9,570 sq yd) in size, and are used for nesting, gathering nest materials, and foraging. Some wood thrushes also defend a feeding territory in the winter. Territorial interactions are usually settled without physical contact, but in high-intensity encounters or nest defense, physical interactions with the feet or bill have been observed. Defense behaviors in response to nest predators include wing flicks, tail flicks, and raising the crest, sometimes escalating to dives and strikes.

This species has also been observed displaying a behavior known as "anting." Anting occurs when a bird picks up a single ant or group of ants and rubs them on its feathers. The purpose of this behavior is unknown, but it is thought that the birds may be able to acquire defensive secretions from the ants possibly used for some medicinal purposes, or that it simply supplements the birds' own preen oil.

=== Diet ===
Soil invertebrates and larvae make up most of the wood thrush's omnivorous diet, but it will also eat fruits in the late summer, fall, and late winter. It occasionally feeds on arboreal insects, snails, and small salamanders. The young are fed insects and some fruit. After breeding and before migration, the wood thrush will switch from insects to fruits with high lipid levels. In the summer, low fruit consumption and lipid reserves require the bird to feed on insects continuously in order to meet its metabolic needs.

The wood thrush forages mainly on the forest floor, flipping leaves over with its bills to reveal insects. It can be observed hopping around in leaf litter and on semi-bare ground under the forest canopy. Fruits are swallowed whole.

=== Predation ===
Eggs and chicks are vulnerable to chipmunks, raccoons, blue jays, American crows, black rat snakes, brown-headed cowbirds, common grackles, southern flying squirrels, gray squirrels, least weasels, white-footed mice, domestic cats, great horned owls, and sharp-shinned hawks. Adults are primarily taken by hawks and owls.

=== Reproduction ===
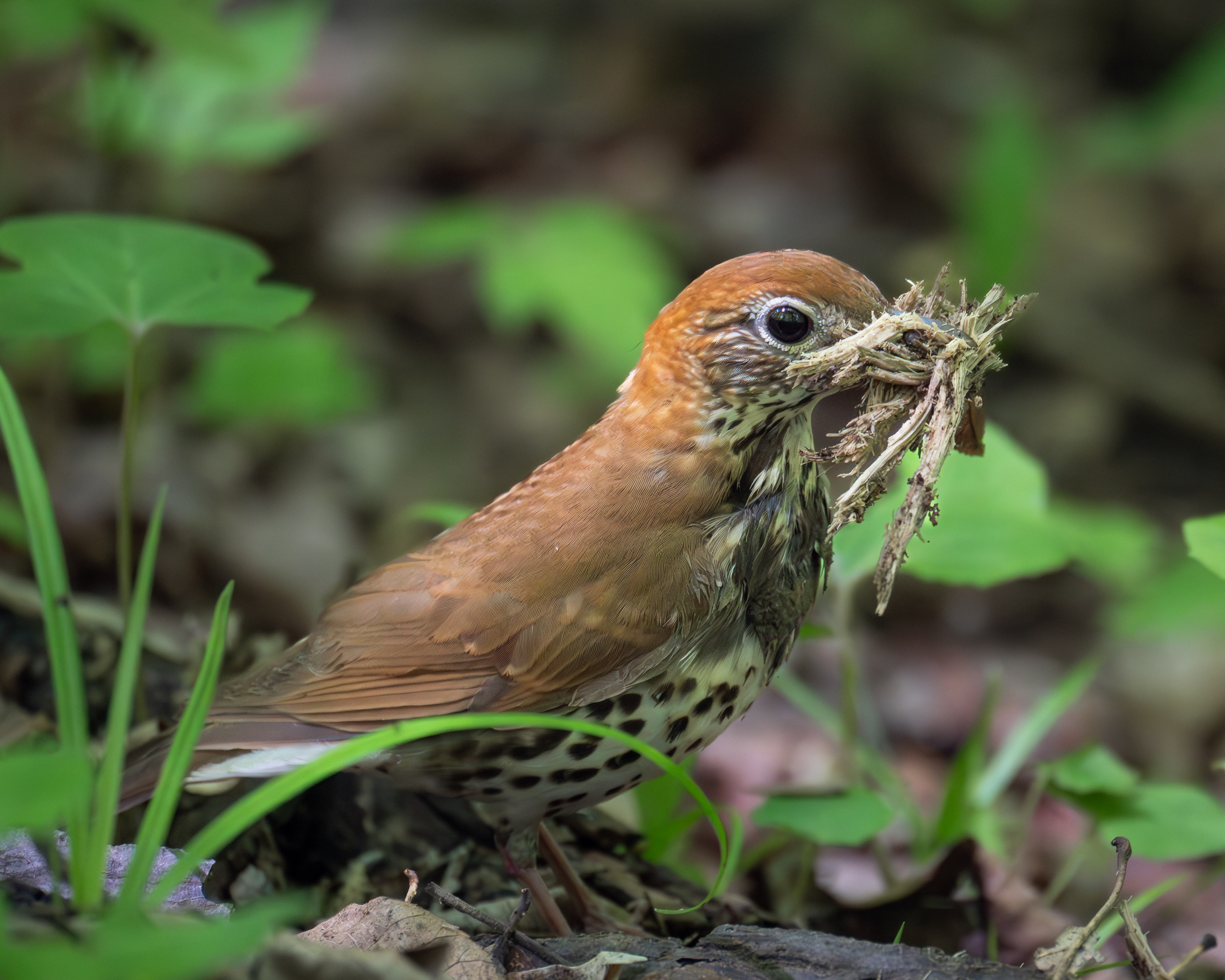
Wood thrush with nesting material in Michigan, USA

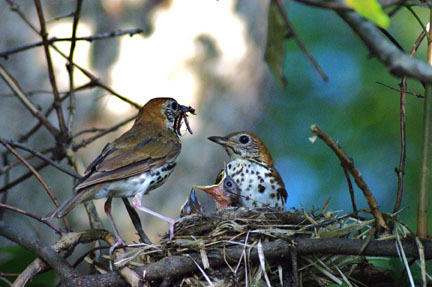
Nesting in Pennsylvania, USA

Wood thrushes are monogamous. Breeding pairs form in mid-April to early-May, and usually last throughout the breeding season. Most thrushes find a new mate each year, and mate guarding and extra-pair copulations have not been observed in this species.

Some male wood thrushes arrive at the breeding grounds several days before the earliest females while other males arrive at the same time as the females, establishing territories ranging in size from 0.08 to 0.8 hectares (one-fifth of an acre to two acres). The female typically leads silent circular flights 1–1.8 m (3.3–5.9 ft) from the ground, with the male chasing. Six or more flights generally take place in succession. The pairs will perch together and feed each other in between flights. The male begins to sing at dawn and dusk a few days after arriving at breeding grounds. Early in the breeding season, the male sings from high perches in the tallest trees, but as the season progresses, it sings somewhat shorter and less elaborate songs from lower perches. Each day's singing begins and is most intense just before sunrise. The male may sing throughout the day but especially at dusk. The song season is usually over by the end of July.

Typically, the female chooses the nest site and builds the nest. However, there has been some indication that the male is able to influence the selection of the nest site by perching nearby and singing. Usually, though, the female chooses whether or not to accept or reject the nest site suggested by the male. The nest is usually sited in a dense patch of vegetation in a tree or shrub that provides concealment and shade. It is usually made of dead grasses, stems, and leaves, and lined with mud, and placed in a fork at a horizontal branch. The nest is not reused. Usually, two broods are attempted, although three to four separate nests may be built before a pair succeeds. Two to four pale blue eggs are laid at the rate of one per day. The eggs are incubated by the female only for 11 to 14 days, with the average being 13 days. Like all passerines, the chicks are altricial at hatching, mostly naked with closed eyes. The female broods the chicks during the first four days after hatching. Both parents feed the nestlings and remove fecal sacs from the nest. The chicks fledge 12–15 days after hatching, but the parents continue to feed them until they become independent and leave the parents' territory at 21–31 days old.

The young wood thrush is able to begin breeding the next summer. Most females lay their first eggs in mid-May, but older females may begin laying sooner. Pairs usually attempt to rear a second brood no later than late July, with the last of the young fledging around mid-August. About half of all wood thrush pairs successfully raise two broods.
