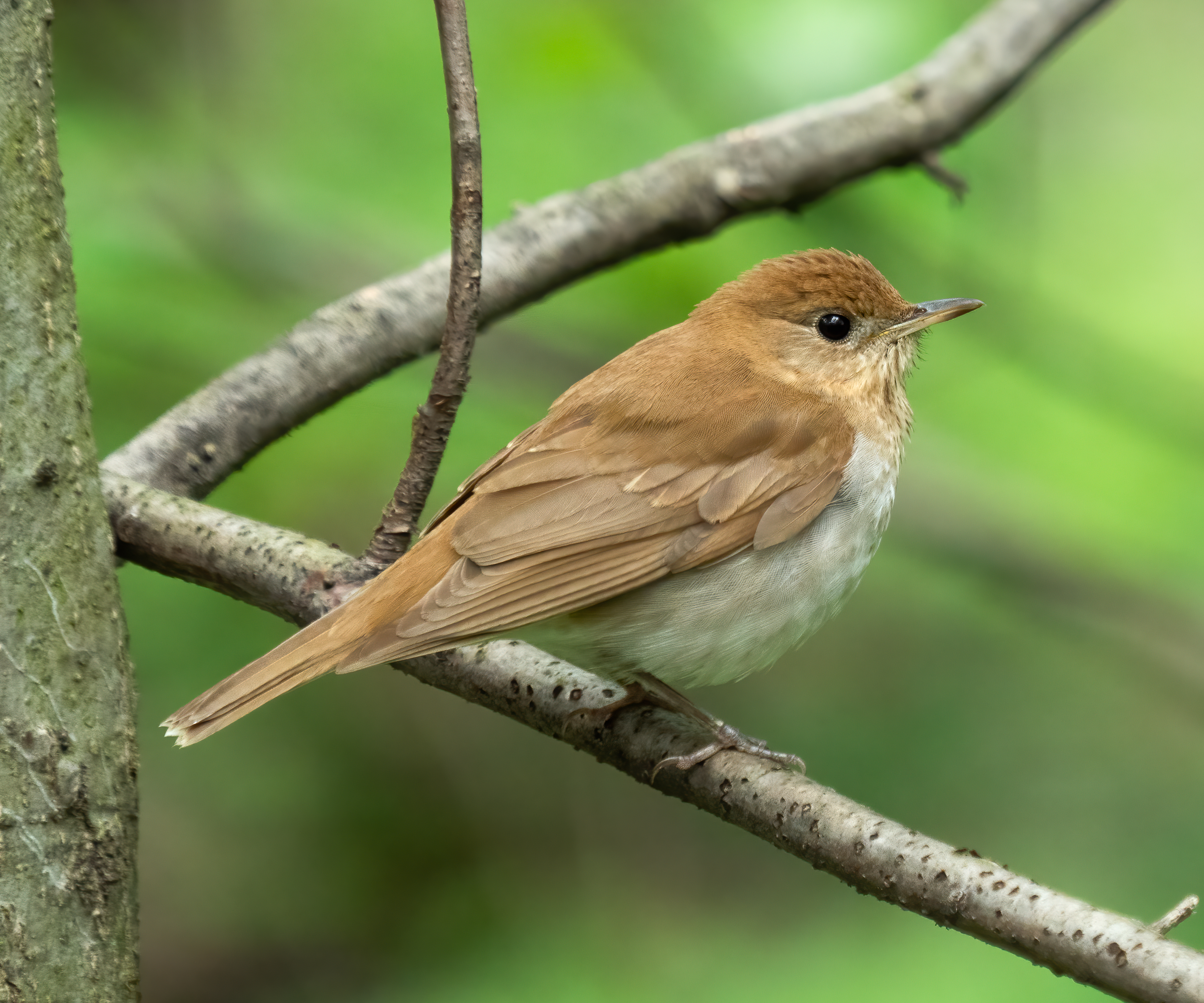

Conservation status
- Least Concern (IUCN 3.1)

Scientific classification
- Kingdom: Animalia
- Phylum: Chordata
- Class: Aves
- Order: Passeriformes
- Family: Turdidae
- Genus: Catharus
- Species: C. fuscescens

Binomial name
- Catharus fuscescens (Stephens, 1817)
- Veery range Breeding range Wintering range

Synonyms
- Hylocichla fuscescens

= Veery =

Species of bird

The veery (Catharus fuscescens) is a small North American thrush species, a member of a group of closely related and similar species in the genus Catharus, also including the gray-cheeked thrush (C. minimus), Bicknell's thrush (C. bicknelli), Swainson's thrush (C. ustulatus), and hermit thrush (C. guttatus). Alternate names for this species include Wilson's thrush (named so after Alexander Wilson) and tawny thrush. Up to six subspecies exist, which are grouped into the eastern veery (C. fuscescens fuscescens), the western veery or willow thrush (C. fuscescens salicicolus), and the Newfoundland veery (C. fuscescens fuliginosus).

The specific name fuscescens is Neo-Latin for "blackish", from Latin fuscus, "dark". The English name may imitate the call.

== Description ==
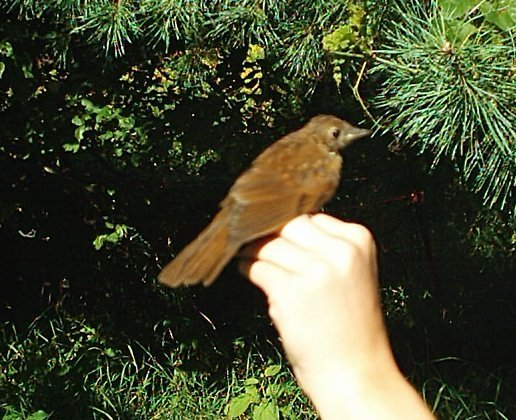
Juvenile, banded near Montreal, Quebec, Canada

Vocalizing. Pleasant Valley Wildlife Sanctuary, Lenox, MA

This species measures 16–19.5 cm (6.3–7.7 in) in length. Its mass is 26–39 g (0.92–1.38 oz), exceptionally up to 54 g (1.9 oz). The wingspan averages 28.5 cm (11.2 in). Each wing measures 8.9–10.4 cm (3.5–4.1 in), the bill measures 1.2–1.9 cm (0.47–0.75 in) and the tarsus is 2.7–3.25 cm (1.06–1.28 in). The veery shows the characteristic under-wing stripe of Catharus thrushes. Adults are mainly light brown on the upperparts. The underparts are white; the breast is light tawny with faint brownish spots. Veeries have pink legs and a poorly defined eye ring. Birds in the eastern portions of the species' breeding range are more cinnamon on the upper parts; western birds are more olive-brown. In the east, the veery is distinguished easily by its coloration; distinguishing western veeries from other Catharus thrushes is more difficult.

Song

This bird has a breezy, downward-spiraling, flute-like song, often given from a low and concealed perch. The most common call is a harsh, descending vee-er, which gave the bird its name. Other calls include a chuckle, a sharp and low "wuck", and a slow wee-u. Veeries have been shown to decrease the rate and duration of singing when exposed to barred owl playback, possibly to decrease the chance of predation.

== Ecology and behavior ==
=== Breeding and wintering habitat ===
The breeding habitat is humid deciduous forest across southern Canada and the northern United States. Breeding habitat includes dense growth and dense understory close to a water source, such as a stream. These birds migrate to eastern South America. It has been found that winter range may include the entire Amazon basin, Mérida state in Venezuela, the headwaters of the Orinoco River, and São Paulo state, Brazil. Stopover regions during migration of several veeries from Delaware include the coast of the Gulf of Mexico, the coasts of the Carolinas, Cuba, Jamaica, Colombia, and Venezuela. They are very rare vagrants to western Europe.

=== Feeding ===
They forage on the forest floor, flipping leaves to uncover insects; they may fly up to catch insects in flight. They mainly eat insects and berries. Insects are a main food source during the breeding season, while fruit and berries may compose most of the diet during the late summer and fall.

=== Nesting ===
They make a cup nest on the ground or near the base of a shrub. The nest consists of three structural layers, including outer, inner, and nest lining layers. The outer layer consists of leaves and supporting branches, while the inner layer consists of material woven together. Nest lining consists of flexible material such as bark, roots, and seeds. The use of different parts of 27 plant species, including invasive/alien plants, has been documented, and nests in exotic plants appear to have similar reproductive success to those in native plants. Nests contain three to five greenish-blue eggs that may or may not have brown spots. The eggs are incubated for 10 to 14 days by the female, while both parents feed nestlings. Young Veeries can leave the nest between 10 and 12 days after they hatch.

This bird has been displaced in some parts of its range by the related wood thrush (Hylocichla mustelina). However, a case of interspecific parental care of a veery nest by a wood thrush has been documented in which a wood thrush provided more parental care to the veery nestlings than did the parents, possibly due to sexual solicitation by the female veery. Veeries are occasional hosts for the eggs of brown-headed cowbirds (Molothrus ater). Veery males have been found to engage in behaviors similar to the polygynandrous Bicknell's thrush in that males may feed nestlings at more than one nest and there may be multiple male feeders at nests.

== Threats ==
Threats to the veery include nest parasitism by brown-headed cowbirds, climate change, and alteration of Amazonian lowland forests. It is suggested that veeries are in decline, and breeding bird survey trend results indicate that veery populations declined across most of its range from 1966 to 2013. There have been concerns that the use of invasive/alien plant parts may decrease nesting success, but negative impacts have not been documented. Other potential threats include the loss of woodland habitat, squirrels, chipmunks, and raptors.
