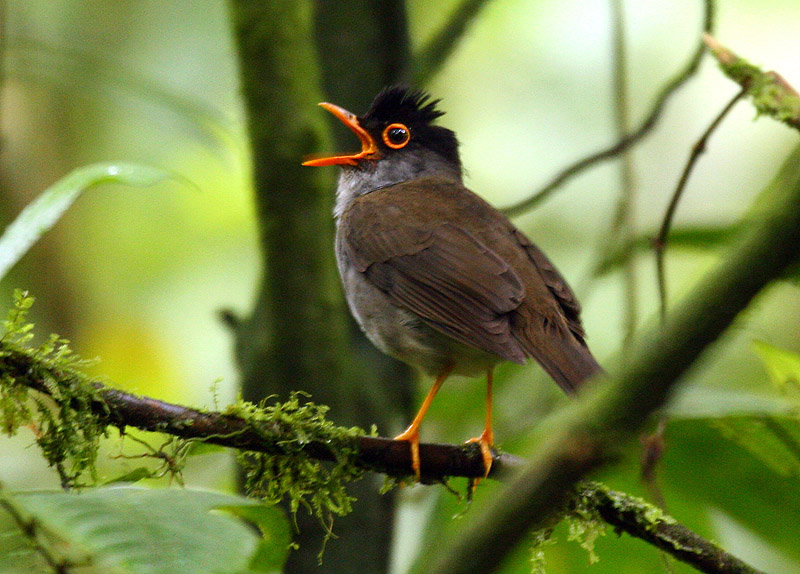
- Black-headed nightingale-thrush (Catharus mexicanus)

Scientific classification
- Kingdom: Animalia
- Phylum: Chordata
- Class: Aves
- Order: Passeriformes
- Family: Turdidae
- Genus: Catharus; Bonaparte, 1850

Type species
- Turdus immaculatus Bonaparte, 1850

= Catharus =

Genus of birds

The genus Catharus is an evolutionary clade of forest-dwelling passerine birds in the family Turdidae (thrushes), commonly known as nightingale-thrushes. The extant species are widely distributed across the Americas and are descended from a common ancestor that lived 4–6 million years ago. Most of the species are shy of humans, seldom leaving the cover of dense forest vegetation, where their activities are hidden from view. Thus, many fundamental aspects of their biology and life histories are poorly known.

Nightingale-thrushes are small omnivorous songbirds that, like their sister species the wood thrush (Hylocichla mustelina), exhibit a variety of migratory and non-migratory habits. Multiple species are long-distance migrants that breed in North America and "winter" in the Neotropics. The breeding range of one migratory species, the gray-cheeked thrush (C. minimus), extends into eastern Siberia. The remainder of the migratory species are restricted to the Americas, notwithstanding occasional vagrant records in Europe and northeast Asia. The non-migratory species are residents of the Neotropical realm.

== Systematics ==
Historically, the migratory and residents were placed in two genera: Hylocichla and Catharus, respectively. However, molecular studies indicate that hermit thrush (C. guttatus) is more closely related to three Neotropical species (C. occidentalis, C. gracilirostris, C. frantzii) than to the long-distance migrants which it superficially resembles. This pattern of homoplasy has been interpreted as evidence that seasonal migration had multiple independent origins in the genus (i.e., convergent evolution of phenotypic characters associated with migration), but a 2025 study proposed that it reflects the "budding" of daughter lineages from a long-lived "stem" lineage in evolutionary stasis (which persists today as C. guttatus).

The taxonomy of Catharus dates to the 18th century and has a confusing history resulting from multiple cryptic species, taxonomic composites, misidentified species, and other historical errors. The name Catharus, authored by Charles Lucien Bonaparte, is derived from the Ancient Greek καθαρός (katharós) meaning "pure" or "clean", and refers to the plumage of the orange-billed nightingale-thrush (C. aurantiirostris).

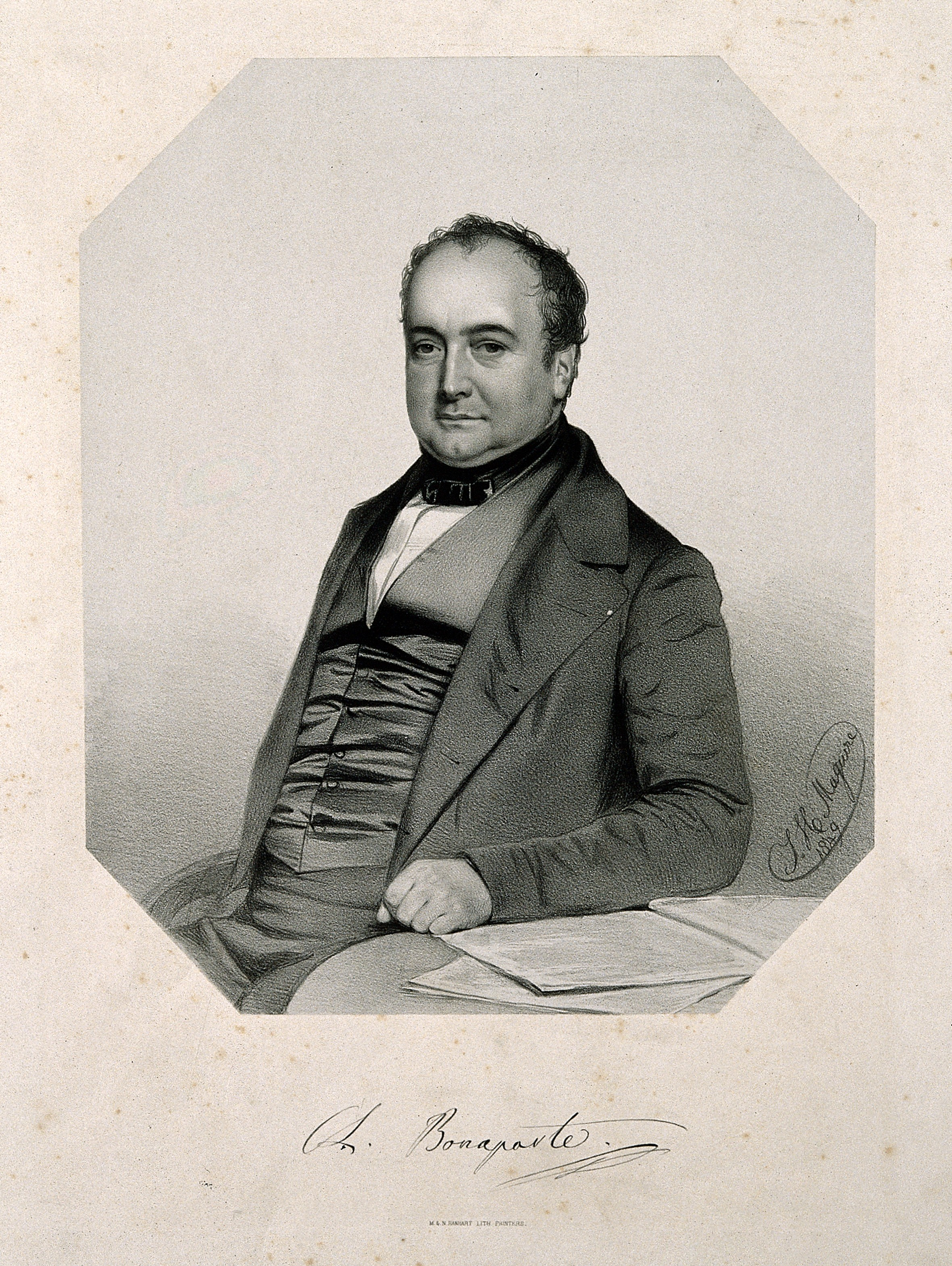
Charles Lucien Bonaparte (1803–1857), who gave the genus Catharus its name in 1850.

Species delimitation in Catharus remains an active topic of study and multiple taxonomic splits have been proposed and/or adopted during the last half century, to recognize long-overlooked cryptic species. For example, evidence supporting the split of C. frantzii and C. occidentalis was published in 1969; evidence supporting the split of C. bicknelli and C. minimus was published in 1993; evidence supporting the split of C. dryas and C. maculatus was published in 2017; evidence supporting the split of C. fuscater into seven species was published in 2023, including a newly described species from Panama called Darien Nightingale-thrush (C. arcanus); and Halley (2025) has recently argued that C. mexicanus should be treated as two species. The sister taxa C. ustulatus and C. swainsoni have also been treated at species rank by some authors. Even with these various splits, a recent study suggests that species diversity in Catharus may still be underestimated.

The nightingale-thrushes, revered for their beautiful songs, have long been compared to the common nightingale (Luscinia megarhynchos). Theodore Roosevelt once remarked that, "In melody, and above all in that finer, higher melody where the chords vibrate with the touch of eternal sorrow, [L. megarhynchos] cannot rank with such singers as the Wood Thrush and Hermit Thrush. The serene, ethereal beauty of the Hermit's song, rising and falling through the still evening under the archways of hoary mountain forests that have endured from time everlasting". A study published in 2014 presented evidence that hermit thrush songs, like human music, tend to be constructed of frequency ratios that are expressed as simple mathematical ratios and follow the harmonic series.

- - Hylocichla mustelina
  - - - - - C. ustulatus
          - C. swainsoni
        - - - C. minimus
            - C. bicknelli
          - C. fuscescens
      - - - - C. guttatus
          - C. occidentalis
        - - C. gracilirostris
          - - C. frantzii
    - - - C. fuscater
        - - C. dryas
          - C. maculatus
      - - C. aurantiirostris
        - C. mexicanus

Molecular phylogeny of Catharus based on Everson et al. (2019) with updates from Halley et al. (2017) and Halley (2019)

== Species ==
Image	Scientific name	Common name	Distribution
	Catharus dryas	Yellow-throated nightingale-thrush	Resident: Middle America.
	Catharus maculatus	Speckled nightingale-thrush (split from C. dryas)	Resident: South America.
	Catharus aurantiirostris	Orange-billed nightingale-thrush	Resident: Mexico to Colombia and Brazil.
	Catharus mexicanus	Black-headed nightingale-thrush	Resident: Mexico to Costa Rica.
	Catharus fuscater	Slaty-backed nightingale-thrush	Resident: Costa Rica to Bolivia.
	Catharus swainsoni	Swainson's thrush	Migratory: breeds in North America, winters in Central and South America.
	Catharus gracilirostris	Black-billed nightingale-thrush	Resident: Costa Rica and Panama.
	Catharus guttatus	Hermit thrush	Migratory: breeds and winters in North America.
	Catharus occidentalis	Russet nightingale-thrush	Resident: Mexico.
	Catharus frantzii	Ruddy-capped nightingale-thrush	Resident: Mexico to Panama.
	Catharus minimus	Gray-cheeked thrush	Migratory: breeds in North America, winters in South America
	Catharus bicknelli	Bicknell's thrush	Migratory: breeds in northeastern North America, winters in Hispaniola
	Catharus fuscescens	Veery	Migratory: breeds in North America, winters in South America
