= Swainson's thrush =

- Olive-backed thrush
- Russet-backed thrush

Conservation status
- Least Concern (IUCN 3.1)

Scientific classification
- Kingdom: Animalia
- Phylum: Chordata
- Class: Aves
- Order: Passeriformes
- Family: Turdidae
- Genus: Catharus
- Species: C. ustulatus

Binomial name
- Catharus ustulatus (Nuttall, 1840)
- Breeding Migration Nonbreeding

Synonyms
- Hylocichla swainsonii

Audio

Species of bird

Swainson's thrush (Catharus ustulatus), also called olive-backed thrush, russet-backed thrush, and salmonberry bird is a medium-sized thrush. It is a member of genus Catharus and is typical of it in terms of its subdued coloration and beautiful, ascending flute-like voice. Swainson's thrush was named after William Swainson, an English ornithologist.

== Etymology ==
The genus name Catharus comes from the Ancient Greek katharos, "pure or clean" and refers to the plumage of the orange-billed nightingale-thrush C. aurantiirostris. The specific ustulatus is Latin for "burnt", from urere, "to burn".

== Habitat ==
The breeding habitat of Swainson's thrush is coniferous woods with dense undergrowth across Canada, Alaska, and the northern United States; also, deciduous wooded areas on the Pacific coast of North America.

== Range and distribution ==
These birds migrate to southern Mexico and as far south as Argentina. The coastal subspecies migrate down the Pacific coast of North America and winter from Mexico to Costa Rica, whereas the continental birds migrate eastwards within North America (a substantial detour) and then travel southwards via Florida to winter from Panama to Bolivia. Swainson's thrush is a very rare vagrant to western Europe. It has also occurred as a vagrant in northeast Asia.

== Threats ==
Though it is a species of "least concern" by the IUCN, the Swainson's thrush's population has decreased by about 38% between 1966 and 2014. This species is negatively impacted by habitat loss, climate change, and window collisions.

Moreover, this species may be displaced by the hermit thrush where their ranges overlap. Possibly, the latter species adapts more readily to human encroachment upon its habitat. Swainson's thrushes tend to keep away from areas of human construction and other activity, preferring densely vegetated habitat.

== Description ==
This species is 16–20 cm (6.3–7.9 in) in length. The wingspan averages at 30 cm (12 in) and the wing chord is 8.7–10.5 cm (3.4–4.1 in). The bill measures 1.5–1.9 cm (0.59–0.75 in) in length and the tarsus is 2.5 to 3.1 cm (0.98 to 1.22 in) long. This species' body mass can range from 23 to 45 g (0.81 to 1.59 oz). This thrush has the white-dark-white underwing pattern characteristic of Catharus thrushes. Adults are brown on the upperparts. The underparts are white with brown on the flanks; the breast is lighter brown with darker spots. They have pink legs and a light brown eye ring. Birds in the east are more olive-brown on the upperparts; western birds are more reddish brown. This bird's song is a hurried series of flute-like tones spiralling upwards.

== Diet ==
They forage on the forest floor, also in trees. Swainson's thrushes mainly eat insects, fruits and berries. (Note: Out of the wide range of fruit eaten by this bird, those of Cymbopetalum mayanum (Annonaceae) and especially Trophis racemosa (Moraceae) are well-liked whenever available in the winter quarters. However, they are generally not taken from feeders or disturbed habitat.) They make a cup nest on a horizontal tree branch.

A study in the White Mountains of New Hampshire found that Swainson's thrushes eat different insects depending on their elevation, with detritivores, particularly woodlice and ghost spiders, making up more of their diet at higher elevations. These prey items are generally more abundant at higher elevations but are also more nutrient-poor.

Its song is said by local tribes to make salmonberries ripen, including the Saanich people who claim the bird says, "xwexwelexwelexwelexwesh!" meaning "ripen, ripen, ripen, ripen!" A similar belief appears among the Tlingit, Haida, Haisla, Oweekeno, Kwakwaka'wakw, Nuu-Chah-Nulth, Ditidaht, Sḵwx̱wú7mesh, and the Straits Salish people.

== Subspecies ==
Four subspecies are recognised, Catharus ustulatus alame, C. u. swainsoni, C. u. ustulatus and C. u. oedicus. Subspecies C. u. alame and C. u. swainsoni summer east of the British Columbian Coast Mountains, the Cascades and the Sierra Nevada, while C. u. ustulatus and C. u. oedicus (sometimes known as russet-backed thrushes) summer west of these ranges. There is a small area of overlap in the Coast Mountains. Recent molecular systematics work confirms that these two pairs of subspecies form two genetically distinct clades, referred to as the continental and coastal clades, which diverged during the Late Pleistocene era, probably about 10,000 years ago as the last ice age came to its end and habitats shifted across North America.

The genetic differences between the subspecies, and the circuitous migratory route of the continental birds, strongly suggest that these species underwent a rapid range expansion following the end of the last ice age, with populations originally summering in the south-east of North America expanding their ranges northwards and westwards as the ice retreated. Details of the molecular genetic analysis support the hypothesis of rapid expansion of both coastal and continental populations. The current migratory routes of the continental birds, especially the western populations, are not optimal in ecological terms, and presumably represent an inherited, historical route pattern that has not yet adapted to the birds' modern population locations.

These results notwithstanding, analysis of mtDNA cytochrome b and NADH dehydrogenase subunit 2 as well as nuclear β-fibrinogen intron 7 sequence data shows that Swainson's thrush is the most ancient North American species of its genus; it is not closely related to other Catharus and the outward similarities with the other North American species are due to convergent evolution.

== Gallery ==
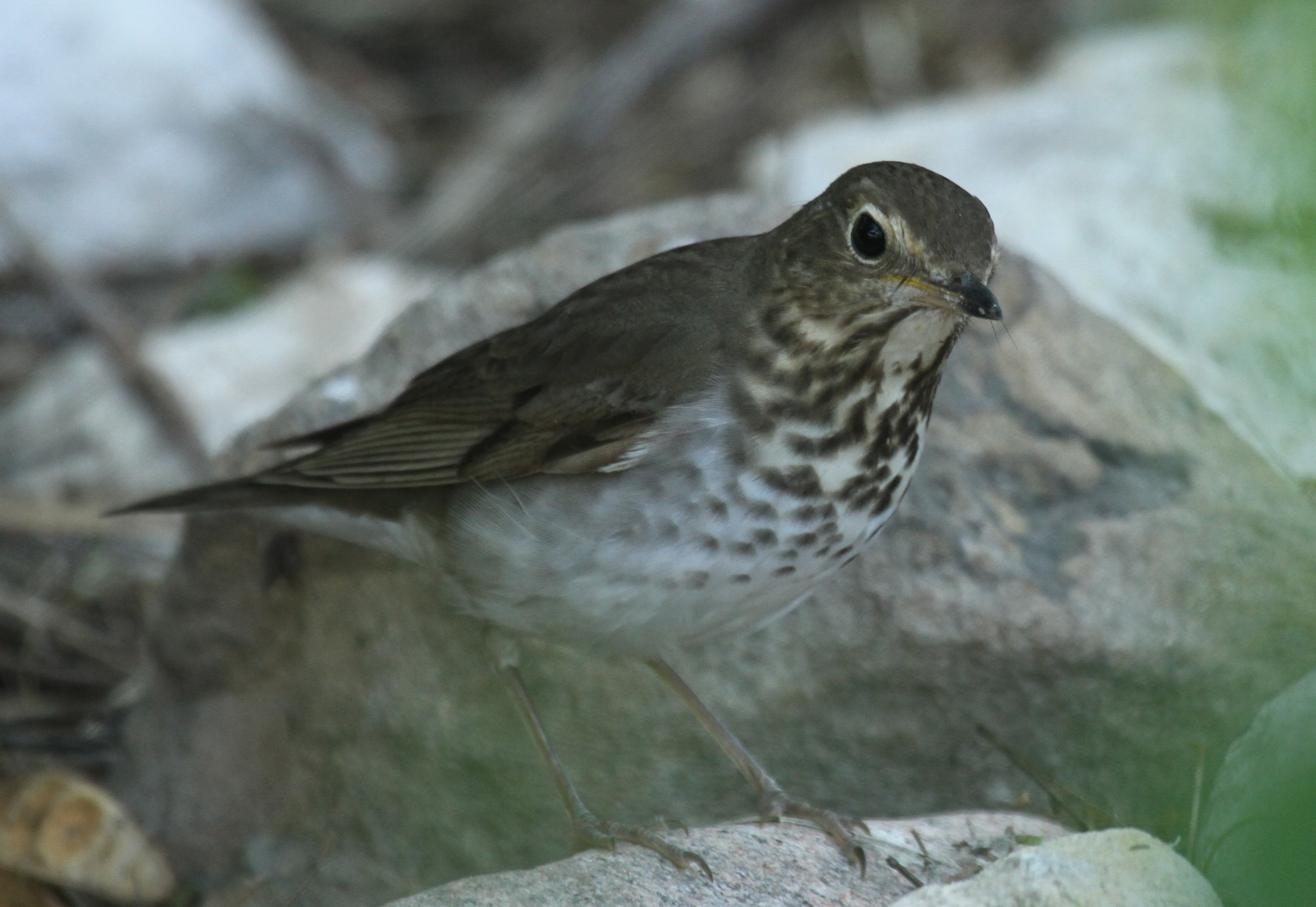
Swainson's thrush on South Padre Island, Texas

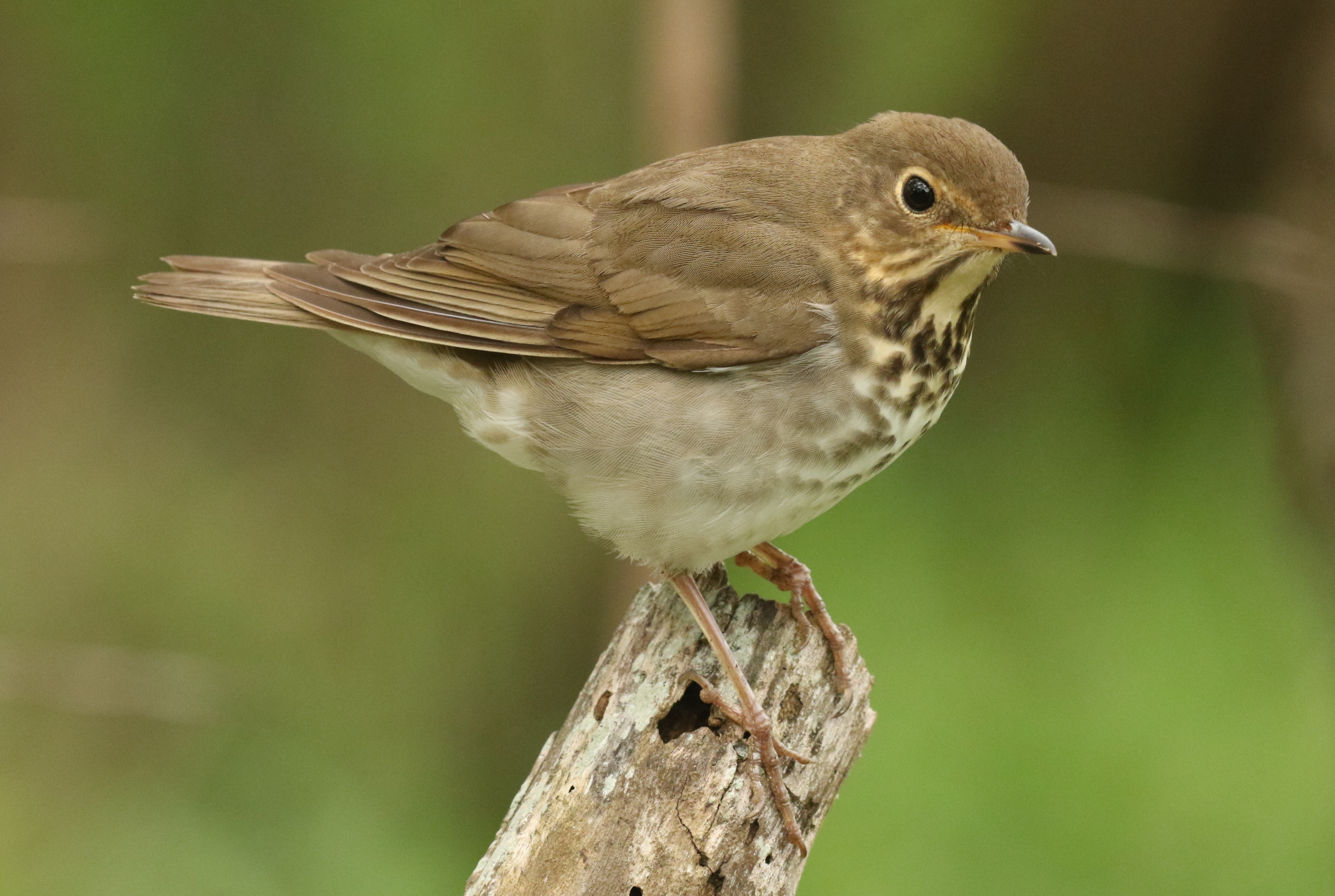
On South Padre Island, Texas

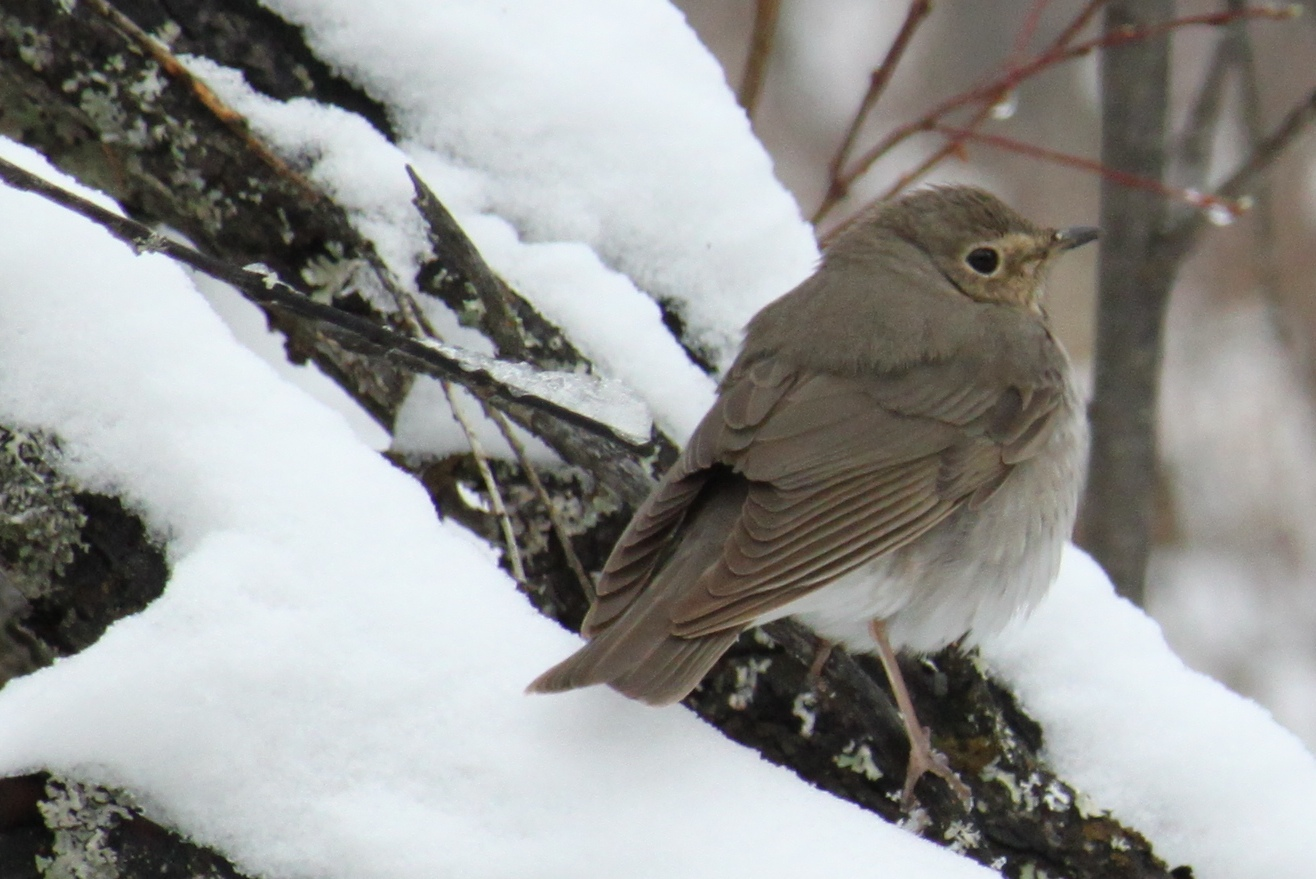
A Swainson's thrush in British Columbia

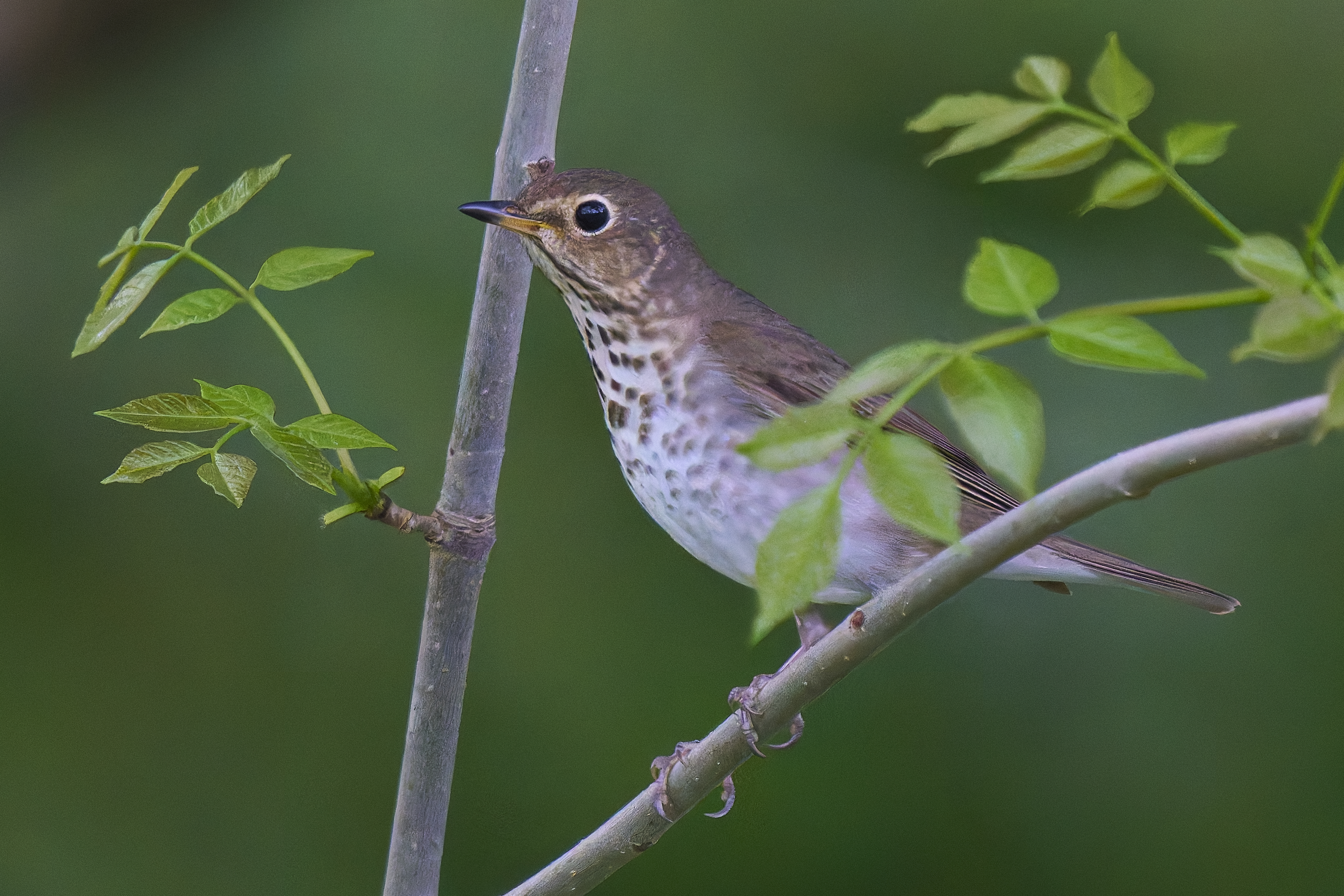
Massachusetts

Russet-backed in Seward Park, Seattle
