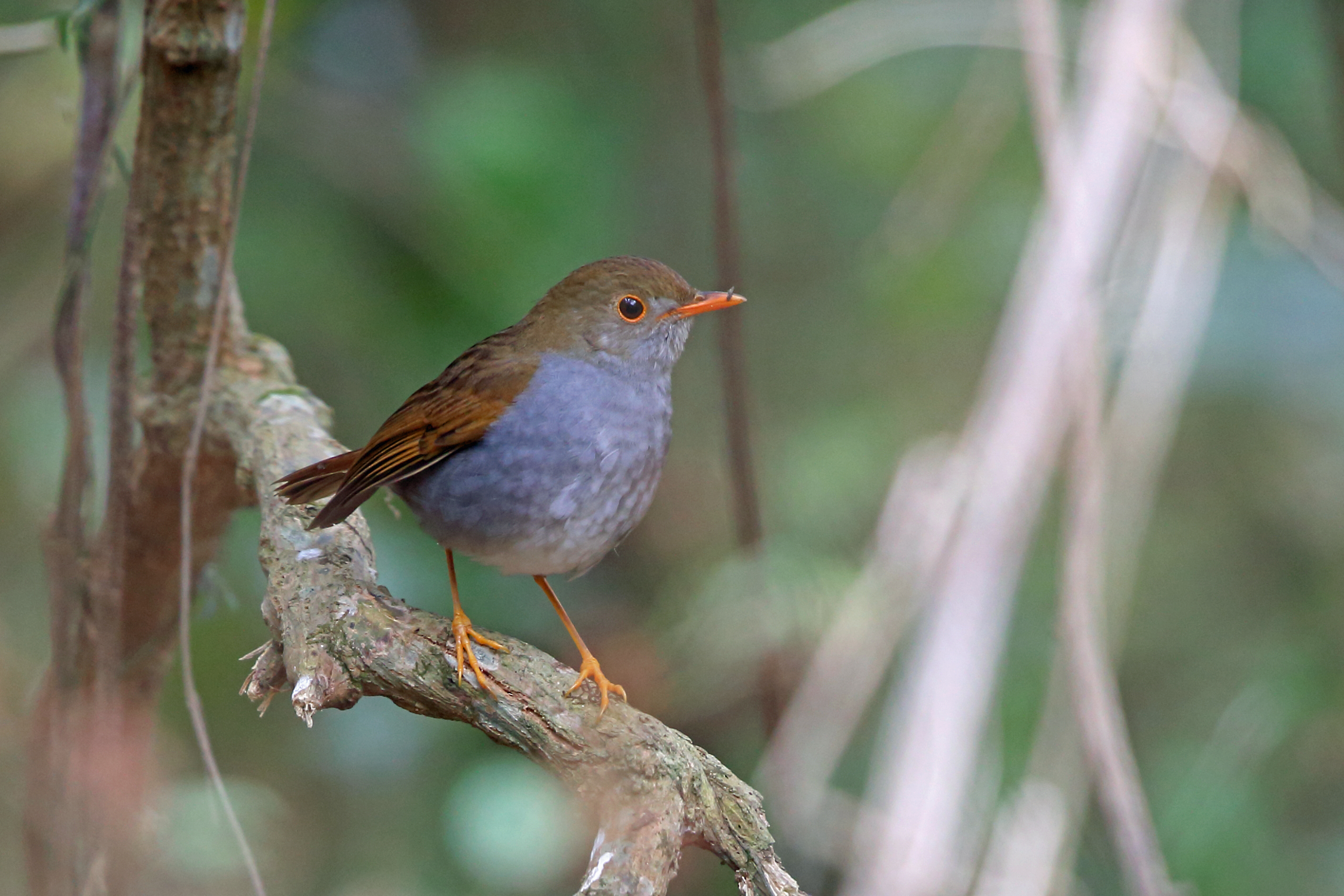

Conservation status
- Least Concern (IUCN 3.1)

Scientific classification
- Kingdom: Animalia
- Phylum: Chordata
- Class: Aves
- Order: Passeriformes
- Family: Turdidae
- Genus: Catharus
- Species: C. aurantiirostris

Binomial name
- Catharus aurantiirostris (Hartlaub, 1850)

= Orange-billed nightingale-thrush =

Species of bird

The orange-billed nightingale-thrush (Catharus aurantiirostris) is a species of bird in the family Turdidae, the thrushes and allies. It is found from northern Mexico through Central America (except Belize) into northern South America. In addition it has been documented in Brazil and as a vagrant to the United States.

== Taxonomy and systematics ==
The orange-billed nightingale-thrush was originally described in 1850 as Turdus aurantiirostris. It was later reassigned to its present genus Catharus that had been erected that same year.

The further taxonomy of the orange-billed nightingale-thrush is unsettled. The IOC, AviList, and BirdLife International's Handbook of the Birds of the World assign it these 11 subspecies:

- C. a. clarus Jouy, 1894
- C. a. melpomene (Cabanis, 1851)
- C. a. costaricensis Hellmayr, 1902
- C. a. griseiceps Salvin, 1866
- C. a. phaeopleurus Sclater, PL & Salvin, 1876
- C. a. aurantiirostris (Hartlaub, 1850)
- C. a. birchalli Seebohm, 1881
- C. a. barbaritoi Aveledo & Ginés, 1952
- C. a. sierrae Hellmayr, 1919
- C. a. inornatus Zimmer, JT, 1944
- C. a. insignis Zimmer, JT, 1944

The Clements taxonomy adds three more subspecies, C. a. aenopennis, C. a. bangsi, and C. a. russatus. The other taxonomies include them in C. a. clarus, C. a. melpomene, and C. a. griseiceps respectively. Clements subdivides the species into the "brown-headed group" (C. a. clarus, C. a. melpomene, and C. a. costaricensis [plus aenopennis and bangsi]), the "gray-headed group" (C. a. griseiceps and C. a. phaeopleurus [plus russatus]), and the "orange-billed group" (the remaining six subspecies). The Cornell Lab of Ornithology's Birds of the World recognizes the same three groups. The American Ornithological Society (AOS) recognizes the "gray-headed" group but combines the "brown-headed" and "orange-billed" groups.

Some early twentieth century authors treated the members of the "gray-headed" group as a separate species.

This article follows the 11-subspecies model.

== Description ==
The orange-billed nightingale-thrush is 15.5 to 17 cm (6.1 to 6.7 in) long and weighs 21 to 32 g (0.74 to 1.1 oz). The sexes have the same plumage. Adults of the nominate subspecies C. a. aurantiirostris are olive-brown with a rufous tinge on their crown, nape, back, rump, wings, and tail. The rufous is strongest on the last three areas. Their face is grayish brown with a thin orange eye-ring. Their throat is whitish that darkens to pale gray on the rest of the underparts. They have a long, strong, orange bill and brownish orange legs and feet. Juveniles are mostly brown with much buff flecking and mottling.

The other subspecies differ from the nominate and each other thus:

- C. a. clarus: warm olive-brown upperparts
- C. a. melpomene: more rufous on wings and tail
- C. a. costaricensis: richer rufous on wings and tail than melpomene
- C. a. griseiceps: gray head; grayer underparts
- C. a. phaeopleurus: like griseiceps with stronger olive-brown upperparts and orange-red bill
- C. a. birchalli: more rufous with darker gray flanks
- C. a. barbaritoi: no rufous on upperparts; darker grayish underparts
- C. a. sierrae: like the nominate
- C. a. inornatus: stronger olive-brown upperparts with whiter throat and underparts than griseiceps but with no rufous; orange-red bill
- C. a. insignis: duller than nominate with vague streaks on the throat

== Distribution and habitat ==
The orange-billed nightingale-thrush has a disjunct distribution The subspecies are found thus:

- C. a. clarus: Mexico from southwestern Chihuahua south to western Puebla and southwestern Tamaulipas
- C. a. melpomene: from Puebla and Veracruz in southern Mexico south through Guatemala and El Salvador and across Honduras
- C. a. costaricensis: northwestern and central Costa Rica
- C. a. griseiceps: from southwestern Costa Rica into western Panama as far as Chiriquí and Veraguas provinces
- C. a. phaeopleurus: central Colombia
- C. a. aurantiirostris: Venezuelan Coastal Range and inland in Guárico
- C. a. birchalli: Trinidad and northeastern Venezuelan states of Anzoátegui, Sucre, and northern Monagas
- C. a. barbaritoi Serranía del Perijá on the Colombia-Venezuela border
- C. a. sierrae northern Colombia's isolated Sierra Nevada de Santa Marta
- C. a. inornatus: western slope of Colombia's Eastern Andes in Santander Department
- C. a. insignis: eastern slopes of Colombia's Western and Central Andes

The South American Classification Committee has documented records of the species in Brazil. There are two records in the United States. One bird was photographed in southern Texas in 1996. The other was photographed in South Dakota in 2010; the record was accepted by the South Dakota Ornithologists' Union.

The orange-billed nightingale-thrush inhabits a variety of forest types in the upper tropical and subtropical zones. These include the edges of both lowland and montane evergreen forest and the interior of pine-oak forest, deciduous forest, and secondary forest. In Central and South America it also occurs in semi-deciduous forest, gardens, coffee plantations, and (at least in Venezuela) urban areas. Sources differ on its elevational range. One states it is overall from 400 to 2,300 m (1,300 to 7,500 ft) and another from 600 to 2,500 m (2,000 to 8,200 ft). It ranges from 600 to 2,850 m (2,000 to 9,400 ft) in Guatemala and Honduras, 500 to 2,200 m (1,600 to 7,200 ft) in Costa Rica, 900 to 1,650 m (3,000 to 5,400 ft) in Panama, 600 to 2,300 m (2,000 to 7,500 ft) in Colombia, and 800 to 2,900 m (2,600 to 9,500 ft) in Venezuela.

== Behavior ==
=== Movement ===
The orange-billed nightingale thrush is a year-round resident in most of its range. Much of the population on the Pacific slope of Mexico moves from the highlands to near sea level for the winter, and birds in the more northern part of Mexico are thought to move south for the same period.

=== Feeding ===
The orange-billed nightingale-thrush feeds on invertebrates such as insects, spiders, and worms and also on seeds and berries. It forages in the forest understory and on the ground, where it flips over leaf litter. It has been observed following army ant swarms on Trinidad.

=== Breeding ===
The orange-billed nightingale-thrush's breeding season has not been fully defined but includes April to September in Mexico, March to August in Costa Rica, March to July in Colombia, and May on Trinidad. It builds a bulky cup nest from moss, rootlets, and coarse grass with a lining of finer materials. Most are built in a shrub, thicket, or other dense site between about 1 and 2 m (3 and 7 ft) above the ground. The clutch is two or three eggs that are pale blue to greenish white with reddish brown and pale lilac markings. The incubation period is 13 to 15 days and fledging occurs 13 to 17 days after hatch. Details of parental care are not known.

=== Vocalization ===
The orange-billed nightingale thrush usually sings from dense cover. Its song varies among the subspecies. In northern Central America it is "a scratchy warbling series of sharp whistles and buzzes:chit-TSEE!-tah'wert-PEE'tseee-Cheet or TSIP!-Tseee-cheet-tsee'weet". There its calls are "a sharp, high-pitched whistle, tsseeeeeee" and, as a contact call, "a catlike rreeahhhh". A typical song in Venezuela is "a rather jerky, sputtering spits, BE-ja-a-Filbert" and its call "a nasal, scolding ra-a-a-a-a". In Colombia its song has been written as "wa-trípsee-spit-wachee".

== Status ==
The IUCN has assessed the orange-billed nightingale-thrush as being of Least Concern. It has a very large range; its estimated population of at least 500,000 mature individuals is believed to be decreasing. No immediate threats have been identified. It is considered fairly common to common in most of its range and common in southern Mexico. It is considered common in northern Central America, fairly common in Costa Rica, Panama, and Colombia, and "fairly common but locally distributed" in Venezuela.
