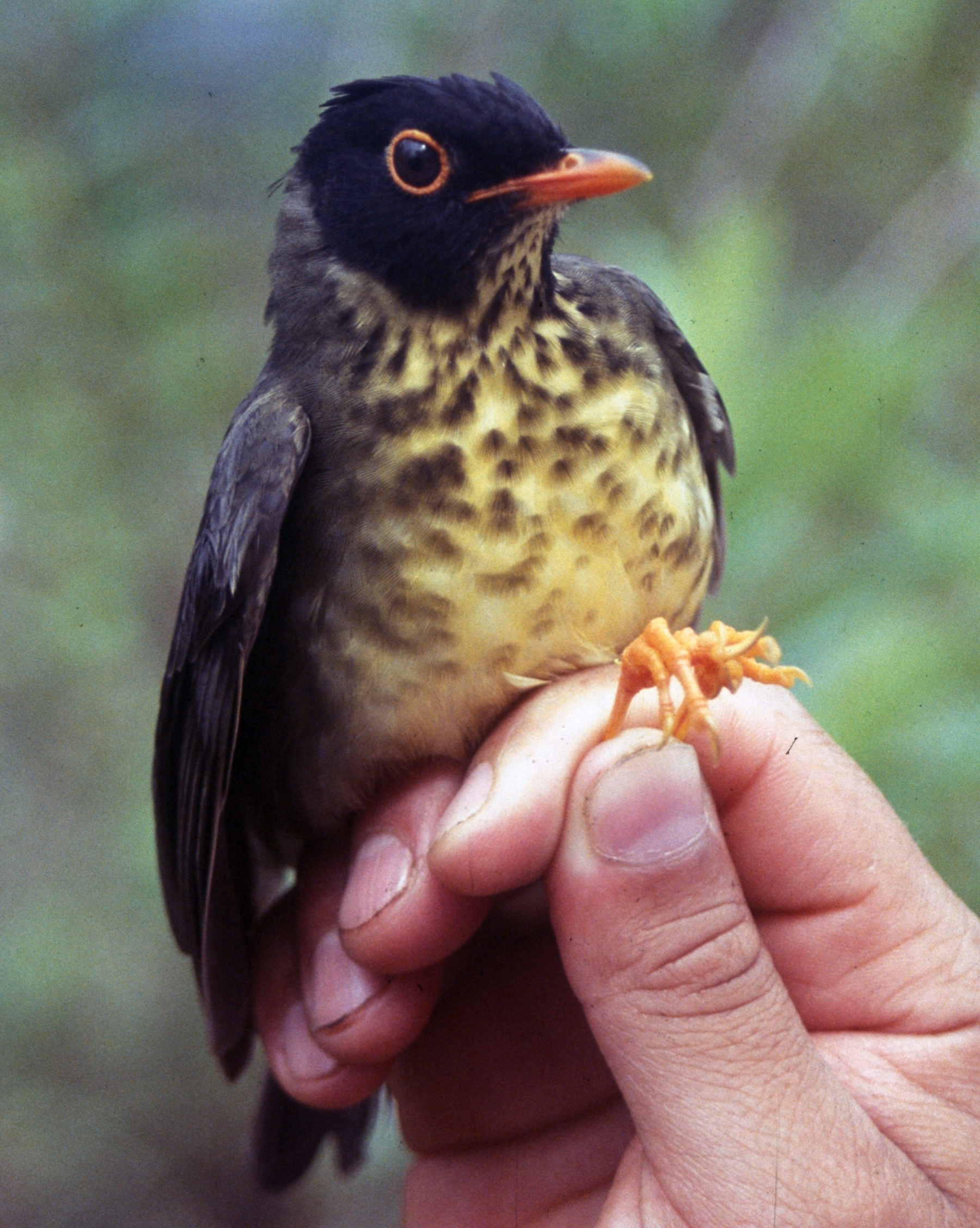

Conservation status
- Least Concern (IUCN 3.1)

Scientific classification
- Kingdom: Animalia
- Phylum: Chordata
- Class: Aves
- Order: Passeriformes
- Family: Turdidae
- Genus: Catharus
- Species: C. maculatus

Binomial name
- Catharus maculatus (Sclater, PL, 1858)

Synonyms
- See text

= Speckled nightingale-thrush =

Species of bird

The speckled nightingale-thrush or Sclater's nightingale-thrush (Catharus maculatus) is a species of bird in the family Turdidae, the thrushes and allies. It is found from Colombia and Venezuela to Bolivia.

== Taxonomy and systematics ==
What is now the speckled nightingale-thrush was originally described by Philip Sclater in 1858 as Malacocichla maculatus. In 1859 Sclater reassigned it to its present genus Catharus. In 1879 some authors advocated including it as a subspecies within Cantharus dryas; the combined species was later called the "spotted nightingale-thrush". Following a study of the species' vocalizations published in 2017, taxonomic systems began separating them. C. dryas was renamed the yellow-throated nightingale-thrush.

The speckled nightingale-thrush has two subspecies, the nominate C. m. maculatus (Sclater, PL, 1858) and C. m. blakei (Olrog, 1973).

== Description ==
The speckled nightingale-thrush is 17 to 19 cm (6.7 to 7.5 in) long and weighs 36 to 44 g (1.3 to 1.6 oz). Adult males of the nominate subspecies have a mostly black head with an orange eye-ring. Their upperparts are dark olive. Their throat, breast, and belly are deep apricot-yellow heavy with dusky spots and their flanks grayish. Adult females are dark grayish on the back of their crown and head. Subspecies C. m. blakei has a buffy throat but is otherwise like the nominate. Both subspecies have a dark iris, an orange bill, and orange legs and feet.

== Distribution and habitat ==
The speckled nightingale-thrush has a disjunct distribution. The nominate subspecies is the more northerly of the two and has a much larger range than C. m. blakei. It is found in a few locations on both slopes of the Andes in Venezuela, from which its range continues on the eastern slope through Colombia, Ecuador, and Peru into western Bolivia. It is also found separately in the Serranía del Perijá that straddles the Colombia-Venezuela border. A third range begins in Colombia's Central Andes and continues south on the western Andean slope through Ecuador into extreme northwestern Peru's Tumbes Department. Subspecies C. m. blakei is found from southern Bolivia into northern Argentina's Jujuy and Salta provinces.

The speckled nightingale-thrush primarily inhabits humid tropical and subtropical forest where it favors the undergrowth in damp ravines and areas along forest streams. In elevation it ranges between 900 and 2,200 m (3,000 and 7,200 ft) in Venezuela, between 600 and 2,200 m (2,000 and 7,200 ft) in Colombia, mostly between 650 and 1,800 m (2,100 and 5,900 ft) but lower in the west in Ecuador, and between 700 and 1,800 m (2,300 and 5,900 ft) in the eastern Peruvian Andes and at about 400 m (1,300 ft) in Tumbes.

== Behavior ==
=== Movement ===
The speckled nightingale-thrush is a year-round resident though some individuals apparently make some seasonal elevational movements at least in Ecuador.

=== Feeding ===
The speckled nightingale-thrush's diet has not been studied. It forages low in the forest understory and on the ground. It sometimes attends army ant swarms.

=== Breeding ===
The speckled nightingale-thrush's breeding season has not been defined but includes April in Ecuador, September in Peru, and February in both Peru and Bolivia. The typical clutch is two eggs that are bluish white speckled with rust and gray. Nothing else is known about the species' breeding biology.

=== Vocalization ===
One description of the speckled nightingale's song is "a beautiful series of short musical phrases that proceed with relatively brief pauses, e.g., tru-lee?...cheelolee...troloweé...cheetrelelee...trolowe". Another is "a series of various musical trills interspersed with more whistled phrases, for example zeee...che'e'e...tur'r'r...tooHEEuur...tre'e'e...". Its call is "a quiet, rising, mewed rhee?".

== Status ==
The IUCN has assessed the speckled nightingale-thrush as being of Least Concern. It has a large range; its population size is not known and is believed to be stable. No immediate threats have been identified. It is a "very local resident" in Venezuela, "fairly common" in Colombia, and "uncommon" in Peru. It is fairly common in eastern Ecuador and "more numerous" in the west. It occurs in at least one national park in each of Colombia and Ecuador.
