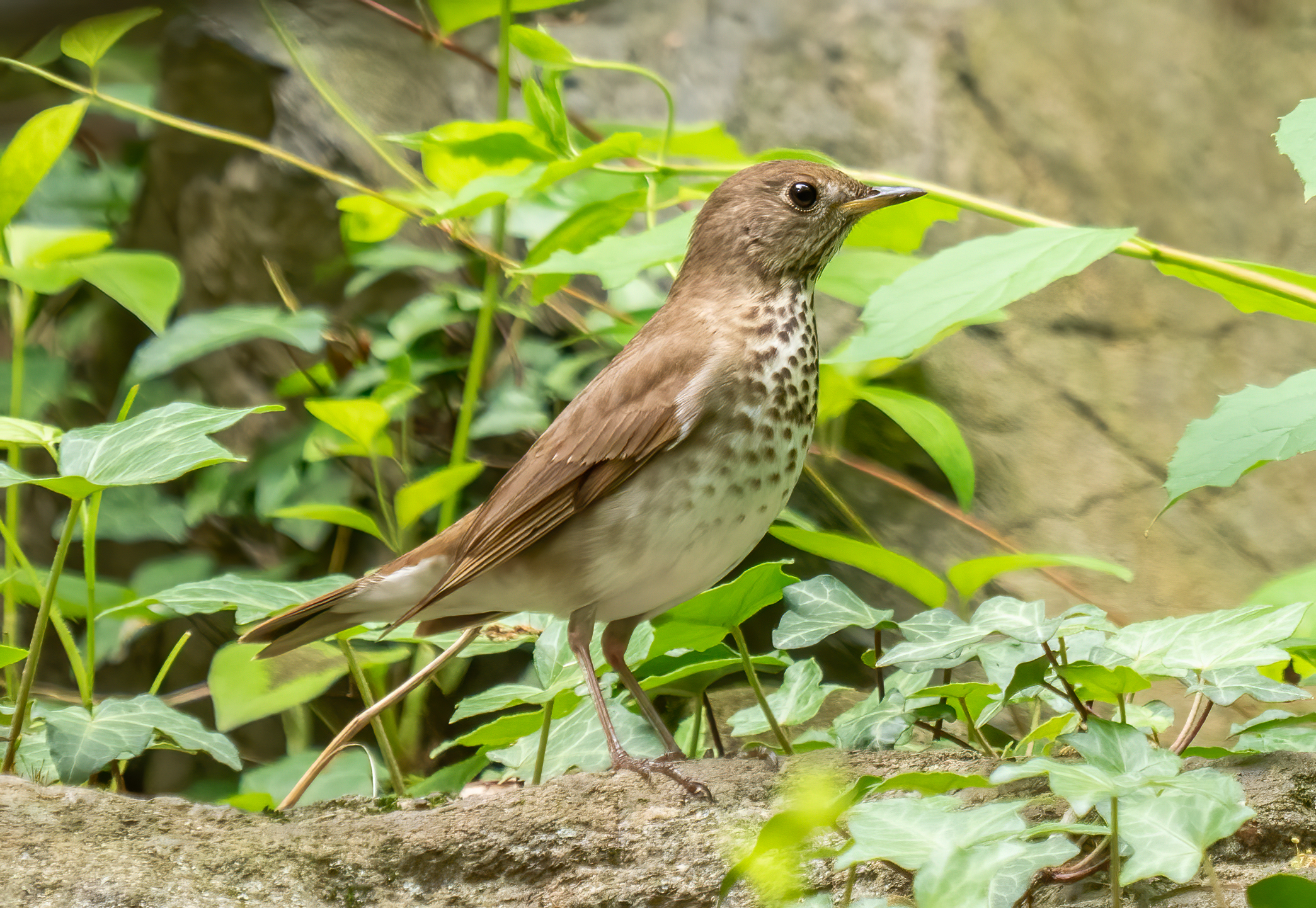

Conservation status
- Least Concern (IUCN 3.1)

Scientific classification
- Kingdom: Animalia
- Phylum: Chordata
- Class: Aves
- Order: Passeriformes
- Family: Turdidae
- Genus: Catharus
- Species: C. minimus

Binomial name
- Catharus minimus (Lafresnaye, 1848)

Synonyms
- Hylocichla aliciae

= Gray-cheeked thrush =

Species of bird

The gray-cheeked thrush (Catharus minimus) is a medium-sized thrush. This species is 15–17 cm (5.9–6.7 in) in length, and has the white-dark-white underwing pattern characteristic of Catharus thrushes. It is a member of a close-knit group of migrant species together with the veery and Bicknell's thrush; it forms a cryptic species pair with the latter. The gray-cheeked thrush is all but indistinguishable from Bicknell's thrush except by its slightly larger size and different song. The two were formerly considered conspecific. Of all the American spotted thrushes, the gray-cheeked has the most northern breeding range.

== Description ==
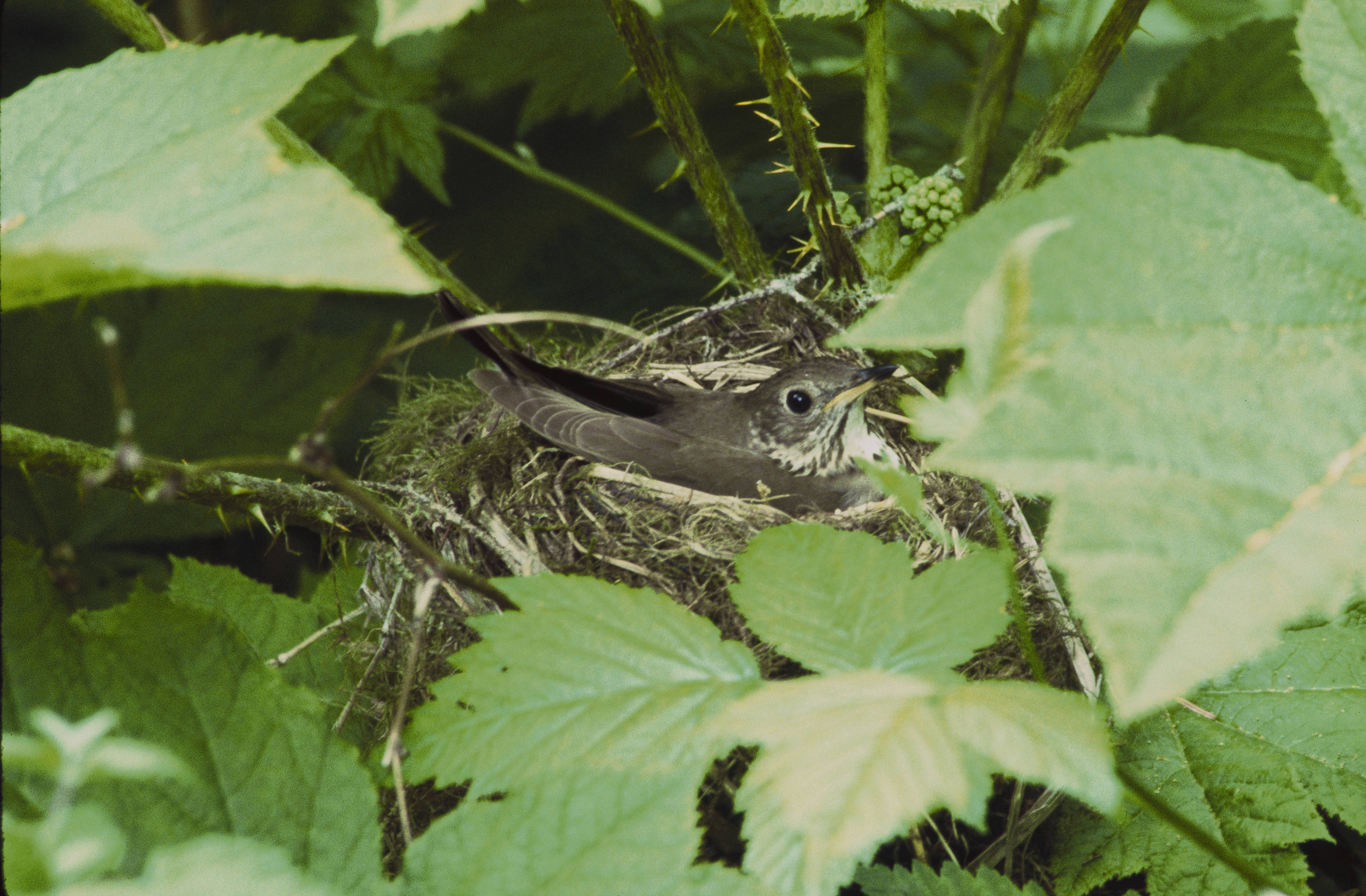
Gray-cheeked thrush in a nest

The gray-cheeked thrush is slightly larger than other Catharus thrushes, about 16 to 17 cm (6.7 in) in height and weighing between 26 and 30g. Wingspan ranges from 12.6-13.4 in (32-34 cm). The bird can be identified by its grayish face, partial pale eyering, drab gray-brown upperside and extensively dusky flanks. The area between the eye and the beak is grayish as well, but the area running from the beak to above the eye is grayish white. The gray-cheeked thrush is nearly identical to the Bicknell's Thrush.

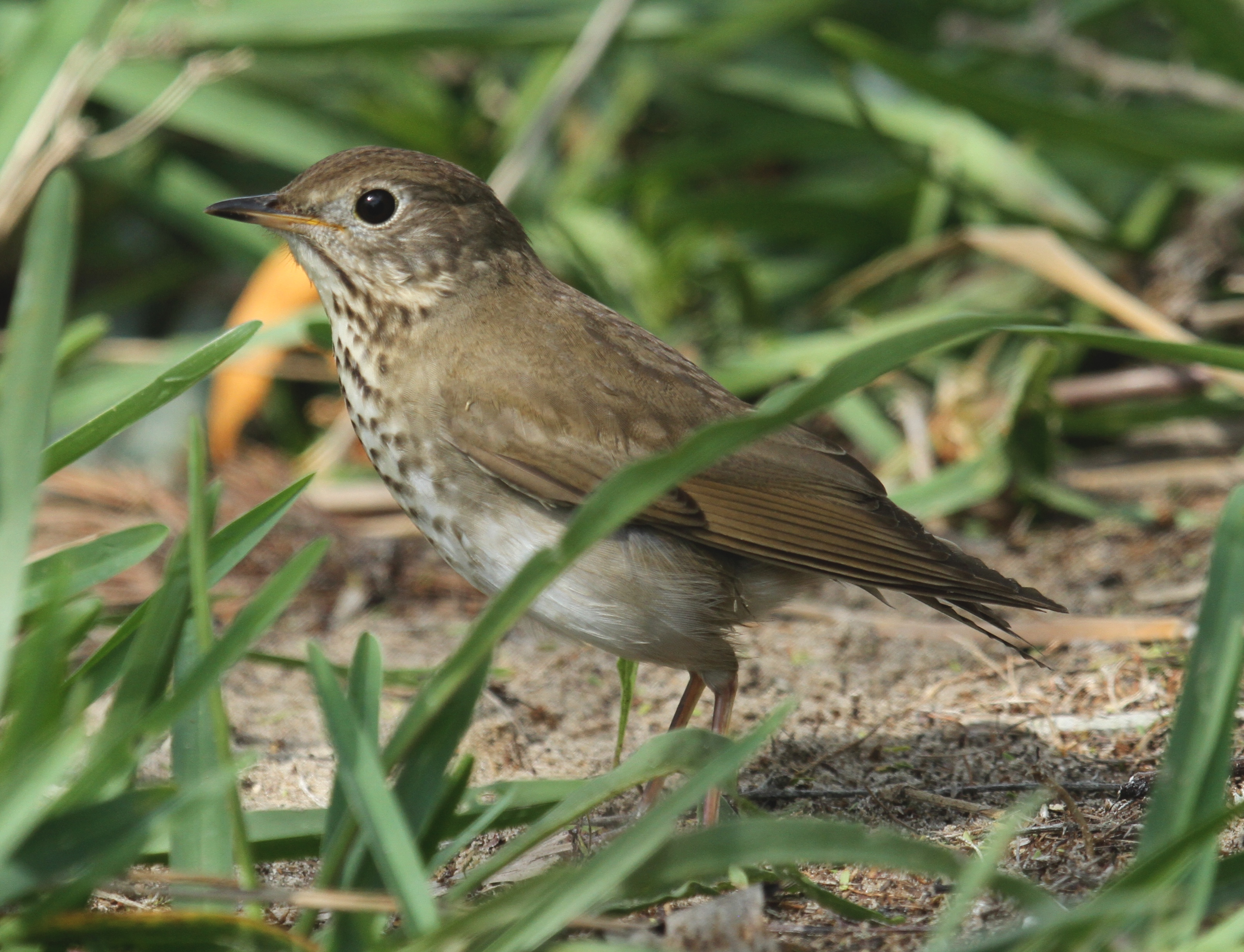
South Padre Island - Texas

There are two subspecies: the northern gray-cheeked thrush (Catharus minimus aliciae), and the nominate subspecies, the Newfoundland gray-cheeked thrush (C. m. minimus). C. m. minimus can be distinguished by its overall browner coloration and buffer wash to the breast compared to C. m. aliciae. C. m. minimus also has an extensive brighter yellow area at the base of the lower part of the beak. C. m. aliciae has a grayish olive upperpart (whereas C. m. minimus has a brownish olive upperpart) and flanks, a lightly washed cream breast and duller lower part of the beak.

== Taxonomy ==
In addition to being almost identical physically, the gray-cheeked thrush is sister species to the Bicknell's thrush (Catharus bicknelli). The divergence of the two species is very recent since only little genetic divergence separate them. Dr. Henri Ouellet was the first to propose the separation between the Bicknell's and the gray-cheeked thrush in 1996.

== Habitat and distribution ==
The gray-cheeked thrush is a long-distance migrant species with a migration on average of 3000 km. They are believed to spend their winter in the Amazon basin and will cross the Caribbean Sea and Gulf of Mexico during their spring migration.

They are present in their breeding ground from May to August. They breeding range includes the northern boreal forests from Newfoundland to Alaska in North America and across the Bering Sea to Eastern Siberia associated with dense conifer and broadleaf shrub thickets. C. minimus remains uncommon to rare in most regions of North America but can be spotted in any wooded habitat. The breeding range extends north of the treeline into low Arctic willow and alder beds. Grey-cheeked thrushes prefer low coniferous woods, including young regenerating forests, open canopy old growth forests having a dense growth of shrubs and small conifers in the understory, and dense, stunted spruce and fir on windblown sites and near the tree line.

The subspecies of C. minimus are also separated by their different breeding ranges: C. m. aliciae breeds from Labrador west to Siberia, and C. m. minimus breeds on the island of Newfoundland and possibly adjacent portions of southern coastal Labrador.

== Behavior ==
=== Vocalizations ===
The vocalizations of the gray-cheeked thrush are the most reliable way to identify it, compared to the Bicknell's Thrush. It has a complex song of burry flute-like notes, usually inflecting downward at the end. It resembles a descending spiral like the veery (Catharus fuscescens), but higher, thinner, and nasal with stuttering pauses: "ch-ch zreeew zi-zi-zreeee zizreeew". The flight call is a high, penetrating, nasal "queer". It is more likely to hear its nocturnal flight call during spring and fall migration than to observe the species on the ground. The nocturnal flight note a one or two note "whe-eer" dropping in pitch.

=== Diet ===
C. minimus consumes mainly insects, such as beetles, weevils, ants, wasps, and caterpillars, in addition to arachnids as well as fruits and berries (wild cherries, blackberries, and raspberries). It also feeds on crayfish, sow bugs, and earthworms.

Their habits of eating berries contribute to the dispersion of seeds.

=== Reproduction ===
C. minimus exhibits secretive behaviour during breeding season, and nesting pairs are rarely found in high densities as their territories are well-spaced. They build their nests on the ground or in low shrubs, typically less than 2 meters high. Females build the nest with dried grasses mixed with a supporting layer of mud. There is only one brood per season, although they will lay a second brood if the first nest fails early in the season.

There is an average of 4 eggs per nest, but it may vary between 3 and 5 eggs. The female incubates the eggs for 13 to 14 days. The eggs are greenish blue, marked with light brown dots and oval to short oval in shape. Nestlings fledge 11 to 13 days after hatching and the young are cared for by both parents. Individuals breed at one year of age and are presumed monogamous.
