= Allan Robert Phillips =

American ornithologist (1914–1996)

- Born: October 25, 1914; New York City, US
- Died: January 26, 1996 (aged 81); San Nicolás de los Garza, Nuevo León, Mexico
- Education: PhD from Cornell University in 1946
- Occupation: Ornithologist
- Spouse: Juana Farfán Bautista de Phillips
- Children: 3

Allan Robert Phillips (October 25, 1914 – January 26, 1996) was an American ornithologist. He mainly studied birds in the southwestern United States and Mexico. His most notable work is The Birds of Arizona, co-authored with Joe Marshall and Gale Monson.

== Work ==
Phillips, over the span of his almost 65-year career, published a total of 172 articles and other various written material. Except for one on a mammal, all of his works were on birds. Most of these articles were on the distribution, status, and taxonomy of the birds he studied.
