= AviList =

Avian checklist

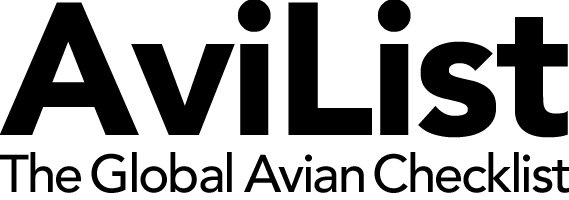
- Formation: 11 June 2025; 16 months ago
- Website: http://www.avilist.org/
- Formerly called: Working Group Avian Checklists (WGAC)

AviList is a global avian checklist created to produce a consensus taxonomy for the birds of the world. It is available online and can be freely downloaded.

Prior to the introduction of AviList in June 2025 there were three widely used and regularly updated global checklists. These separate lists were maintained on behalf of the International Ornithologists' Union, BirdLife International and the Cornell Lab of Ornithology. The lists differed in the number of species recognised and the division of the species into genera and families. At a meeting held in 2018, a group of ornithologists agreed to work together to produce a single consensus taxonomy for the birds of the world. The three former lists have now ceased to make any independent taxonomic updates.

== Background ==
In a discussion at the International Ornithologist's Congress held in Vancouver in 2018, a group of ornithologists agreed to form a committee, the Working Group on Avian Nomenclature (WGAC), to consider consolidating the three independent avian checklists.

The three checklists that have now adopted the AviList taxonomy are:

1. IOC World Bird List maintained by Frank Gill, Pamela C. Rasmussen and David Donsker on behalf of what was previously the International Ornithologists' Committee but now renamed as the International Ornithologists' Union. This taxonomy was used by the English Wikipedia, the British Ornithologists' Union, and the audio recordings website xeno-canto.
2. Birdlife's Taxonomic Checklist originally followed the HBW and BirdLife International Illustrated Checklist of the Birds of the World that was published as two volumes in 2014 and 2016. The taxonomy has been updated regularly by BirdLife International. This taxonomy underpins the IUCN Red List of Threatened Species and a number of international conventions, such as the Agreement on the Conservation of African-Eurasian Migratory Waterbirds (AEWA) and the Convention on Migratory Species (CMS).
3. Clements Checklist of Birds of the World maintained with annual updates by members of the Cornell Lab of Ornithology. This checklist was originally based on a book by James Clements that was published in 2007. The Clements taxonomy underpins the Birds of the World website, the Merlin Bird ID app for iOS and Android devices, the eBird online database of bird observations and the Macaulay Library of photographs, videos and audio recordings.

In addition to the above lists, the Howard and Moore Complete Checklist of the Birds of the World has been influential in bird taxonomy. The fourth edition was published as two volumes in 2013 and 2014 but has not been updated since.

== English names ==
Although the three organizations have agreed to adopt the same taxonomy, there is no agreement to adopt identical English names. With a few exceptions, AviList has adopted the English names previously used by the IOC World Bird List which were based on the rules and principles proposed by Frank Gill and Minturn Wright in their 2006 book Birds of the World: Recommended English Names. The AviList spreadsheet also lists the English names used by Clements and by Birdlife.

The first version of the unified checklist was published online on 11 June 2025. The aim is to issue annual updates. In addition to the three organizations mentioned above, the unified list has been adopted by the British Ornithologists' Union.
