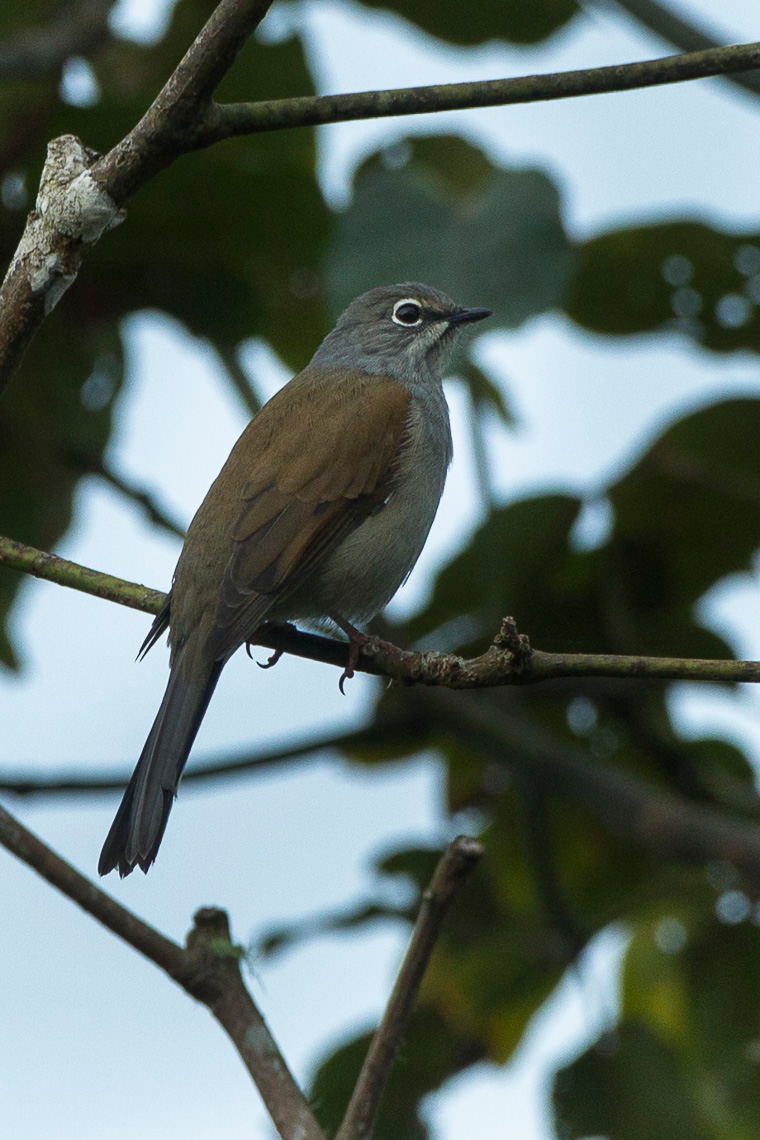
- Brown-backed solitaire

Scientific classification
- Kingdom: Animalia
- Phylum: Chordata
- Class: Aves
- Order: Passeriformes
- Superfamily: Muscicapoidea
- Family: Turdidae

Genera
- Cichlopsis; Entomodestes; Myadestes

= Solitaire (bird) =

Solitaires

Family of birds

The solitaires are medium-sized mostly insectivorous birds in the genera Myadestes, Cichlopsis and Entomodestes of the thrush family Turdidae.

== Taxonomy ==
Although all three genera of solitaires are morphologically similar, genetic studies have indicated that they are not particularly closely related. The genus Myadestes is in the basal clade of the family Turdidae, along with the genera Sialia (the bluebirds) and Neocossyphus (African ant-thrushes).

== Species list ==
Thrushes in three genera are called "solitaires":

- Genus Myadestes 12 species, including 1 now extinct, found in Hawaii, the Americas and the Caribbean
  - ʻŌmaʻo, Myadestes obscurus
  - †kāmaʻo, Myadestes myadestinus
  - Olomaʻo, Myadestes lanaiensis
  - Puaiohi, Myadestes palmeri
  - Townsend's solitaire, Myadestes townsendi
  - Brown-backed solitaire, Myadestes occidentalis
  - Cuban solitaire, Myadestes elisabeth
  - Rufous-throated solitaire, Myadestes genibarbis
  - Black-faced solitaire, Myadestes melanops
  - Varied solitaire, Myadestes coloratus
  - Andean solitaire, Myadestes ralloides
  - Slate-colored solitaire, Myadestes unicolor
- Genus Cichlopsis: 1 species, found to South America
  - Rufous-brown solitaire, Cichlopsis leucogenys
- Genus Entomodestes: 2 species, found in South America
  - White-eared solitaire, Entomodestes leucotis
  - Black solitaire, Entomodestes coracinus
