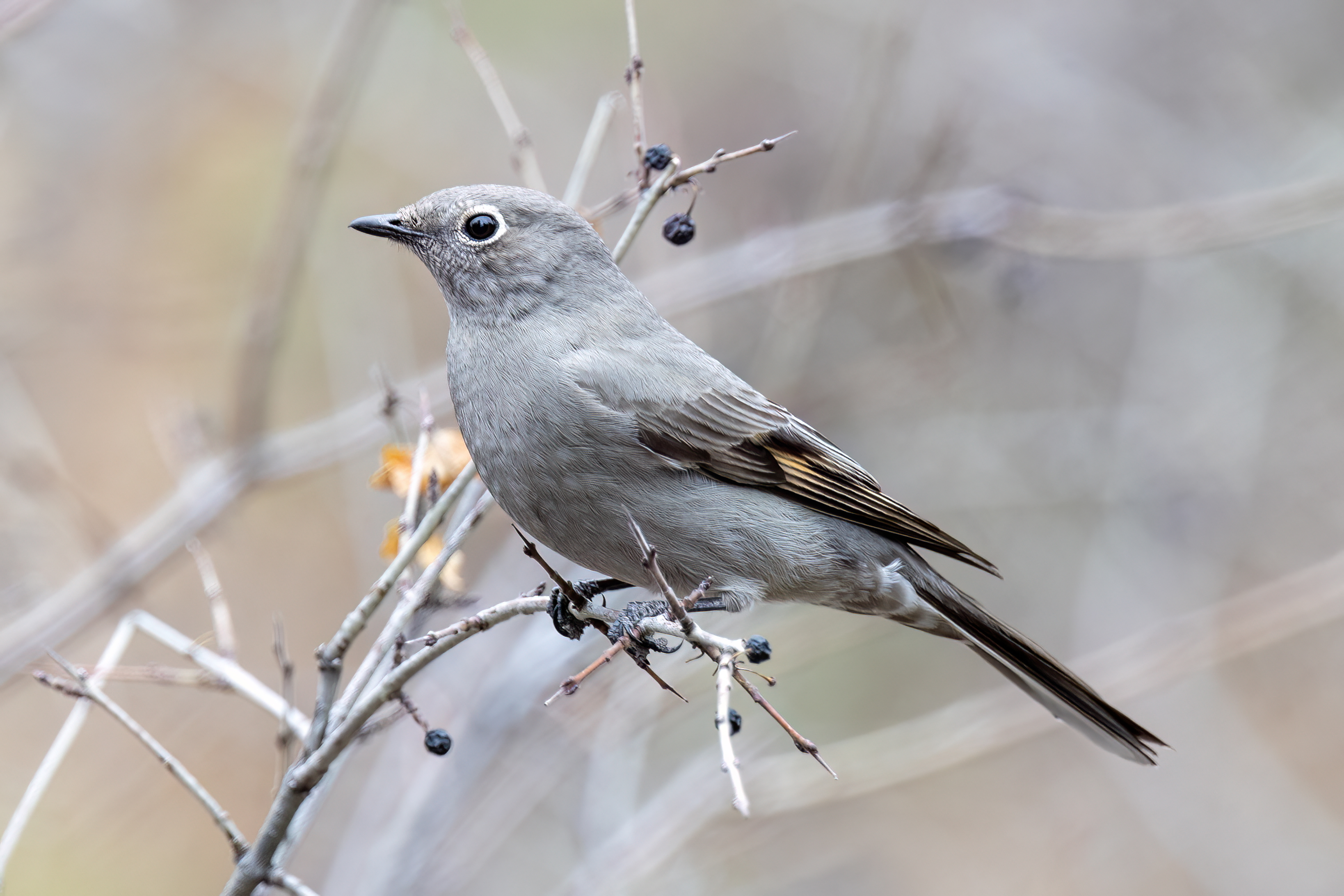

Conservation status
- Least Concern (IUCN 3.1)

Scientific classification
- Kingdom: Animalia
- Phylum: Chordata
- Class: Aves
- Order: Passeriformes
- Family: Turdidae
- Genus: Myadestes
- Species: M. townsendi

Binomial name
- Myadestes townsendi (Audubon, 1838)

= Townsend's solitaire =

Species of bird

Townsend's solitaire (Myadestes townsendi) is a medium-sized thrush, the only solitaire native to America north of Mexico.

== Range and habitat ==
This solitaire ranges from southern Alaska, British Columbia and Alberta to northern Zacatecas in Mexico, preferring montane woodlands. During winter, it may move in search of food to lower elevations, including the Great Plains, northern interior Mexico, and even desert oases.

== Description ==
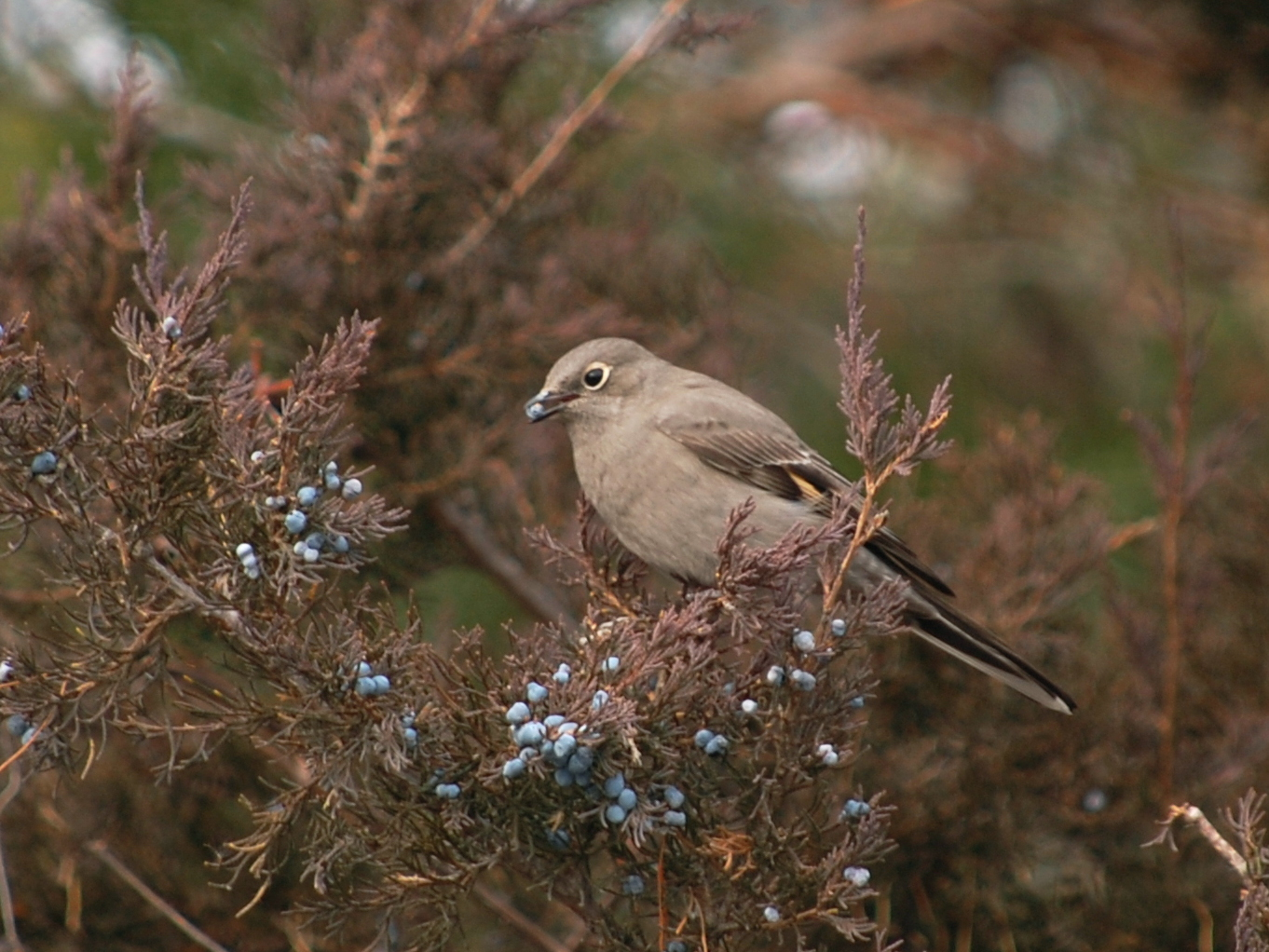
Townsend's solitaire feeding on juniper berries

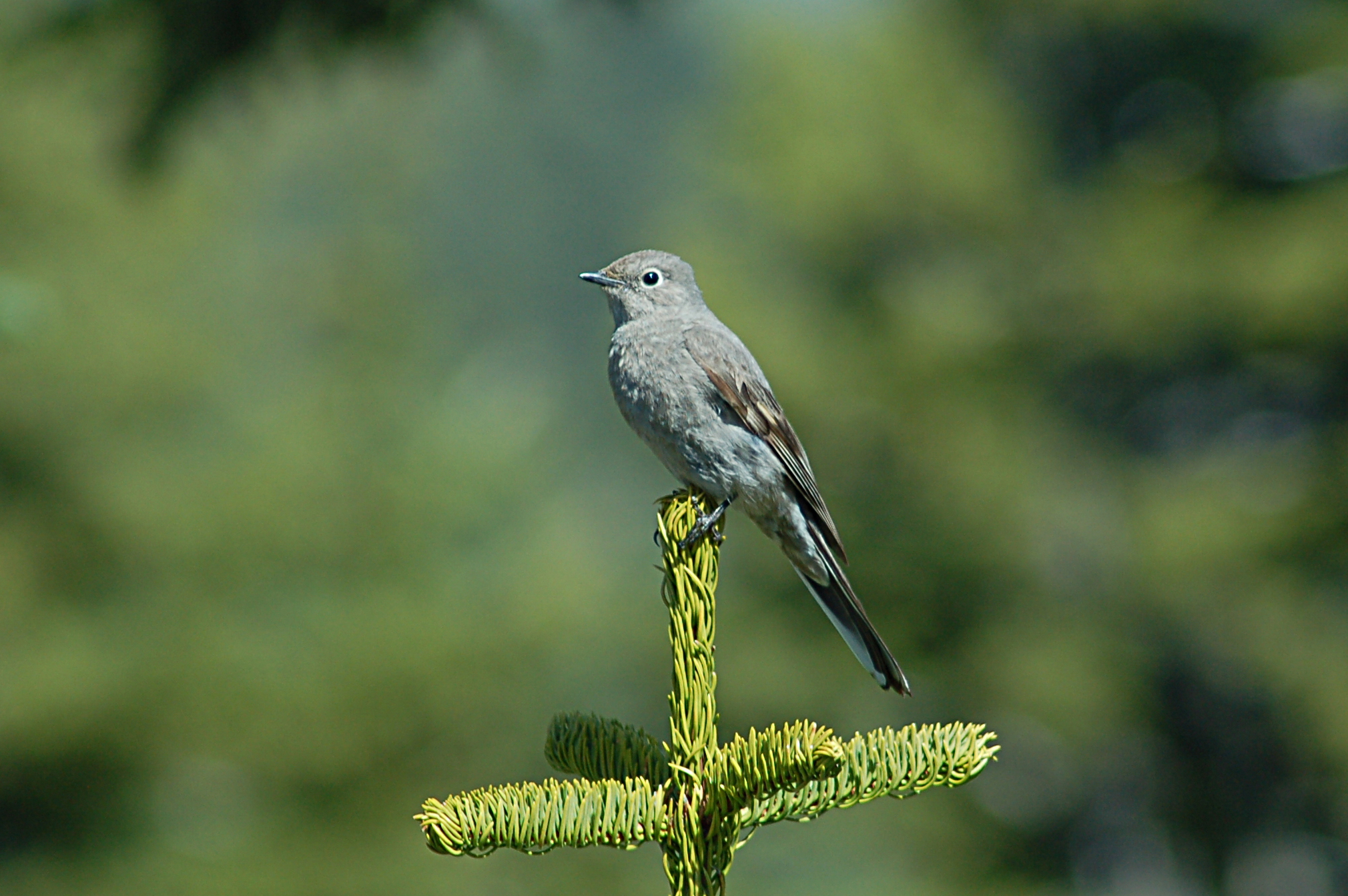
Myadestes townsendi, Ashland, Oregon, June 2014

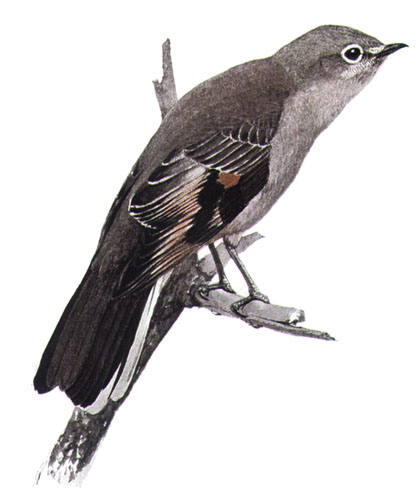
Townsend's solitaire by Louis Agassiz Fuertes

Townsend's solitaire reaches a length of approximately 8–9.5 inches (20–24 centimetres) and wingspan of 14.5 inches (37 cm); it weighs approximately 1.2 oz (34 g). It has a short, thick, blackish bill; a white eye ring; and gray plumage with a buffy wing stripe and edges of the flight feathers. The tail is long, tapered when shut, and edged with white. Juveniles are mottled gray and white.

It perches in a rather upright position, often high on a branch and often staying still for a long time.

Though it has some similarities to the northern mockingbird, particularly as to the tail, its dark underparts, shape, size, and behavior are not similar.

It feeds primarily on berries and insects. The solitaire is amongst the most specialized of all North American birds since its diet in winter consists almost entirely of the fleshy cones of the juniper bush, and the solitary birds form territories around productive juniper patches which they strongly defend

=== Voice ===
Its song consists of loud, melodious flute-like rising and falling phrases with "low, husky notes interspersed but no distinct pattern" and "a slightly mechanical quality." The call is a squeaky eeek or "clear, soft whistle heeh".

== Nesting ==
They nest on the ground in hollows under banks or crevices about roots of trees or fallen stumps, making a large, loosely constructed pile of weeds and trash, hollowed and lined with rootlets. The nest resembles that of other solitaires: a cup of fine plant material on or close to the ground. Townsend's solitaire usually lays three or four eggs that are grayish-white with brown dots or splotches concentrated at the larger end.

== Etymology ==
The name of this bird commemorates the ornithologist John Kirk Townsend.
