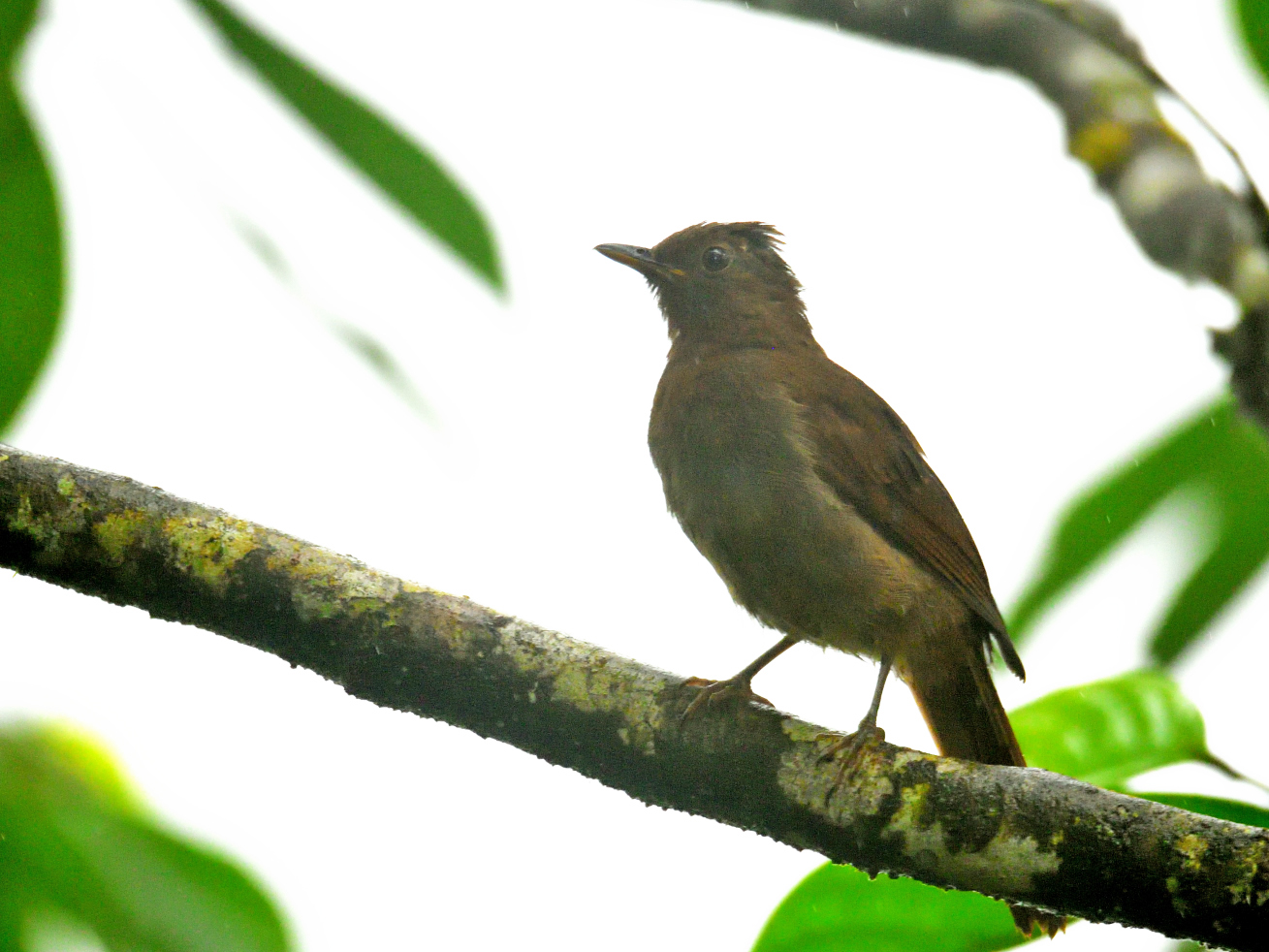
- At Amagusa Reserve, Ecuador

Conservation status
- Vulnerable (IUCN 3.1)

Scientific classification
- Kingdom: Animalia
- Phylum: Chordata
- Class: Aves
- Order: Passeriformes
- Family: Turdidae
- Genus: Cichlopsis; Cabanis, 1851
- Species: C. leucogenys

Binomial name
- Cichlopsis leucogenys Cabanis, 1851

Synonyms
- See text

= Rufous-brown solitaire =

Species of bird

The rufous-brown solitaire (Cichlopsis leucogenys) is a species of bird in the thrush family Turdidae. It is found in Brazil, Colombia, Ecuador, Guyana, Peru, Suriname, and Venezuela.

== Taxonomy and systematics ==
The rufous-brown solitaire was originally described by Jean Cabanis in 1840 with its current binomial Cichlopsis leucogenys. Cabanis erected Cichlopsis for this species, reassigning it from earlier erroneous placements. For a time in the mid-late twentieth century some authors merged Cichlopsis into genus Myadestes but by the end of the century the species was generally recognized in Cichlopsis.

The rufous-brown solitaire's further taxonomy is unresolved. The IOC, the Clements taxonomy, AviList, and the independent South American Classification Committee treat it as the only member of its genus. They assign it these four subspecies:

- C. l. gularis Salvin & Godman, 1882
- C. l. chubbi Chapman, 1924
- C. l. peruviana Hellmayr, 1930
- C. l. leucogenys Cabanis, 1851

BirdLife International's Handbook of the Birds of the World (HBW) has treated each of these as a separate species since 2016. It names them thus:

- C. gularis: Guianan solitaire
- C. chubbi: chestnut-throated solitaire
- C. peruviana: Peruvian solitaire
- C. leucogenys: rufous-brown solitaire

Some current authors suggest that the HBW approach may have merit but that further study is needed. The Clements taxonomy does recognize some distinctions among the subspecies, within the species calling them the "rufous-brown solitaire (Guianan)" and so forth.

This article follows the majority model of one species with four subspecies.

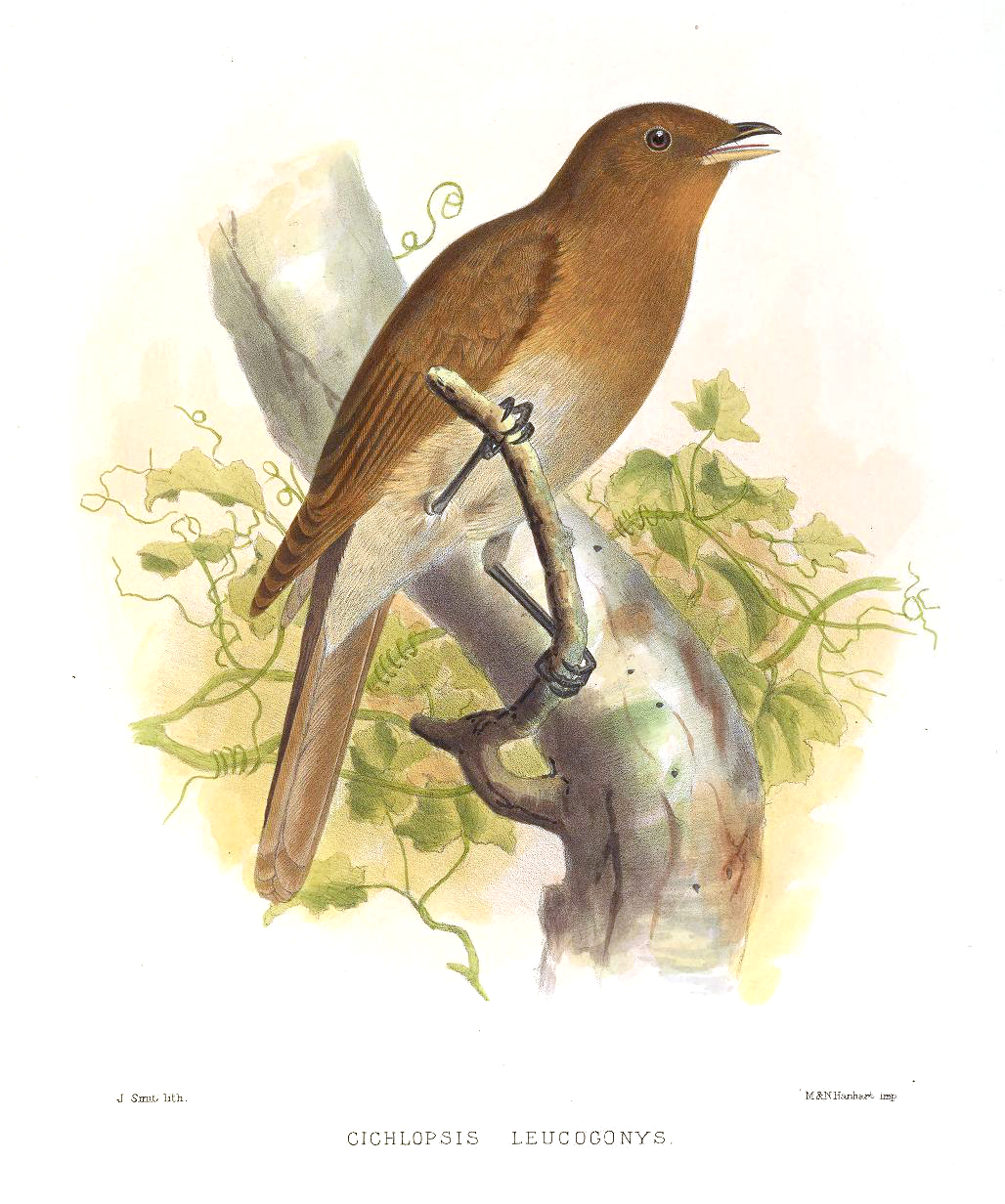
Illustration by Joseph Smit, 1869

== Description ==
The rufous-brown solitaire is 20 to 21 cm (7.9 to 8.3 in) long and weighs about 61 g (2.2 oz). The sexes have the same plumage. Adults of the nominate subspecies C. l. leucogenys have a rufous-brown, dark cinnamon, or brownish rufous head, upperparts, throat, and upper breast. They have a pale whitish to yellow ring of bare skin around the eye. The wings and tail feathers have dusky inner webs and outer webs the same color as the upperparts. Their breast below the rufous bib is dingy whitish with a gray wash and their belly dingy whitish with a tawny wash. Their undertail coverts are bright cinnamon. Juveniles are similar to adults but with indistinct buff spots on the upperparts and breast.

The other subspecies differ from the nominate and each other thus:

- C. l. gularis: buffy ochre throat, pale brown band across the breast, and milky rufous undertail coverts
- C. l. chubbi: darker chestnut throat than nominate with chestnut-tinged belly and rich chestnut undertail coverts
- C. l. peruviana: rufous-tinged ochre throat, blackish lores, pale tawny lower breast, and vague pale rufous supercilium and eye-ring

Adults of all subspecies have a dark reddish brown iris, a stout slightly hooked bill with a blackish maxilla and a bright yellow to orangish yellow mandible, and yellowish to brownish yellow legs and feet.

== Distribution and habitat ==
The rufous-brown solitaire has a highly disjunct distribution. The subspecies are found thus:

- C. l. gularis: tepuis in southeastern Bolívar state in Venezuela, Guyana, western Suriname, and extreme northwestern Brazil
- C. l. chubbi: western slope of Colombia's Western Andes from Valle del Cauca Department south intermittently into far northwestern Ecuador's Esmeraldas and Pichincha provinces
- C. l. peruviana: intermittently on eastern Andean slope in Peru's Huánuco, Pasco, and Junín departments
- C. l. leucogenys: southeastern Brazil's states of Bahia, Minas Gerais, and Espírito Santo with scattered records north and south of that range

The rufous-brown solitaire inhabits humid to wet montane forest and mature secondary forest, especially areas heavy with moss. In elevation it ranges between 900 and 1,450 m (3,000 and 4,800 ft) in Venezuela, below 1,000 m (3,300 ft) in Colombia, between 400 and 1,200 m (1,300 and 3,900 ft) in Ecuador, between 900 and 1,100 m (3,000 and 3,600 ft) in Peru, and from sea level to 800 m (2,600 ft) in eastern Brazil.

== Behavior ==
=== Movement ===
The movements of the rufous-brown solitaire have not been studied, but evidence points to local seasonal and elevational movements in some areas.

=== Feeding ===
The rufous-brown solitaire feeds primarily on fruit and is believed to include invertebrates in its diet as well. Fruits of fig (Ficus) and Melastomataceae are known dietary components. It usually forages singly or in pairs but occasionally joins mixed-species feeding flocks in fruiting trees. It plucks fruit while perched and with brief sallies from a perch.

=== Breeding ===
The rufous-brown solitaire's breeding seasons have not been defined but appear to vary among the subspecies. C. l. gularis' season spans at least February to April. C. l. chubbi apparently breeds in June and July and the nominate's season includes September. The only described nest was an open cup made from moss and thin rootlets in a tree fork. Nothing else is known about the species' breeding biology.

=== Vocalization ===
The rufous-brown solitaire's song is complex and musical, composed of rapid, variable phrases. It varies somewhat between populations. In Venezuela it is described as "short, varied, and complex, often loud but more squeaky and chattery than musical; a few melodic and squeaky notes mixed with chips, short buzzes, and trills in rapid sequence". Its call there is "a high, vanishingly thin eeeeee". In Ecuador it is described as "a series of complex, variable, and rapidly uttered phrases" that are "mainly quite musical though some chattering or even twittering notes can be interspersed". In eastern Brazil it is "rapid sequences of inhaled fff, single tjuw and tjeeh notes, extr. high see, and trills and rattles".

== Status ==
The IUCN follows HBW taxonomy and so has separately assessed the four subspecies of the rufous-brown solitaire. The nominate rufous-brown solitaire was originally assessed as Endangered but since 2025 is considered Vulnerable. It has a small and fragmented range and its estimated population of 3000 to 12,000 mature individuals is believed to be decreasing. "Habitat loss within this species' range is principally driven by agricultural expansion...it is thought plausible that the species will become entirely restricted to conservation units within the range and may be further at risk if proposals to reduce the area of such come to fruition." The "Guianan solitaire" (C. l. gularis) is assessed as Near Threatened. It has a limited range and its estimated population of between 750 and 1875 mature individuals is believed to be stable. "The species is currently not thought to be under threat. Deforestation or human population expansion are virtually absent from the Tepuis and Wilhelmina mountains, and the species and its range are considered safe." The "chestnut-throated solitaire" (C. l. chubbi) is assessed as Near Threatened. It has a small and disjunct range; its estimated population of between 2500 and 10,000 mature individuals is believed to be decreasing. "This species is threatened by deforestation throughout its range with expanding human populations and subsequent loss of forests to settlements, agriculture, pastures and logging." The "Peruvian solitaire" (C. l. peruviana) is also assessed as Near Threatened. It has a small range; its population size is not known but is believed to be stable. "The species is threatened by forest loss for conversion into livestock pastures and into agricultural fields throughout its range." In Venezuela it is "rare to uncommon but occasionally quite common for short periods of time". It is "local and uncommon" in Colombia and "scarce and very local" in Ecuador. It is known from only a few sites in Peru and is "uncommon to rare" in eastern Brazil. It occurs in at least two protected areas in each of Colombia and Brazil.
