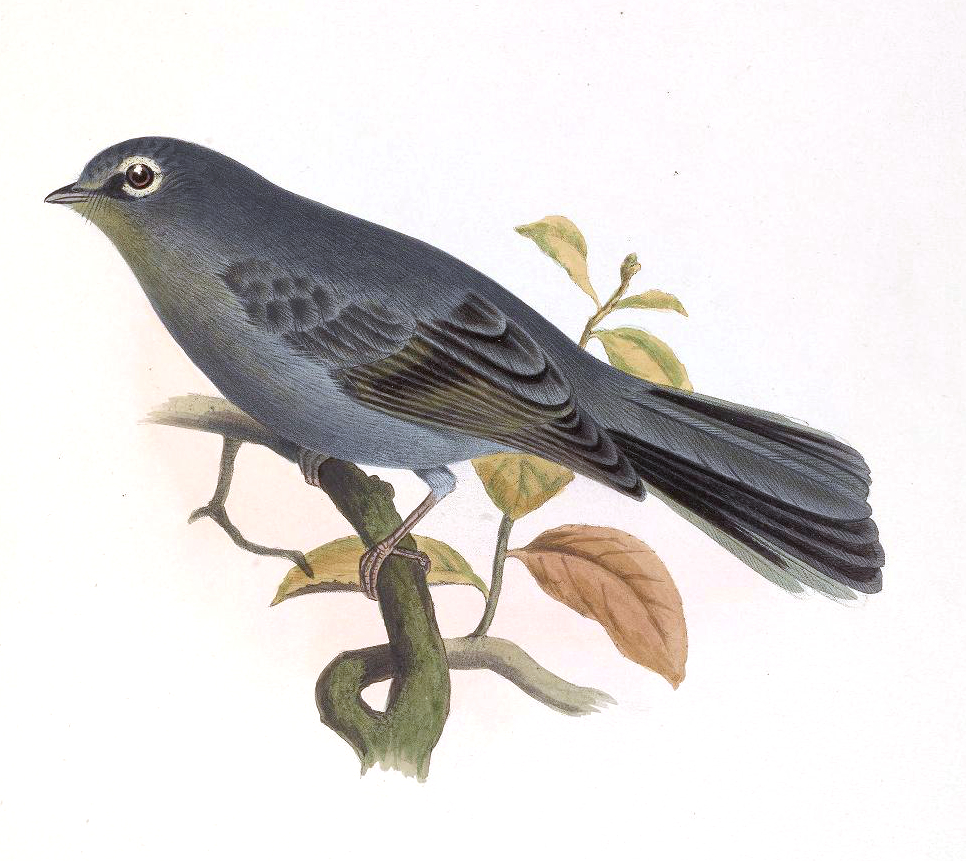

Conservation status
- Least Concern (IUCN 3.1)

Scientific classification
- Kingdom: Animalia
- Phylum: Chordata
- Class: Aves
- Order: Passeriformes
- Family: Turdidae
- Genus: Myadestes
- Species: M. unicolor

Binomial name
- Myadestes unicolor PL Sclater, 1857

= Slate-colored solitaire =

Species of bird

The slate-colored solitaire (Myadestes unicolor) is a species of bird in the family Turdidae, the thrushes. It is found in Belize, El Salvador, Guatemala, Honduras, Mexico, and Nicaragua.

== Taxonomy and systematics ==
The slate-colored solitaire was originally described in 1857 as Myadestes unicolor and has retained that binomial since then. The slate-colored solitaire and the brown-backed solitaire (M. occidentalis) are sister species.

The slate-colored solitaire's further taxonomy is not settled. The IOC, AviList, and BirdLife International's Handbook of the Birds of the World treat it as monospecific. However, the Clements taxonomy assigns it two subspecies, the nominate M. u. unicolor (PL Sclater, 1857) and M. u. pallens (Miller & Griscom, 1925).

This article treats the slate-colored solitaire as monotypic.

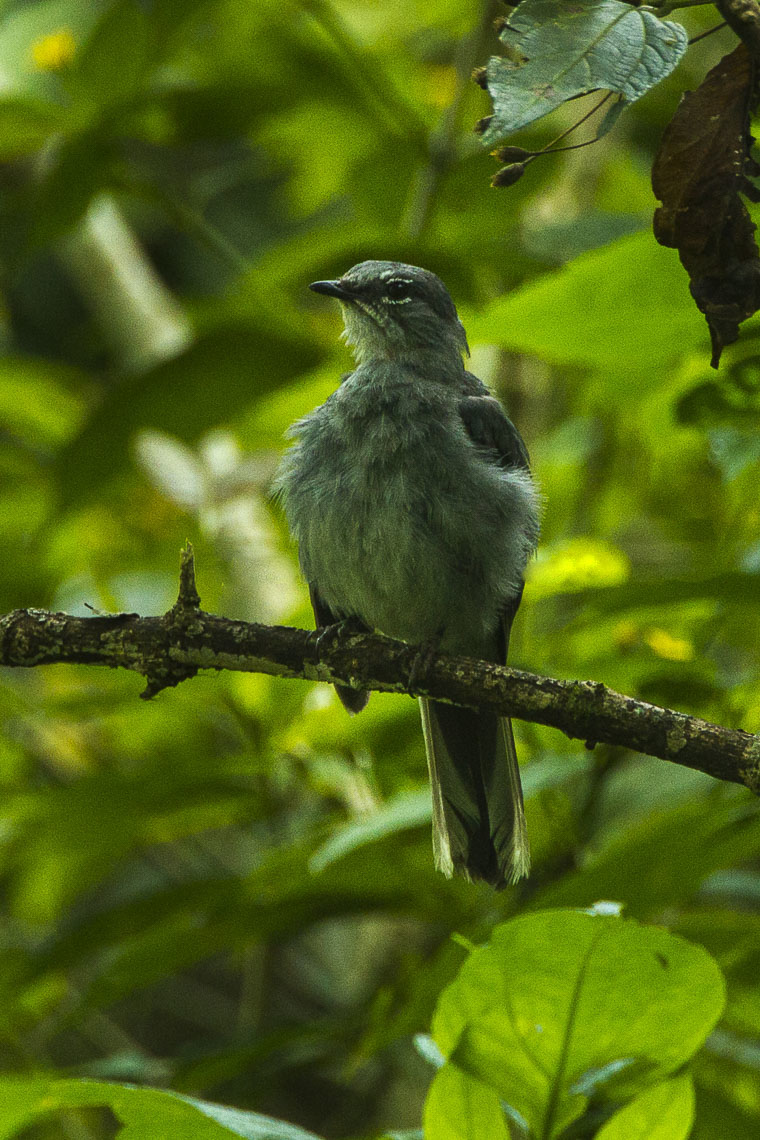
Slate-colored solitaire, Mexico

== Description ==
The brown-backed solitaire is 19 to 20.5 cm (7.5 to 8.1 in) long and weighs 30 to 44 g (1.1 to 1.6 oz). The sexes have the same plumage. Adults are mostly slaty gray that is slightly lighter on their underparts than above. They have a broken white eye-ring, blacker primary coverts, black flight feathers with buff edges, and whitish gray outer tail feathers. They have a dark bill and yellowish legs and feet. Juveniles have a buffish "moustache". Their upperparts have black-edged buff spots and their underparts have whitish buff centers on the feathers that give a scaly appearance.

== Distribution and habitat ==
The brown-backed solitaire has a disjunct distribution in several mountainous areas. One population is found in Mexico from southern San Luis Potosi to central Oaxaca and another in Veracruz. A third is found from Chiapas south into central Guatemala. A fourth is in Belize and the last is from southern Guatemala south across extreme northern El Salvador and much of Honduras into north-central Nicaragua. The species inhabits cloudforest and pine-oak and montane evergreen forests in the tropical and subtropical zones. Sources differ on its elevational limits. Two sources state them as 800 to 2,500 m (2,600 to 8,200 ft) and 900 to 1,500 m (3,000 to 4,900 ft). Two others place the species from near sea level to 2,700 m (8,900 ft).

== Behavior ==
=== Movement ===
The slate-colored solitaire is mostly a year-round resident of the highlands but in some areas individuals move downslope after the breeding season.

=== Feeding ===
The slate-colored solitaire feeds on fruit and forages at all levels in the forest. Further details of its diet and foraging behavior are not known.

=== Breeding ===
The slate-colored solitaire's breeding season has not been defined but includes April in Oaxaca. It makes a nest of moss, placed on the ground typically on the slope of a ravine. The clutch is two to three eggs that are whitish with reddish brown markings. The incubation period, time to fledging, and details of parental care are not known.

=== Vocalization ===
The slate-colored solitaire's "loud, distinctive voice" is a "ringing metallic phrase, repeated regularly with little variation". It is described in much more detail as ethereal and haunting that "often starts hesitantly with a few poor notes, then breaks into [a] varied series of clear or quavering fluty whistles, carefully delivered but of great beauty, often including or ending with loose trill, e.g. weedu teee wheeoee du du whit whit whit… du-whip! Drrrreee teedle-o chup chup chup…". Its calls include a "hard nasal rrank or rran" and a "buzzier zzrink".

== Role in culture ==
In Mexico the slate-colored solitaire plays a significant role in some Catholic rituals.

== Status ==
The IUCN has assessed the slate-colored solitaire as being of Least Concern. It has a large range; its population size is not known and is believed to be decreasing. No immediate threats have been identified. It is considered fairly common to common overall and fairly common south of Mexico. Populations in [eastern] Mexico have been reduced, and possibly extirpated, owing to capture for the cagebird trade.
