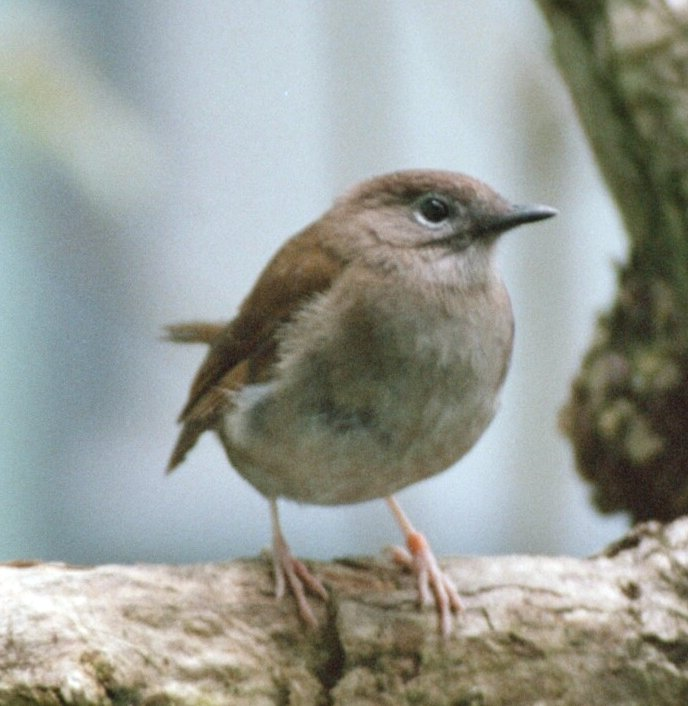
- Puaiohi (M. palmeri)

Scientific classification
- Kingdom: Animalia
- Phylum: Chordata
- Class: Aves
- Order: Passeriformes
- Family: Turdidae
- Subfamily: Myadestinae
- Genus: Myadestes; Swainson, 1838

Type species
- Myadestes genibarbis Swainson, 1838

Species
- See text

= Myadestes =

Genus of birds

Myadestes is a genus of solitaires, medium-sized mostly insectivorous birds in the thrush family, Turdidae.

They are found in the Americas and Hawaiʻi, where several island species have become extinct.

== Taxonomy ==
The genus Myadestes was introduced in 1838 by the English naturalist William Swainson to accommodate a single species, the rufous-throated solitaire, which is therefore the type species of the genus. The genus name combines the Ancient Greek mua meaning "fly" and edestēs meaning "eater".

The genus contains the following 13 species:

Genus Myadestes – Swainson, 1838 – thirteen species
Common name	Scientific name and subspecies	Range	Size and ecology	IUCN status and estimated population
Brown-backed solitaire	Myadestes occidentalis Stejneger, 1882	northwest Mexico to Honduras	Size: Habitat: Diet:	LC
Slate-colored solitaire	Myadestes unicolor Sclater, PL, 1857	south Mexico to Nicaragua	Size: Habitat: Diet:	LC
Townsend's solitaire	Myadestes townsendi (Audubon, 1838)	west Canada to central Mexico	Size: Habitat: Diet:	LC
†Kāmaʻo or large Kauaʻi thrush	Myadestes myadestinus (Stejneger, 1887)	Kauai (Hawaiian Islands, extinct)	Size: Habitat: Diet:	EX
†ʻĀmaui or Oahu thrush	Myadestes woahensis (Bloxam, A, 1899)	Oahu (Hawaiian Islands, extinct)	Size: Habitat: Diet:	EX
Puaiohi or small Kauaʻi thrush	Myadestes palmeri (Rothschild, 1893)	Kauai (Hawaiian Islands)	Size: Habitat: Diet:	CR
Olomaʻo	Myadestes lanaiensis (Wilson, SB, 1891)	Hawaiian Islands	Size: Habitat: Diet:	CR
ʻŌmaʻo	Myadestes obscurus (Gmelin, JF, 1789)	Hawaii (Hawaiian Islands)	Size: Habitat: Diet:	NT
Cuban solitaire	Myadestes elisabeth (Lembeye, 1850)	Cuba	Size: Habitat: Diet:	LC
Rufous-throated solitaire	Myadestes genibarbis Swainson, 1838	West Indies	Size: Habitat: Diet:	LC
Black-faced solitaire	Myadestes melanops Salvin, 1865	Costa Rica and Panama	Size: Habitat: Diet:	LC
Varied solitaire	Myadestes coloratus Nelson, 1912	Panama	Size: Habitat: Diet:	NT
Andean solitaire	Myadestes ralloides (d'Orbigny, 1840)	north Venezuela to west Bolivia	Size: Habitat: Diet:	LC
