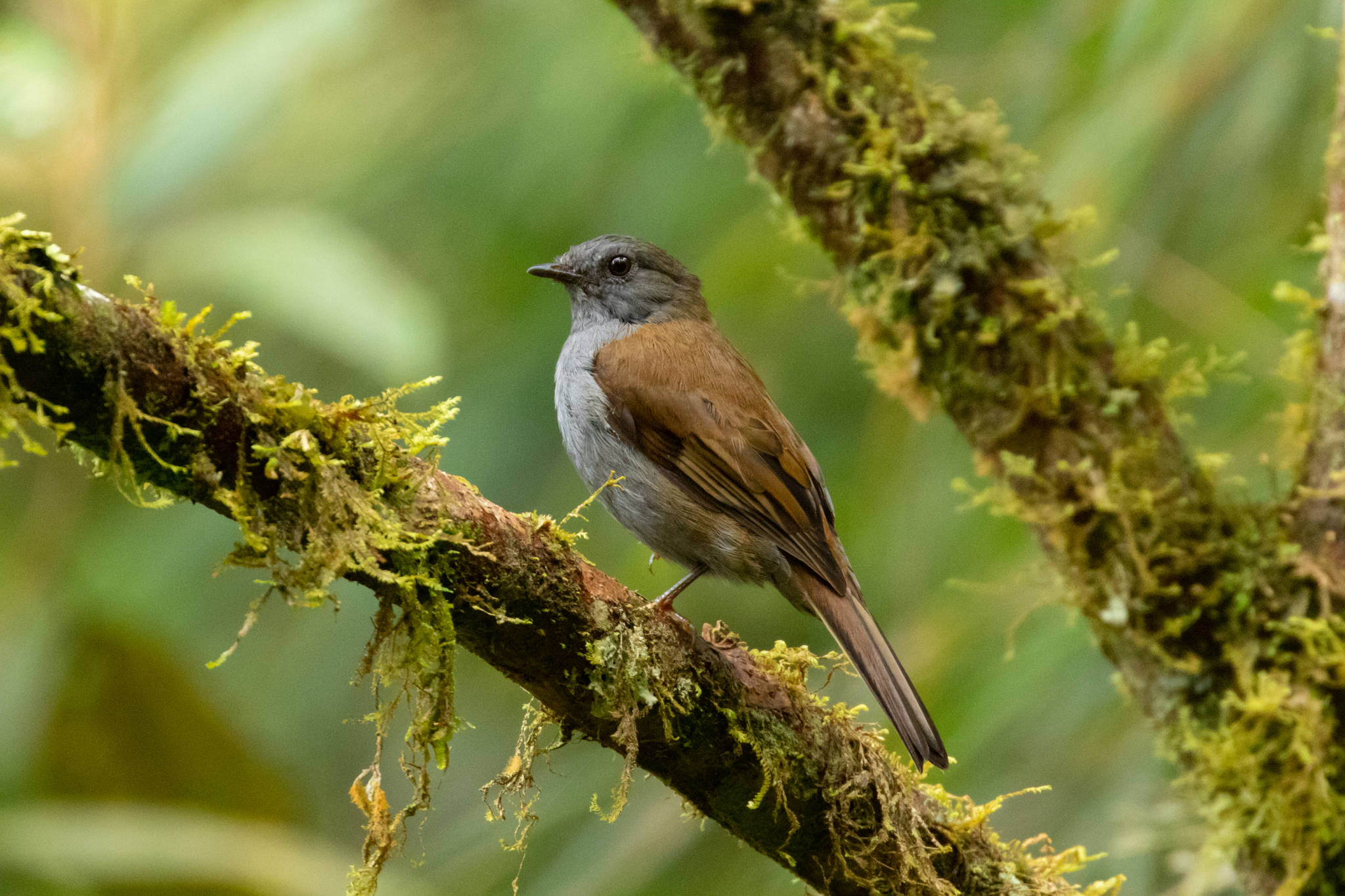

Conservation status
- Least Concern (IUCN 3.1)

Scientific classification
- Kingdom: Animalia
- Phylum: Chordata
- Class: Aves
- Order: Passeriformes
- Family: Turdidae
- Genus: Myadestes
- Species: M. ralloides

Binomial name
- Myadestes ralloides (D'Orbigny, 1840)

= Andean solitaire =

Species of bird

The Andean solitaire (Myadestes ralloides) is a species of bird in the family Turdidae, the thrushes. It is found in Bolivia, Colombia, Ecuador, Peru, and Venezuela.

== Taxonomy and systematics ==
The Andean solitaire was originally described in 1840 as Muscipeta ralloides. It was later reassigned to its present genus Myadestes that had been erected in 1838. During the middle of the twentieth century several authors treated what are now the Andean solitaire, the black-faced solitaire (M. malanops), and varied solitaire (M. coloratus) as conspecific. They are not well differentiated and form a superspecies.

The Andean solitaire has these four subspecies:

- M. r. plumbeiceps Hellmayr, 1921
- M. r. candelae Meyer de Schauensee, 1947
- M. r. venezuelensis Sclater, PL, 1856
- M. r. ralloides (D'Orbigny, 1840)

A genetic study published in 2007 determined that some of the subspecies may deserve full species status. Based on that study and vocal differences, the Clements taxonomy recognizes three groups within the species: M. r. plumbeiceps and M. r. ralloides as single-species "groups" and M. r. candelae plus M. r. venezuelensis as the third group.

== Description ==
The Andean solitaire is 17 to 18 cm (6.7 to 7.1 in) long and weighs 25.5 to 37 g (0.90 to 1.3 oz). The sexes have the same plumage. Adults of the nominate subspecies M. r. ralloides have a dull grayish olive crown and black lores on an otherwise dull medium gray face. Their back, rump, and uppertail coverts are reddish brown. Their wings are reddish brown with dark tips on the primary coverts and dark bases on the secondaries. Their tail is reddish brown with white inner webs on the outer feathers. Their underparts are dull medium gray. They have a dusky bill and pale brown legs. Juveniles are similar to adults but with pale buff spots on the upperparts and dark stippling on the underparts.

Subspecies M. r. plumbeiceps has richer brown upperparts than the nominate with a gray crown and a dark yellow base to the mandible. M. r. candelae has a dark tawny crown and upperparts and a darker gray breast than the nominate. M. r. venezuelensis is a brighter tawnier brown above than the nominate, with a gray forehead, a brown crown, more olive flanks, and yellowish legs.

== Distribution and habitat ==
The Andean solitaire has a disjunct distribution throughout the Andes. The subspecies are found thus:

- M. r. plumbeiceps: Colombia's Western and Central Andes and south through most of western Ecuador
- M. r. candelae: the Magdalena River valley in north-central Colombia
- M. r. venezuelensis: the Serranía del Perijá on the Colombia-Venezuela border; the Venezuelan Coastal Range from Carabobo to northern Miranda; Andes from Táchira south through eastern Colombia and eastern Ecuador into Peru as far as the Marañón River
- M. r. ralloides: eastern slope from the Marañón in Peru south to Chuquisaca Department in central Bolivia

The Andean solitaire inhabits humid forest in the foothills and mountains and also mature secondary forest. It appears to favor ravines and mountain streams. In elevation it ranges mostly between 900 and 2,800 m (3,000 and 9,200 ft) but accidentally as high as 4,500 m (14,800 ft) in Venezuela, between 350 and 2,800 m (1,100 and 9,200 ft) in Colombia, mostly between 1,000 and 2,500 m (3,300 and 8,200 ft) in eastern Ecuador and lower in the west, and mostly between 1,200 and 2,900 m (3,900 and 9,500 ft) and locally down to 600 m (2,000 ft) in Peru.

== Behavior ==
=== Movement ===
The Andean solitaire is primarily a year-round resident though some wandering has been documented.

=== Feeding ===
The Andean solitaire feeds on insects and fruit. It forages mostly in the forest's lower to mid-levels. It plucks fruit while perched or with aerial sallies from a perch; insects are plucked from vegetation with a sally and taken in mid-air. Though it does not follow mixed-species feeding flocks it does share fruiting trees with other species. It attends army ant swarms but stays in the undergrowth rather than on the ground when doing so.

=== Breeding ===
The Andean solitaire's breeding season has not been fully defined but appears to span from February to June and perhaps to August. It builds a cup nest of moss lined with rootlets on a log or an earthen bank. The clutch is two eggs that are white or creamy white with reddish brown speckles. The incubation period, time to fledging, and details of parental care are not known.

=== Vocalization ===
The Andean solitaire sings from a hidden perch high in a tree, and mostly at dawn and dusk. The songs differ among the subspecies. On the Andes' western slope it is a "leisurely, loud, lilting series of well-spaced phrases consisting of pure, flute-like liquid notes, sometimes interspersed with more guttural, gurgling ones, tliii… liidl-ii… turdelii… triilii… lur-lur… iii-uuu…". In Venezuela it sings "clear halting phrases, of pipelike purity, often separated by extended pauses, lee-day...lur-lur...see-see...eee-ooo, ee-oh-lay...lur-lur-lur, and so on". That song has been likened to that of a red-eyed vireo (Vireo olivaceus) though somewhat thinner and more ringing. The southernmost subspecies M. r. ralloides sings "a rusty, squeaky series of thin whistled phrases, often descending". Its calls include a "throaty, wheezy downslurred whistling clang" and when alarmed or stressed, a "rraou".

== Status ==
The IUCN has assessed the Andean solitaire as being of Least Concern. It has a very large range; its population size is not known and is believed to be decreasing. No immediate threats have been identified. It is considered common in Venezuela, fairly common in Colombia, "widespread and often common" in Ecuador, and fairly common in Peru.
