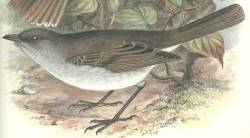

Conservation status
- Critically endangered, possibly extinct (IUCN 3.1)

Scientific classification
- Kingdom: Animalia
- Phylum: Chordata
- Class: Aves
- Order: Passeriformes
- Family: Turdidae
- Genus: Myadestes
- Species: M. lanaiensis

Binomial name
- Myadestes lanaiensis (Wilson, SB, 1891)
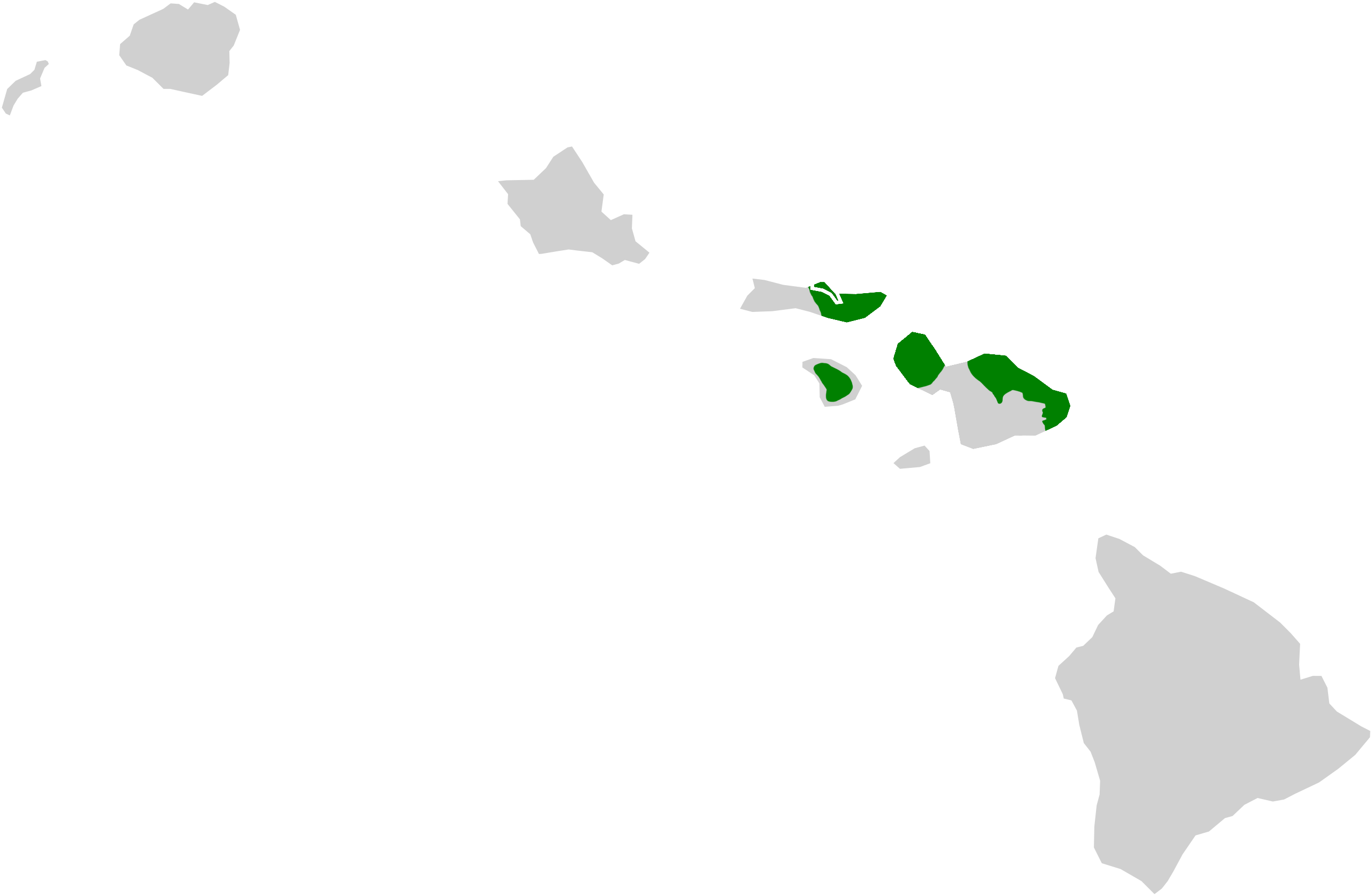

= Olomaʻo =

Species of bird

The olomaʻo (Myadestes lanaiensis) is a small, dark solitaire endemic to Maui, Lānaʻi and Molokaʻi in the Hawaiian Islands. It is currently listed as Critically Endangered under the IUCN Red List of Threatened Species.

== Description ==
It grows up to 7 inches in length. The male and female of the species look similar. It is dark brown above and gray below with blackish legs.

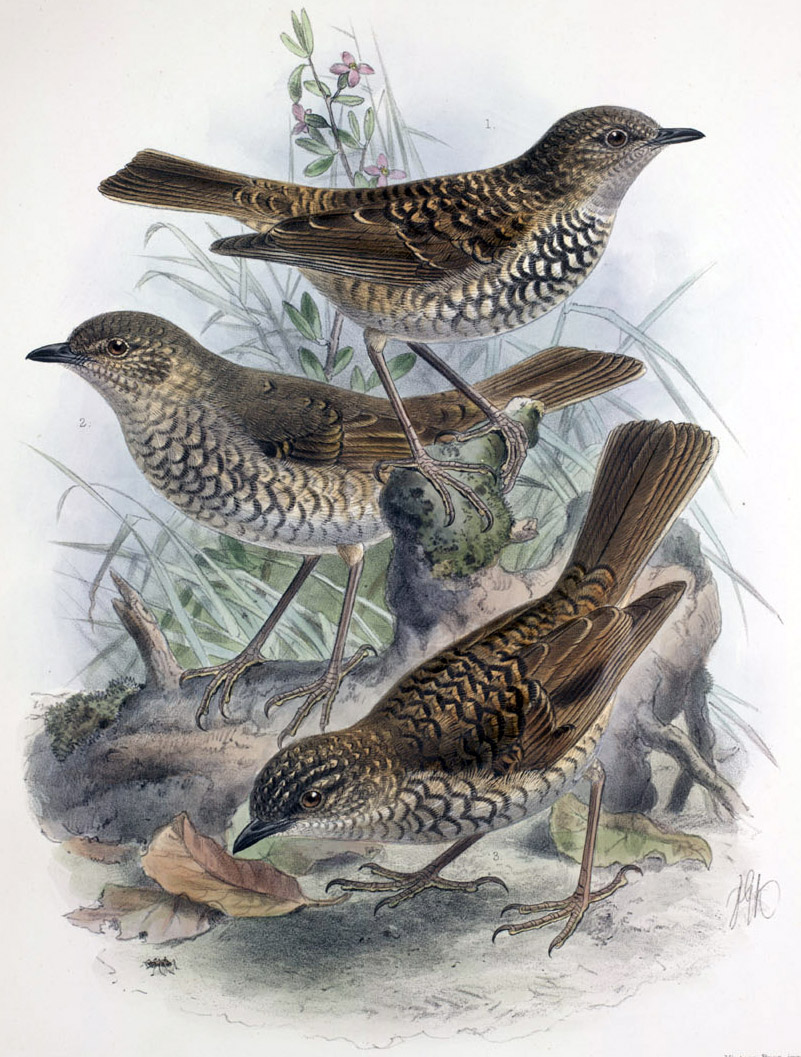
Myadestes myadestinus (top), Myadestes lanaiensis lanaiensis (middle). and Myadestes obscurus (bottom)

== Call ==
Its song consists of a complex melody of flute-like notes, liquid warbles, and gurgling whistles. The call is a catlike rasp, with an alternate high pitched note similar to a police whistle.

== Behavior and diet ==
It occurs in densely vegetated gulches, frequenting the understory where it often perches motionless in a hunched posture. Like other native Hawaiian thrushes, it quivers its wings and feeds primarily on fruit and insects.

== Conservation ==
The olomaʻo is still classified as Critically Endangered due to the possibility that an extremely small population or individuals may still exist. The last definitive sighting occurred on Oahu in the 1850s, on Lānaʻi in 1933, and on Molokaʻi in 1980 in the Kamakou Preserve. In the late 19th century, it was considered common to abundant on Maui, Lānaʻi, and Molokaʻi, but land clearing, including the establishment and subsequent development of Lānaʻi City, and avian malaria brought on by introduced mosquitoes decimated the birds. Introduced animals such as feral pigs (which create pools of water from their wallows that allow mosquitoes to breed) also aided in its demise.

== Taxonomy ==
It is closely related to the other species of Hawaiian thrushes, the puaiohi (M. palmeri), the ʻōmaʻo (M. obscurus), and the extinct kāmaʻo (M. myadestinus). The Maui birds may have been a separate subspecies, but they became extinct before the late 19th century and before any studies could be performed.

Two subspecies are recognized:

- M. l. lanaiensis - Lānaʻi thrush
- M. l. rutha - Molokaʻi thrush

The extinct ʻāmaui that was endemic to Oʻahu has sometimes been considered as a subspecies.
