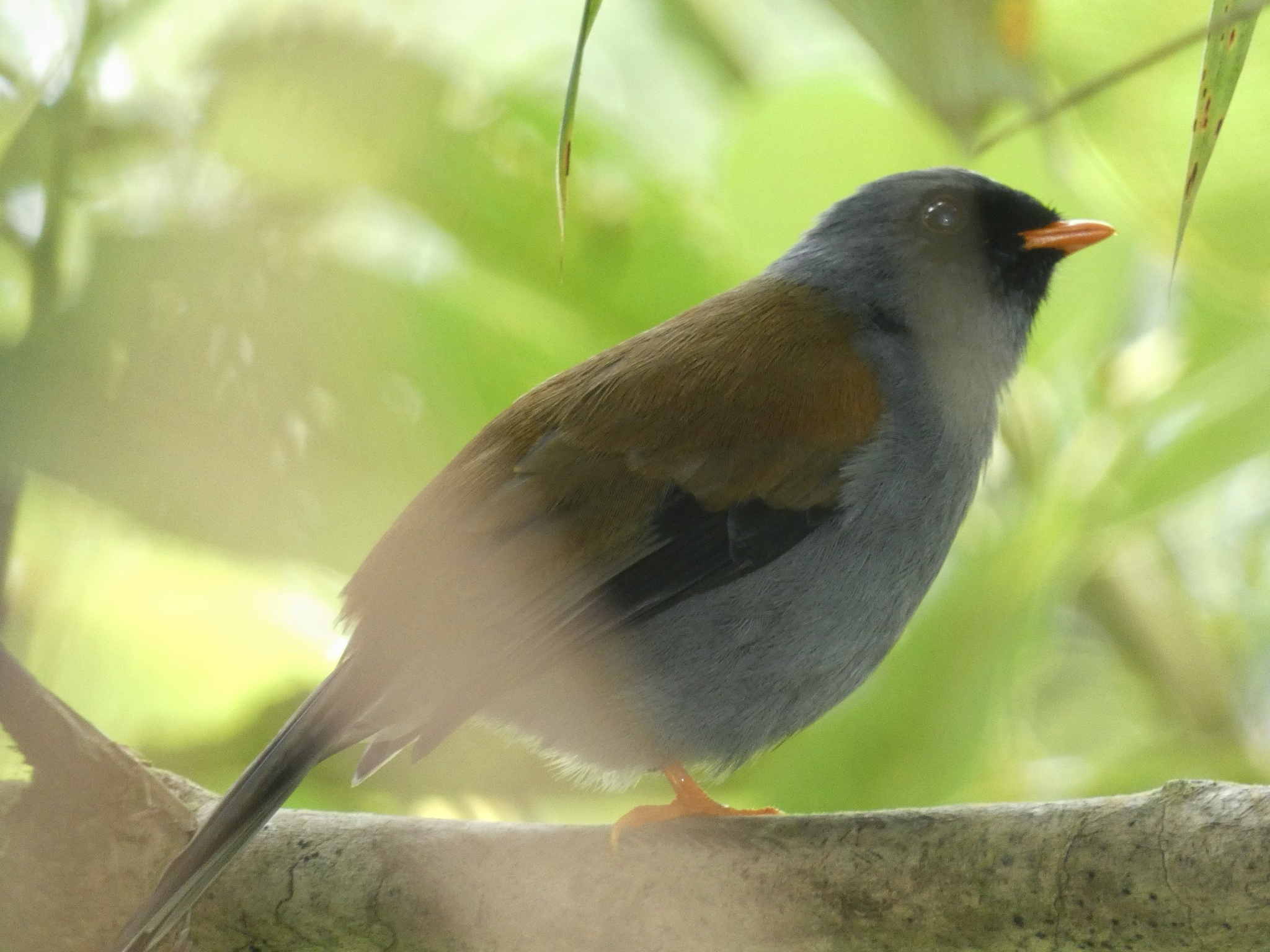

Conservation status
- Near Threatened (IUCN 3.1)

Scientific classification
- Kingdom: Animalia
- Phylum: Chordata
- Class: Aves
- Order: Passeriformes
- Family: Turdidae
- Genus: Myadestes
- Species: M. coloratus

Binomial name
- Myadestes coloratus Nelson, 1912

= Varied solitaire =

Species of bird

The varied solitaire (Myadestes coloratus) is a Near Threatened species of bird in the family Turdidae, the thrushes. It is found in Colombia and Panama.

== Taxonomy and systematics ==
The varied solitaire was originally described in 1912 with its current binomial Myadestes coloratus and English name. During the middle of the twentieth century several authors treated what are now the varied solitaire, the black-faced solitaire (M. malanops), and Andean solitaire (M. ralloides) as conspecific. They are not well differentiated and form a superspecies.

The varied solitaire is monotypic.

== Description ==
The varied solitaire is 16 to 18 cm (6.3 to 7.1 in) long and weighs 24 to 34 g (0.85 to 1.2 oz). The sexes have the same plumage. Adults have a smudgy blackish forehead, face, and chin on an otherwise pale slate-gray head and neck. Their back, rump, and uppertail coverts are warm brown. Their wings have warm brown upperwing coverts and blackish primary coverts and flight feathers. Their tail is blackish with paler outer feathers and pale gray feather tips. Their underparts are pale slate-gray. They have a yellow bill and yellow legs and feet. Juveniles have olive-brown upperparts with whitish and buffy streaks and spots, a black tail, and brownish underparts with white spots.

== Distribution and habitat ==
The varied solitaire has a disjunct distribution. It is found in eastern Panama in the Serranía de Majé, on Cerro Tacarcuna, and on Cerro Pirre. It also is found on Alto de Nique and Cerro Quía on the Panama-Colombia border. It inhabits montane evergreen forest and cloudforest in the upper tropical and subtropical zones. One source states its overall elevation range as 800 to 2,200 m (2,600 to 7,200 ft). Another places it mostly from 1,100 to 1,500 m (3,600 to 4,900 ft) and lower at 900 m (3,000 ft) on the summit of Cerro Quía in Panama. A third places it at 800 to 1,000 m (2,600 to 3,300 ft) in Colombia.

== Behavior ==
=== Movement ===
The varied solitaire is primarily a sedentary year-round resident though some elevational movements are suspected.

=== Feeding ===
The varied solitaire's diet and foraging behavior have not been studied. It is known to feed on fruit.

=== Breeding ===
The varied solitaire's breeding season includes at least April to June. Nothing else is known about the species' breeding biology.

=== Vocalization ===
The varied solitaire's song is "a leisurely series of drawn-out single notes or flute-like phrases with intervening pauses of 3–6 seconds, sometimes with a few less musical notes interspersed".

== Status ==
The IUCN originally in 1988 assessed the varied solitaire as being of Least Concern but since 2021 as Near Threatened. It has a small range and its estimated population of between 20,000 and 50,000 mature individuals is believed to be decreasing. "Due to its high dependence on cloud forests, the species is threatened by the loss and degradation of its habitat...the impact of habitat loss on the population size is thought to be low." It is considered local and rare in Colombia. In Panama it occurs in several protected areas and is numerous in some of them.
