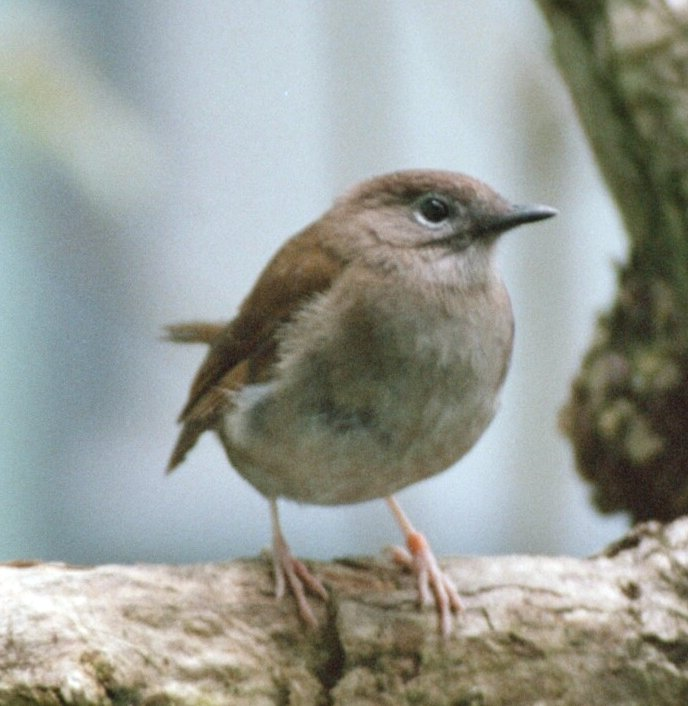

Conservation status
- Critically Endangered (IUCN 3.1)

Scientific classification
- Kingdom: Animalia
- Phylum: Chordata
- Class: Aves
- Order: Passeriformes
- Family: Turdidae
- Genus: Myadestes
- Species: M. palmeri

Binomial name
- Myadestes palmeri (Rothschild, 1893)

Synonyms
- Phaeornis palmeri

= Puaiohi =

Species of bird

The puaiohi (Myadestes palmeri) or small Kauaʻi thrush is a rare species of songbird in the thrush family, Turdidae, that is endemic to the Hawaiian island of Kauaʻi. It is closely related to the other three endemic Hawaiian thrushes, the kāmaʻo, olomaʻo, and ʻōmaʻo. It was first collected by Henry Palmer in 1891 at Halemanu around the entrance to the Kōkeʻe State Park.

== Description ==
The plumage is mostly nondescript, with slaty-brown upperparts and a light gray breast and belly below. Birds have a black bill and pinkish feet. A white eye ring is also fairly prominent and helps distinguish this bird from the other Hawaiian thrushes. Males and females are highly similar in appearance. Juveniles show a pattern transitioning from a spotted whitish-buff above to a scalloped gray-brown below.

== Distribution and habitat ==
Historically, this species has always been considered rare, favoring forested ravines above 1,050 metres (3,440 ft). Puaiohi are restricted to the center and southern parts of the Alakaʻi Wilderness Preserve on the Hawaiian island of Kauaʻi. Seventy-five percent of the breeding population occurs in only 10 square kilometres (3.9 sq mi) of forest.

== Diet and behavior ==
Outside the breeding season, most (82%) of the diet is fruit and berries, the remainder being insects and other invertebrates. Important food sources include fruits of the native ʻolapa (Cheirodendron trigynum), lapalapa (C. platyphyllum), ʻōhiʻa ha (Syzygium sandwicensis) and kanawao (Broussaisia arguta). In the breeding season, over fifty percent of the diet shifts to invertebrates. The song is varied, consisting of a simple trill to a complex wheezing, and high-pitched squeal described as a squeaking rather resembling a metal wheel needing lubrication. Males sing throughout the year, but do so with increasing frequency as the breeding season approaches, peaking from April to May. Nesting has been recorded from as early as March to as late as mid-September. Nests are built in cavities or ledges of cliff faces, concealed by mosses and ferns, but tree cavities are also used. Females are the sole nest builders, and nest building can take up to seven days. Females also incubate the eggs and broods and feeds the nestlings. Eggs (usually two per clutch) are grayish-green to greenish-blue with irregular reddish-brown splotches. Eggs hatch after 13–15 days. After fledging, the male becomes the primary food provider to the young, while the female attempts a second brood. Females will also attempt to re-nest if the first attempt fails.

== Status and protection ==
According to recent data, population estimates range from 414 to 580 birds, and have remained somewhat stable since 1973, although a study published in 1986 estimated a population of approximately 100-125 birds. Puaiohi populations are vulnerable to drought, hurricanes, and mammalian predation of both eggs and young. Avian malaria also affects many birds, but a few birds have shown some resistance. (C. Atkinson, USGS, unpublished data). Feral pigs and goats also negatively affect populations of birds by degrading habitat, as has competition from many invasive plants and animals. The puaiohi was added to the United States Federal Endangered Species List on March 11, 1967. In 1995, a captive breeding program was established. Some birds from this program were being taken back to the Alakaʻi to supplement the wild population, though this program has been liquidated and released after inbreeding depression was observed in the captive population.
