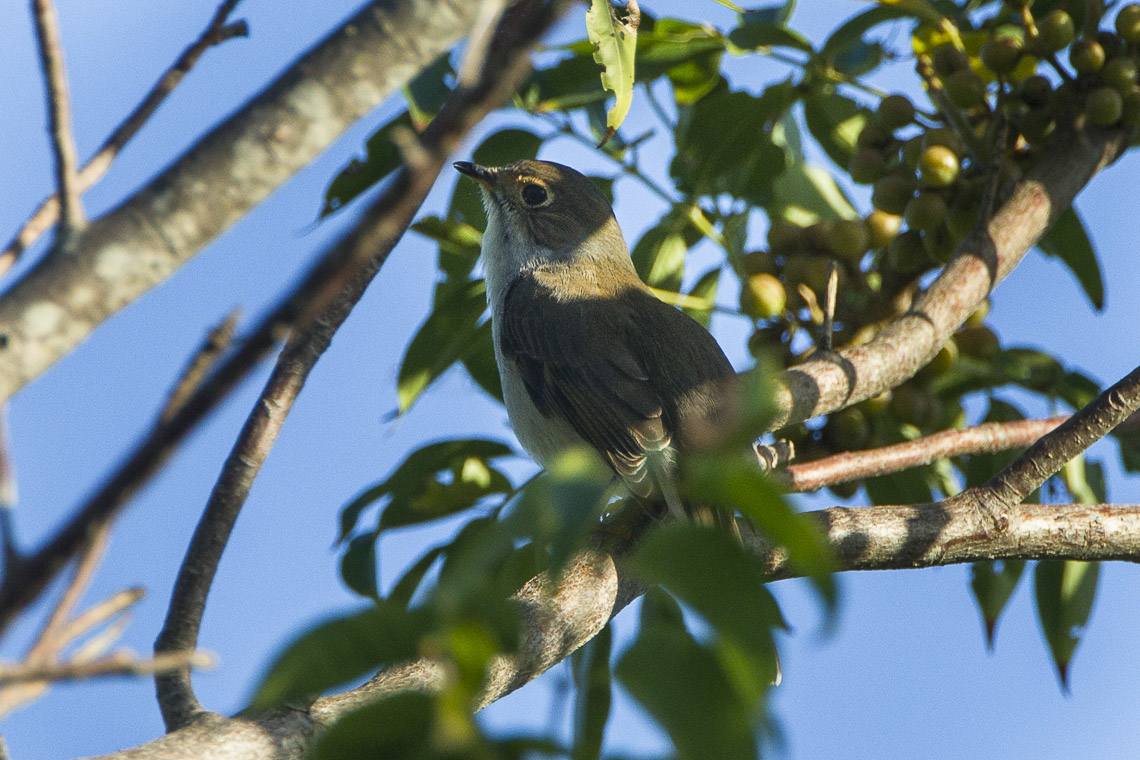

Conservation status
- Least Concern (IUCN 3.1)

Scientific classification
- Kingdom: Animalia
- Phylum: Chordata
- Class: Aves
- Order: Passeriformes
- Family: Turdidae
- Genus: Myadestes
- Species: M. elisabeth

Binomial name
- Myadestes elisabeth (Lembeye, 1850)

= Cuban solitaire =

Species of bird

The Cuban solitaire (Myadestes elisabeth), also known as the Cuban nightingale, is a species of bird in the family Turdidae, the thrushes. It is endemic to Cuba.

== Taxonomy and systematics ==
The Cuban solitaire was originally described in 1850 as Muscicapa elisabeth, erroneously placing it as an Old World flycatcher.

The Cuban solitaire is monotypic. It previously had a second subspecies, M. e. retrusus (Bangs & Zappey, 1905), which went extinct in the 1930s.

== Description ==
The Cuban solitaire is 19 to 20.5 cm (7.5 to 8.1 in) long and weighs 21.5 to 33 g (0.76 to 1.2 oz). The sexes have the same plumage. Adults have dull whitish lores, a thin whitish eye-ring, and a dark brown malar line dividing a dull whitish lower face. The rest of their head and their upperparts are olive brown. Their wings are mostly olive brown with warmer brown on the primaries' edges, the secondaries' bases, and the tertials. Their chin, throat, and underparts are dull whitish that is slightly grayer on the breast. They have a blackish maxilla, a dusky-tipped horn colored mandible, and yellowish brown legs and feet. Juveniles resemble adults but with buff flecks and streaks on the upperparts and brown mottling on the underparts.

== Distribution and habitat ==
The Cuban solitaire has a disjunct distribution on the island of Cuba. One population is in the far western Pinar del Río and Artemisa provinces and the others are in the former Oriente Province in the east. It inhabits pine, semi-deciduous, and evergreen forest in the hills and mountains. In elevation it reaches 2,000 m (6,600 ft).

== Behavior ==
=== Movement ===
The Cuban solitaire is believed to be a sedentary year-round resident.

=== Feeding ===
The Cuban solitaire feeds on insects and fruit; the latter includes ripe pine nuts. It forages primarily in the forest canopy but on slopes may feed near the ground. It makes sallies from a perch to take insects in mid-air or from vegetation. It takes fruit while briefly hovering during a sally.

=== Breeding ===
The Cuban solitaire breeds between February and July. It makes a cup nest from thin plant fibers, rootlets, and hair with moss and lichens on the outside. It is placed in a rock crevice or a hole in a tree and is typically well hidden. The clutch is three eggs that are pale green heavily spotted with brown. The incubation period, time to fledging, and details of parental care are not known.

=== Vocalization ===
The Cuban solitaires song is "high-pitched and flute-like...melodious and varied" and likened to the sound of rubbing a wet finger on glass. Its call is "short and whistle-like".

== Status ==
The IUCN originally in 1988 assessed the Cuban solitaire as being of Least Concern, then in 1994 as Near Threatened, and since 2025 as again of Least Concern. It has two widely separated subpopulations; its estimated population of between 10,000 and 50,000 mature individuals is believed to be decreasing. "Locally within this species' range, forest is under conversion to cultivation and pasture, and there has been a recent expansion of cacao, coffee and tobacco production. However much of this species' range is relatively secure owing to its restriction to areas of low human population density that are comparatively difficult to access." It is considered "common but quite local". It occurs in at least 10 protected areas.
