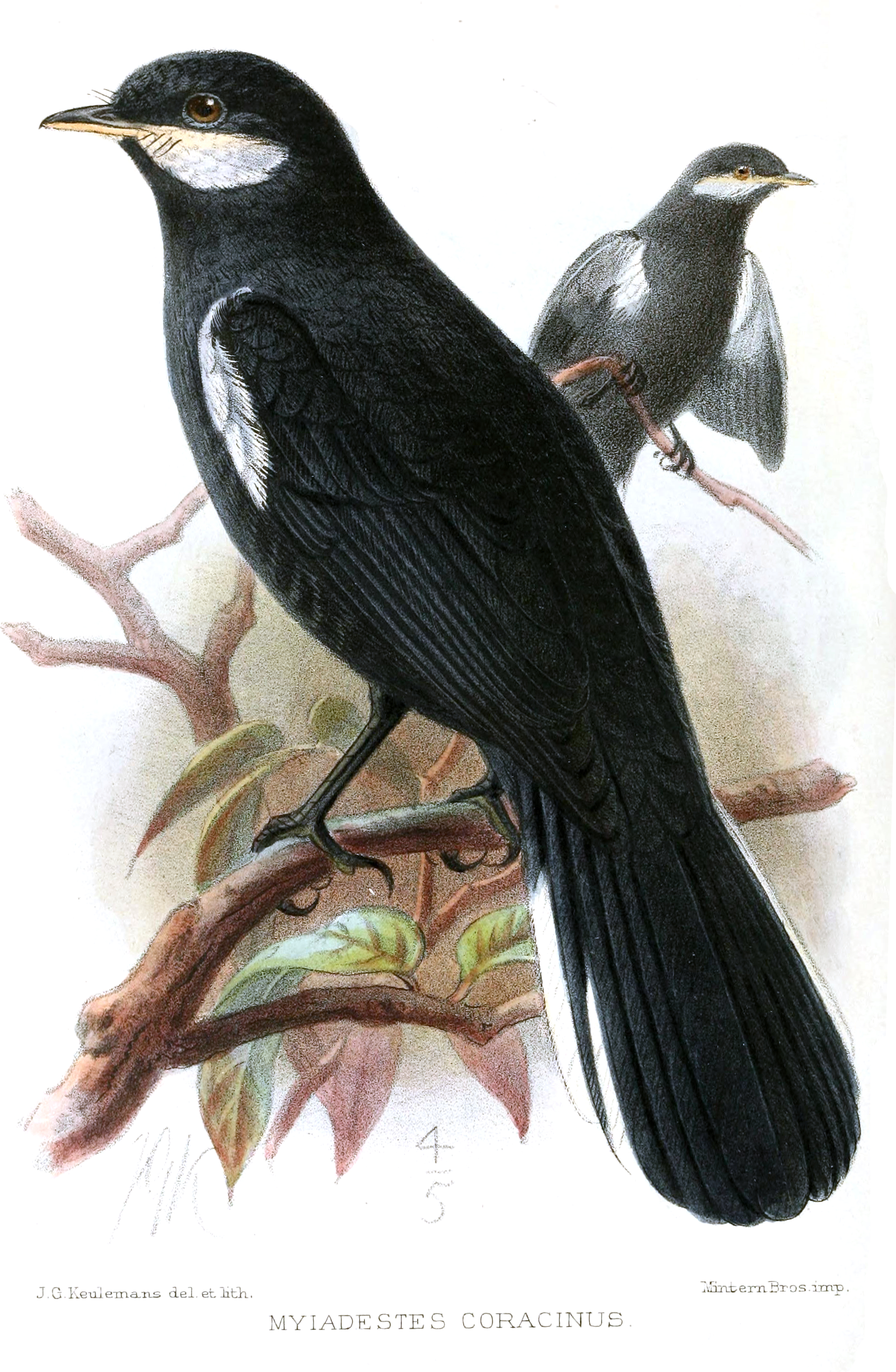
- Entomodestes coracinus

Scientific classification
- Kingdom: Animalia
- Phylum: Chordata
- Class: Aves
- Order: Passeriformes
- Family: Turdidae
- Genus: Entomodestes; Stejneger, 1883

Type species
- Ptilogonys leucotis von Tschudi, 1844

Species
- E. coracinus E. leucotis

= Entomodestes =

Genus of birds

Entomodestes is a small genus of birds in the thrush family. They are found in humid Andean highland forest in South America. The two species both have black underparts and head, and a white patch on the lower face, but differ in the colour of the back.

== Species ==
Image	Common name	Scientific name	Distribution
	Black solitaire	Entomodestes coracinus	Colombia and Ecuador.
	White-eared solitaire	Entomodestes leucotis	Bolivia and Peru
