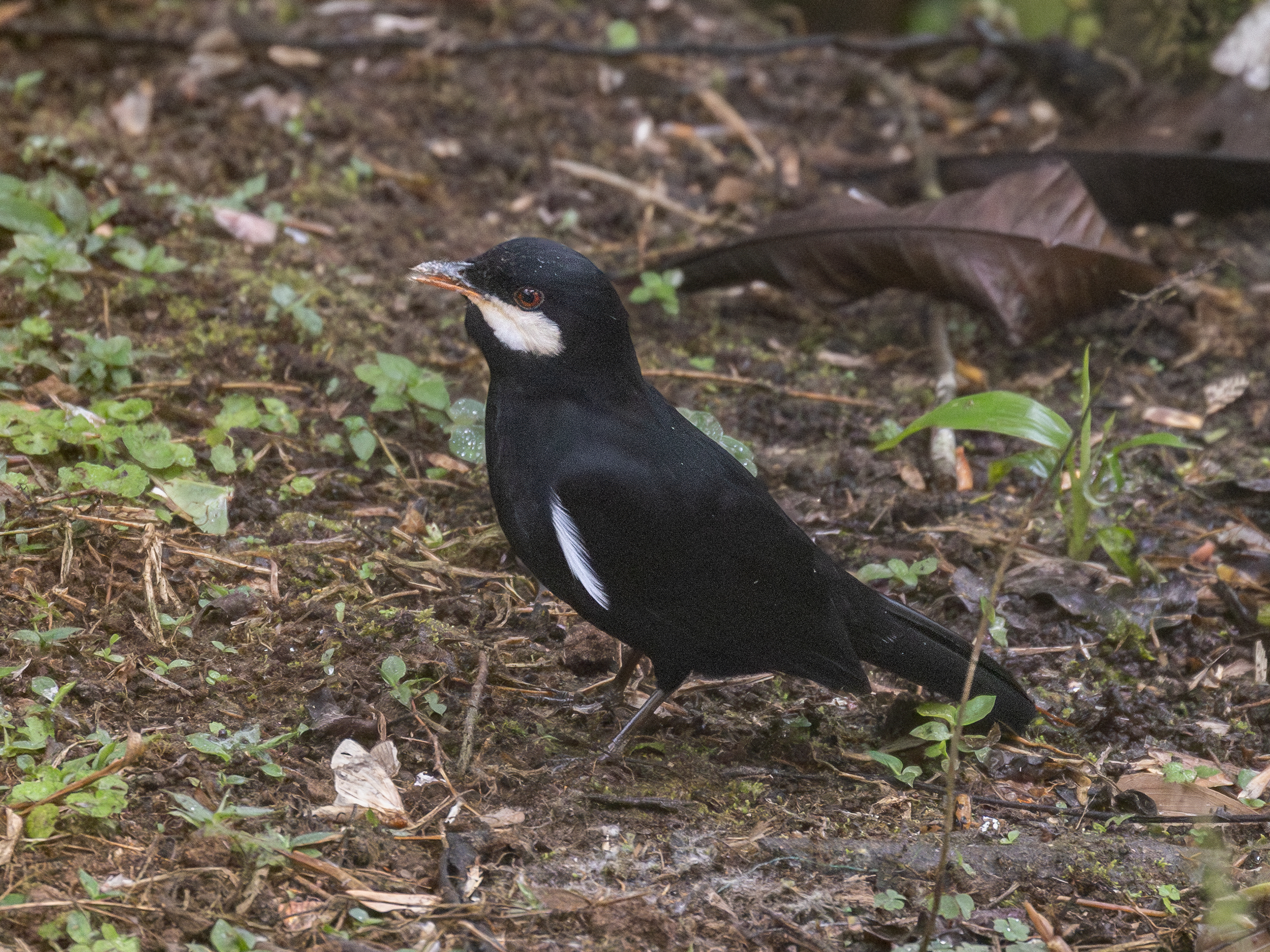

Conservation status
- Least Concern (IUCN 3.1)

Scientific classification
- Kingdom: Animalia
- Phylum: Chordata
- Class: Aves
- Order: Passeriformes
- Family: Turdidae
- Genus: Entomodestes
- Species: E. coracinus

Binomial name
- Entomodestes coracinus (Berlepsch, 1897)

= Black solitaire =

Species of bird

The black solitaire (Entomodestes coracinus) is a species of bird in the family Turdidae, the thrushes. It is found in Colombia and Ecuador.

== Taxonomy and systematics ==
The black solitaire was originally described in 1897 as Myiadestes corcinus. It was later reassigned to its current genus Entomodestes that had been erected in 1883.

The black solitaire is monotypic. It shares its genus with the white-eared solitaire (E. leucotis) and the two form a superspecies.

== Description ==
The black solitaire is about 23 cm (9.1 in) long; one individual weighed 56 g (2.0 oz). The sexes have the same plumage. Adults are almost entirely glossy black. They have silvery white "cheeks" from the base of the bill to the ear coverts, white underwing coverts, and white lower halves of their outer tail feathers. They have a red iris, a black maxilla, a yellowish orange mandible, and dark grayish brown legs and feet. Juveniles are mostly dull brown with less white than adults.

== Distribution and habitat ==
The black solitaire is a bird of the Chocó region from Chocó Department in west-central Colombia south to Pichincha Province in northwestern Ecuador. It is found intermittently within that overall range. It inhabits the interior and edges of wet forest in the tropical and lower subtropical zones and occasionally is found in secondary forest. It especially favors forest that is dense with mosses. In elevation it is found between 400 and 2,300 m (1,300 and 7,500 ft) in Colombia and between 1,100 and 1,600 m (3,600 and 5,200 ft) in Ecuador.

== Behavior ==
=== Movement ===
The black solitaire is "a rather unpredictable altitudinal migrant".

=== Feeding ===
The black solitaire feeds on fruit, taking it at all levels of the forest. It primarily forages singly or in pairs but will share fruiting trees with small numbers of its and other species.

=== Breeding ===
The black solitaire's breeding season has not been fully defined but includes July. It makes a cup nest from moss lined with rootlets, placed in dense vegetation such as bromeliads and vine tangles. The clutch is two eggs that are light green with small brown speckles. The incubation period, time to fledging, and details of parental care are not known.

=== Vocalization ===
The black solitaire sings infrequently. Its song is "a weak but surprisingly far-carrying long wreeeeeeeenh...with a ringing but at the same time almost nasal quality". Its call is "a much weaker tseeu".

== Status ==
The IUCN has assessed the black solitaire as being of Least Concern. It has a limited range; its population size is not known and is believed to be decreasing. No immediate threats have been identified. It is "uncommon and inconspicuous" in Colombia and "scarce and local" in Ecuador.
