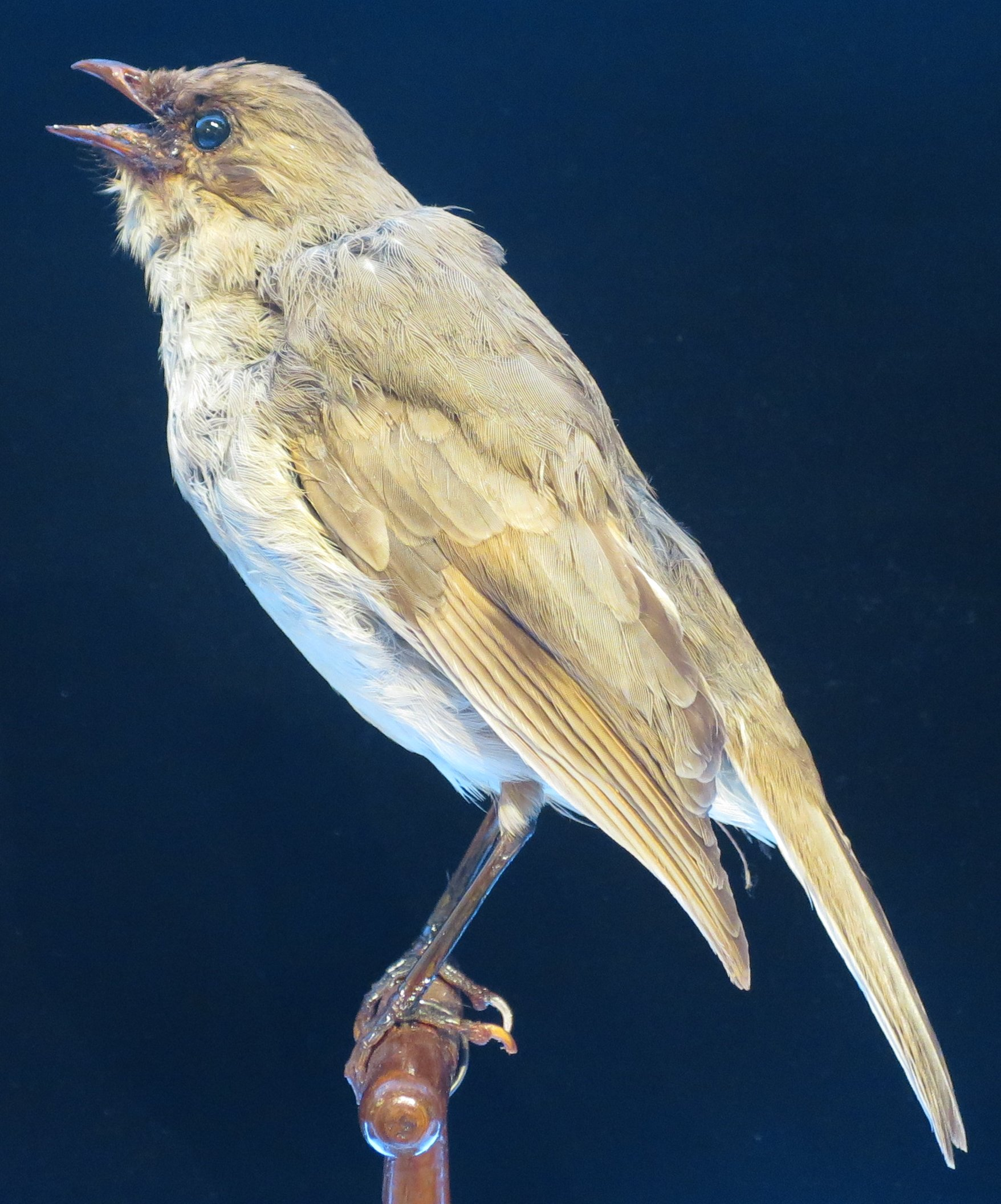

Conservation status
- Extinct (1989) (IUCN 3.1)

Scientific classification
- Kingdom: Animalia
- Phylum: Chordata
- Class: Aves
- Order: Passeriformes
- Family: Turdidae
- Genus: Myadestes
- Species: †M. myadestinus

Binomial name
- †Myadestes myadestinus (Stejneger, 1887)

= Kāmaʻo =

Extinct species of bird

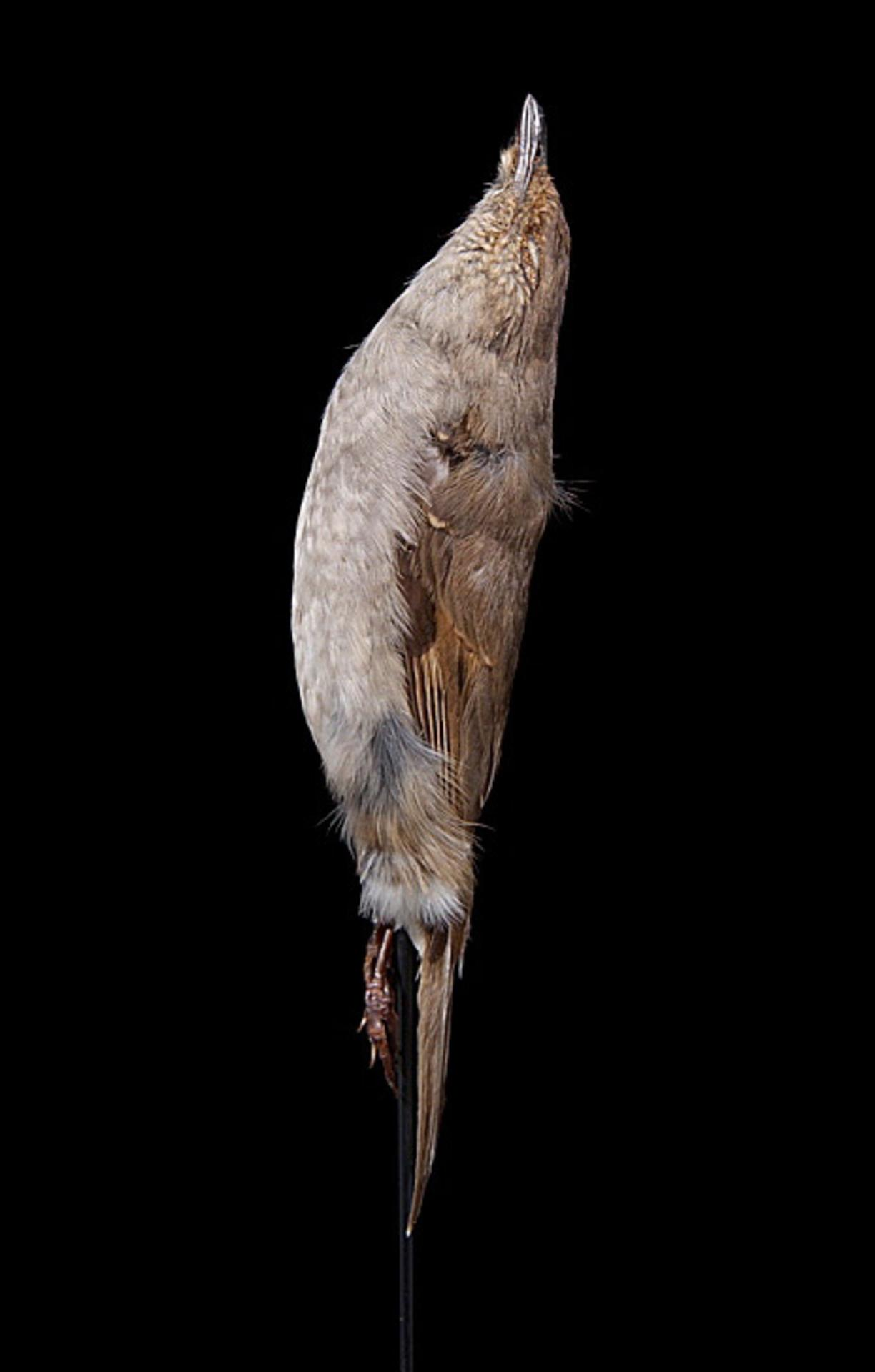

The kāmaʻo or large Kauaʻi thrush (Myadestes myadestinus) is an extinct species of small, dark solitaire that was endemic to Kauaʻi in the Hawaiian Islands.

== Characteristics ==
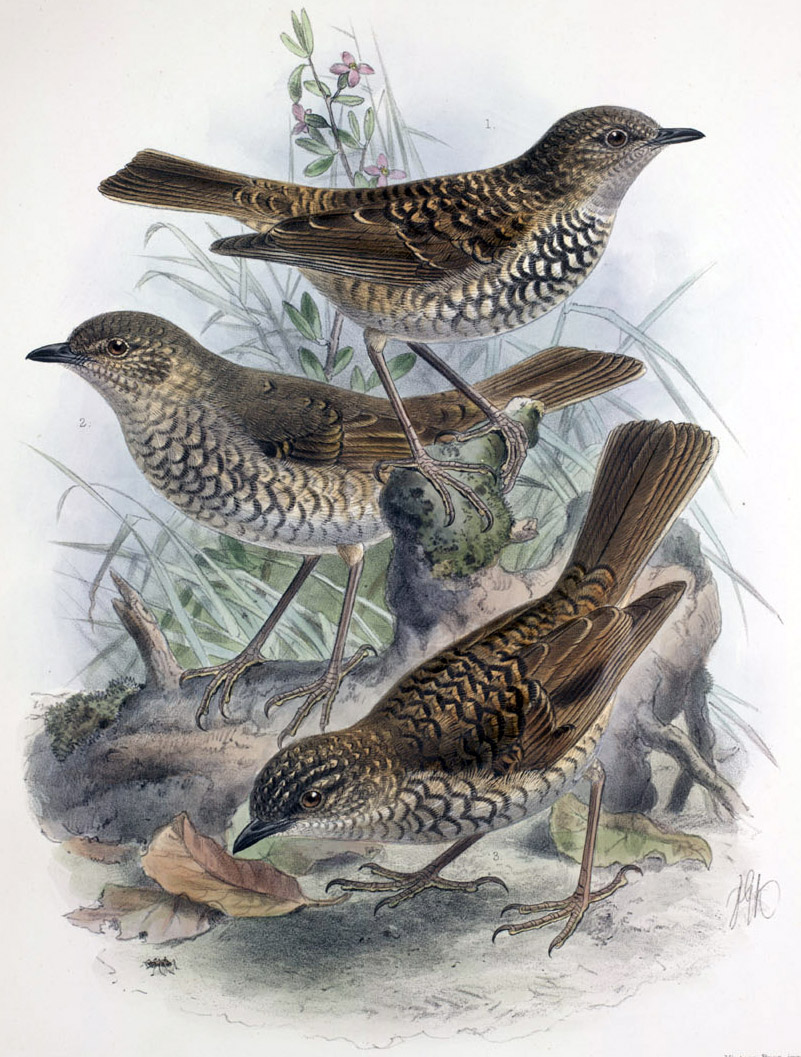
Myadestes myadestinus (top), Myadestes lanaiensis lanaiensis (middle). and Myadestes obscurus (bottom)

The adult bird grew up to 8 inches (20 cm) in length. The male and female of the species looked similar. It was dark brown above and gray below, with black legs. It was closely related to the other species of Hawaiian thrushes, the Puaiohi (M. palmeri), the ʻŌmaʻo (M. obscurus) and the likely-extinct olomaʻo (M. lanaiensis).

Its song was a complex melody composed of flute-like notes, liquid warbles, buzzy trills, and gurgling whistles. The call was a raspy "braak," with an alternate high pitched note similar to a police whistle. The bird occurred in the understory of densely vegetated gulches, where it often perched motionlessly in a hunched posture. Like other native Hawaiian thrushes, it often quivered its wings and fed primarily on fruit and insects.

There was no segregation on the thrushes that existed either on Molokai or Lanai, which were given the name Olomao. In addition, there was no confirmation of any thrush sighting on Maui. On Kauai, there were more than one thrush species that were documented and accounted for. With a fighter-jet-like flying maneuver, the thrush used to fly vertically while singing melodies and then flying down into the lower lush canopy.

While not confirmed, but it was never seen flying below 3,500 feet in Kauai. Even though the bird was a frequent resident, the last documented sighting was in 1989, but it was not documented in a 2000 bird survey.

== Extinction ==
In the late 1800s, it was considered the most common bird on Kauaʻi, occurring throughout all areas of the island, but land clearing and avian malaria brought on by introduced mosquitoes decimated the birds. Introduced animals such as feral pigs (which create pools for their wallows, in which mosquitoes can breed) and rats (which feed on eggs and unfledged birds) also contributed to the bird's demise. Competition from introduced bird species may also have led to further declines.

The kāmaʻo is classified as extinct. The last probable sighting occurred in 1989 in the Alakaʻi Wilderness Preserve, its last stronghold. On September 29, 2021, the U.S. Fish and Wildlife Service declared the large Kauaʻi thrush extinct. The species was delisted from the Endangered Species Act on October 16, 2023.
