= Juan Lembeye =

Spanish naturalist (1816–1889)

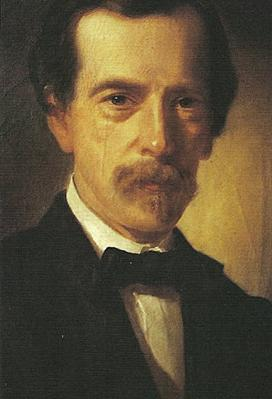
- Born: 21 October 1816; Ferrol, Galicia, Spain
- Died: 1 December 1889 (aged 73); Culleredo, Galicia, Spain
- Known for: Aves de la Isla de Cuba (Birds of the island of Cuba)
- Scientific career
- Fields: Ornithology, illustration
- Author abbrev. (zoology): Lembeye

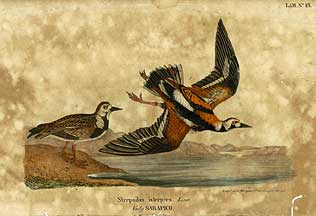
Ruddy turnstone from Aves de la Isla de Cuba

Juan Lembeye (1816 in Ferrol – 1889 in Culleredo) was a Spanish naturalist.

Lembeye was the author of Aves de la Isla de Cuba (1850), the only book of bird illustrations to be published in Cuba. Born in Galicia, Lembeye lived in Cuba from the 1830s to the 1860s, and became interested in birds while he was there. The majority of the 38 drawings in Lembeye's book were copied from the royal octavo plates of John James Audubon; in some cases, he even copied the plants depicted in the background. The bee hummingbird (Mellisuga helenae) was described in his book for the first time by Juan Gundlach.

Lembeye discovered Cuban solitaire (Myadestes elisabeth) and yellow-headed warbler (Teretistris fernandinae), and is commemorated in the specific name of Cuban gnatcatcher, Polioptila lembeyei. His colleagues included Juan Gundlach and Victor López Seoane.
