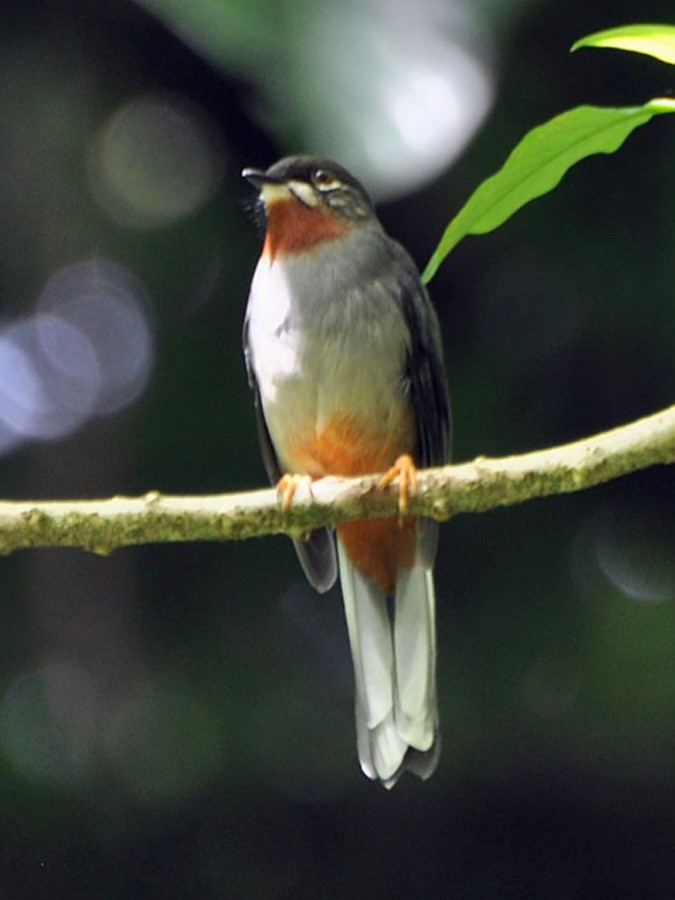

Conservation status
- Least Concern (IUCN 3.1)

Scientific classification
- Kingdom: Animalia
- Phylum: Chordata
- Class: Aves
- Order: Passeriformes
- Family: Turdidae
- Genus: Myadestes
- Species: M. genibarbis

Binomial name
- Myadestes genibarbis Swainson, 1838

= Rufous-throated solitaire =

Species of bird

The rufous-throated solitaire (Myadestes genibarbis) is a species of bird in the family Turdidae, the thrushes. It is found Jamaica, Hispaniola, and in the Lesser Antilles islands of Dominica, Martinique, St. Lucia, and St. Vincent.

== Taxonomy and systematics ==
The rufous-throated solitaire was originally described in 1838 as Myidestes [sic] genibarbis with the English name "whiskered fantail".

The rufous-throated solitaire has these six subspecies:

- M. g. solitarius Baird, SF, 1866
- M. g. montanus Cory, 1881
- M. g. dominicanus Stejneger, 1882
- M. g. genibarbis Swainson, 1838
- M. g. sanctaeluciae Stejneger, 1882
- M. g. sibilans Lawrence, 1878

Subspecies M. g. sibilans was originally described as a species and is sometimes called the "St. Vincent solitaire". The American Ornithological Society and the Clements taxonomy distinguish it as a monotypic group within the species. This subspecies differs the most in appearance of the six, though M. g. solitarius is genetically most different.

== Local names ==
The bird is nicknamed the siffleur montagne (or mountain whistler) in Dominica; a local folk group of the early 1970s, the Siffleur Montagne Chorale, named themselves after it. In the Dominican Republic the bird is called "Jilguero" and in Haiti "Mizisyen".

== Description ==
The rufous-throated solitaire is 19 to 20.5 cm (7.5 to 8.1 in) long and weighs 24 to 30 g (0.85 to 1.1 oz). The sexes have the same plumage. Adults of the nominate subspecies M. g. genibarbis have a slate-gray crown, a white crescent below the eye, and a dark malar stripe on an otherwise orange-flecked face. Their upperparts are slate-gray. Their wings are slate-gray with black primary coverts, black bases on the secondaries, white bases on the inner primaries, and pale edges on the flight feathers. Their tail is mostly slate-gray with whitish outer feathers. Their chin is whitish, their throat chestnut, their breast medium gray, and their belly and vent ochraceous-tawny. Juveniles are darker than adults, with orange-buff spots and streaks on their upperparts, orange-buff and slaty scallops on most of their underparts, and plain orange-buff vent and undertail coverts.

The other subspecies differ from the nominate and each other thus:

- M. g. solitarius: slightly larger, with a longer tail and brighter throat
- M. g. montanus: shorter tail, paler throat, and almost plain ear coverts (not orange-flecked)
- M. g. dominicanus: darker gray upperparts, much darker underparts with more gray, and streakier ear coverts
- M. g. sanctaeluciae: similar to domincanus but with a paler throat, more white in the tail, and more orange on the lower belly
- M. g. sibilans: almost black upperparts with olive uppertail coverts; paler underparts, a longer black malar stripe below an ochraceous-rufous stripe, and throat color that blends into the breast

All subspecies have a black bill and yellowish legs and feet.

== Distribution and habitat ==
The subspecies of the rufous-throated solitaire are found thus:

- M. g. solitarius: Jamaica
- M. g. montanus: Hispaniola (Haiti and the Dominican Republic)
- M. g. dominicanus Dominica
- M. g. genibarbis: Martinique
- M. g. sanctaeluciae: St. Lucia
- M. g. sibilans: St. Vincent

The rufous-throated solitaire primarily inhabits dense, moist, lowland and montane evergreen forest in the tropical zone, from sea level to 1,800 m (5,900 ft). It also occurs in groves along streams that traverse meadows.

== Behavior ==
=== Movement ===
The rufous-throated solitaire is generally considered a year-round resident. However, at least in Jamaica and the Dominican Republic it moves from higher to lower elevations for the winter.

=== Feeding ===
The rufous-throated solitaire feeds on fruit and insects. It forages mostly in trees though often in low vegetation; young birds may forage on the ground. It plucks fruit with aerial sallies from a perch; insects are plucked from vegetation with a sally, taken in mid-air, and taken from the ground by pouncing from a perch.

=== Breeding ===
The rufous-throated solitaire breeds between March and August; in the eastern Caribbean breeding is concentrated between May and July. It builds a cup nest in a crevice, in a hole in an earthen bank or tree, among vines, or atop a tree fern or bromeliad. The clutch is two to three eggs that are bluish white or blue with reddish brown spots. The incubation period, time to fledging, and details of parental care are not known.

=== Vocalization ===
The rufous-throated solitaire sings mostly at dawn, a "hauntingly beautiful minor key whistle". The song is a highly ventriloquial "first note low, second high, third low, interspersed with [a] ringing double note". Its calls include a "single long toot" that sounds like a distant car horn.

== Status ==
The IUCN has assessed the rufous-throated solitaire as being of Least Concern. Its population size is not known and is believed to be decreasing. No immediate threats have been identified. A 2003 field guide considered it fairly common throughout its range. It remains fairly common in the Dominican Republic but is much reduced in Haiti due to habitat destruction.
