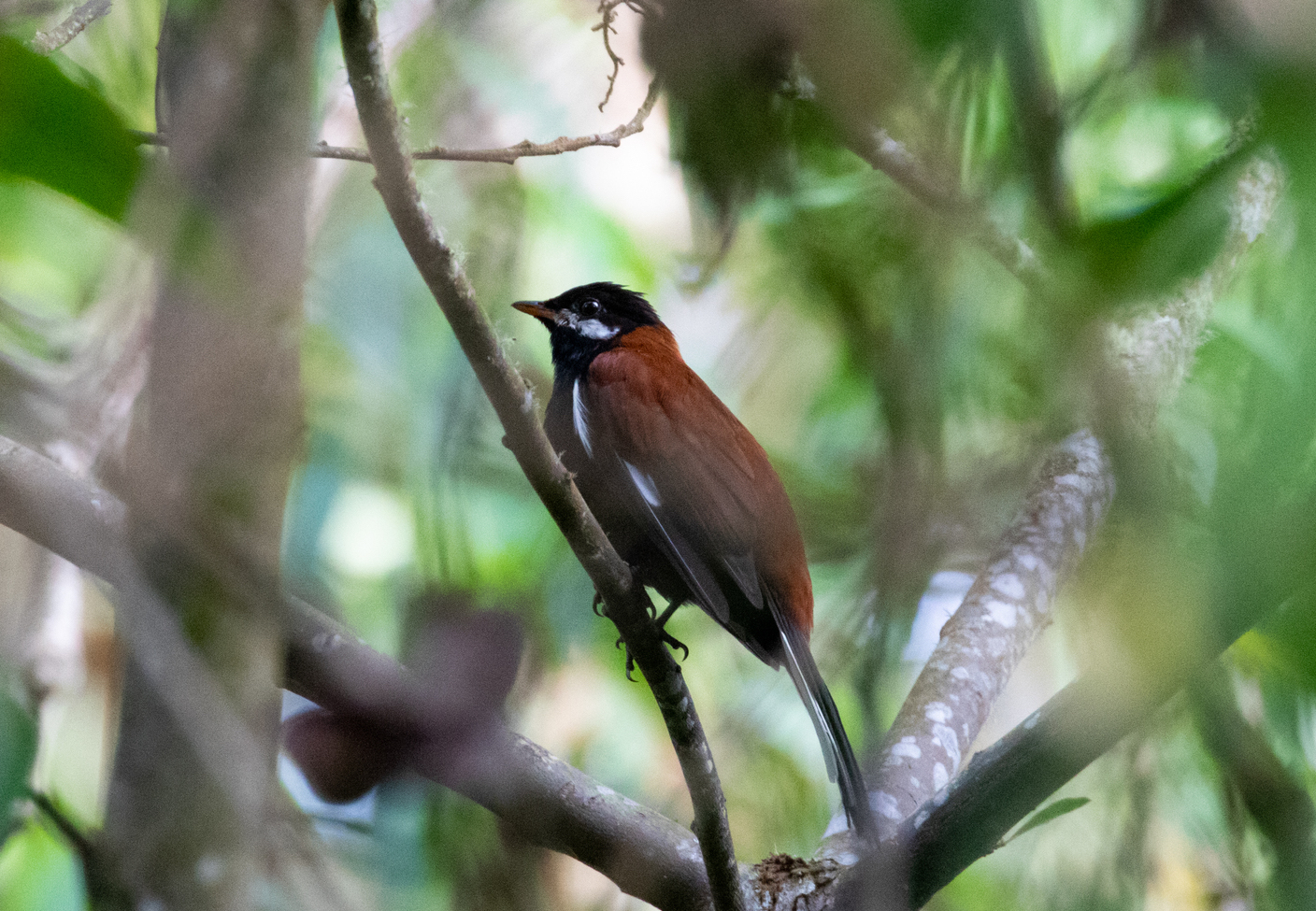

Conservation status
- Least Concern (IUCN 3.1)

Scientific classification
- Kingdom: Animalia
- Phylum: Chordata
- Class: Aves
- Order: Passeriformes
- Family: Turdidae
- Genus: Entomodestes
- Species: E. leucotis

Binomial name
- Entomodestes leucotis (Tschudi, 1844)

= White-eared solitaire =

Species of bird

The white-eared solitaire (Entomodestes leucotis) is a species of bird in the family Turdidae, the thrushes. It is found in Bolivia and Peru.

== Taxonomy and systematics ==
The white-eared solitaire was originally described in 1844 as Ptilogonys leucotis. It was later reassigned to its current genus Entomodestes that Leonhard Stejneger erected for it in 1883.

The white-eared solitaire is monotypic. It shares its genus with the black solitaire (E. coracinus) and the two form a superspecies.

== Description ==
The white-eared solitaire is 22 to 24 cm (8.7 to 9.4 in) long and weighs about 58 g (2.0 oz). Adult males have a large white patch from their bill through their ear coverts on an otherwise black head. They have a rich chestnut nape and upperparts with some white in the carpal area. Their wing coverts are rich chestnut and their flight feathers blackish with a wide white bar on the underside. Their tail is mostly blackish with white on the ends of the outer feathers. Their underparts are black. Adult females have a browner crown than males and some brown on their underparts. Both sexes have a red to brown iris, a black maxilla, a yellow mandible, and blackish legs and feet. Juveniles are duller overall than adults with a rufous crown and browner underparts.

== Distribution and habitat ==
The white-eared solitaire is found on the eastern slope of the Andes from central Amazonas Department in northern Peru south into Bolivia as far as central Santa Cruz Department. It inhabits the interior and edges of humid montane forest and cloudforest. Overall it ranges in elevation mostly from 1,500 to 2,800 m (4,900 to 9,200 ft) but in Peru is found from 1,200 to 2,900 m (3,900 to 9,500 ft).

== Behavior ==
=== Movement ===
The white-eared solitaire is believed to be a sedentary year-round resident.

=== Feeding ===
The white-eared solitaire feeds on fruits, insects, and seeds. It forages mostly in the forest's middle strata. It sometimes forages in loose groups and joins mixed-species feeding flocks.

=== Breeding ===
The white-eared solitaire's breeding season has not been fully defined but includes October and November. Nothing else is known about its breeding biology.

=== Vocalization ===
The white-eared solitaire's song is "a single, ringing, even note" that is repeated about every 10 to 20 seconds. In the more northerly part of its range the song "tends to be a little more musical, although sounds 'rusty' " and from Cuzco Department south is "flatter, buzzier, and more nasal: zzzeeee". Its calls are "a quiet dzz and a high, ringing tseee". Its alarm call is "a low growl".

== Status ==
The IUCN has assessed the white-eared solitaire as being of Least Concern. Its population size is not known and is believed to be decreasing. No immediate threats have been identified. It is considered fairly common in Peru.
