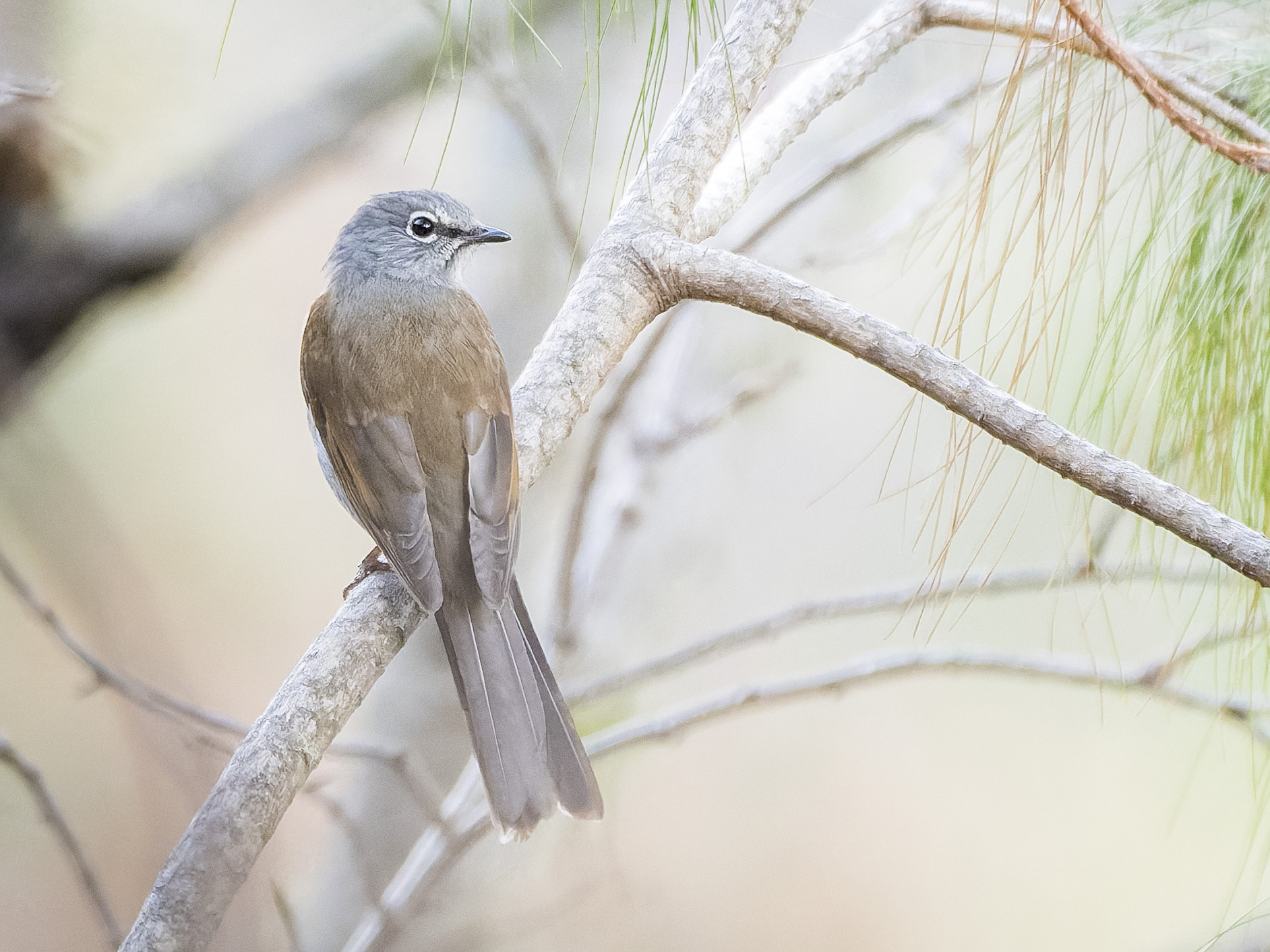

Conservation status
- Least Concern (IUCN 3.1)

Scientific classification
- Kingdom: Animalia
- Phylum: Chordata
- Class: Aves
- Order: Passeriformes
- Family: Turdidae
- Genus: Myadestes
- Species: M. occidentalis

Binomial name
- Myadestes occidentalis Stejneger, 1882

= Brown-backed solitaire =

Species of bird

The brown-backed solitaire (Myadestes occidentalis) is a thrush found in montane pine-oak woodlands from Mexico to Honduras.

== Taxonomy and systematics ==
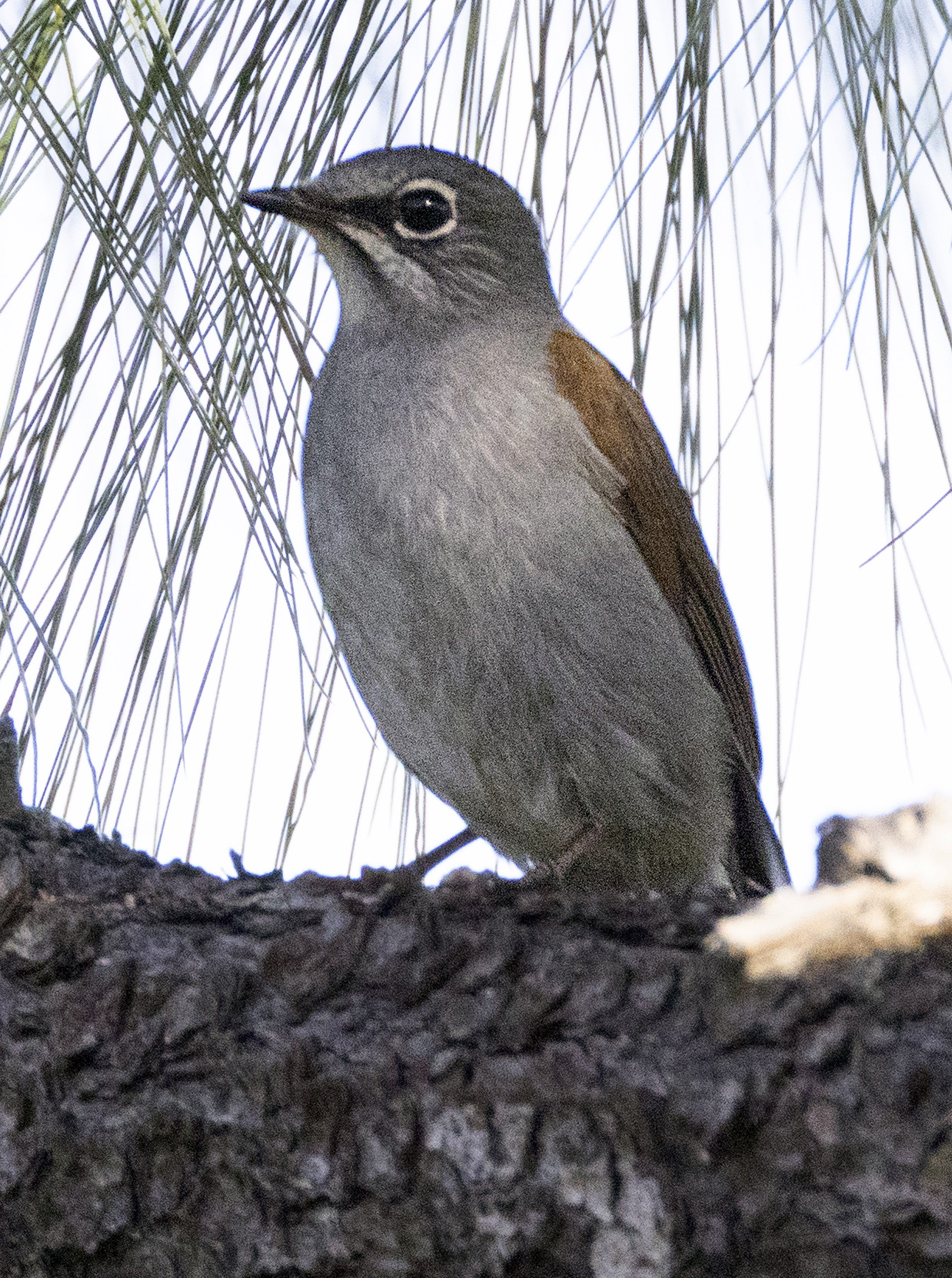
Jalisco, Mexico

The brown-backed solitaire was originally described as Myadestes obscurus. In 1882, Stejneger split it as the mainland Myadestes obscurus var occidentalis and Myadestes obscurus var. insularis, endemic to the Tres Marías Islands. However, the merger of the Hawaiian genus Phaeornis into Myadestes created a case of secondary homonymy, as the ʻŌmaʻo, originally described as Muscicapa obscura Gmelin, 1789, also became known as Myadestes obscurus. Since Gmelin's name had priority over Myadestes obscurus Lafresnaye, 1839, the latter was replaced by the next available name, Myadestes occidentalis Stejneger, 1882.

In addition to the subspecies M. o. occidentalis and M. o. insularis (both Stejneger, 1882), the brown-backed solitaire has a third subspecies, M. o. oberhoseri (Dickey & van Rossem, 1925), which is found further south than the other two.

== Description ==
The brown-backed solitaire is 20.5 to 21.5 cm (8.1 to 8.5 in) long and weighs 38 to 44 g (1.3 to 1.6 oz). The sexes have the same plumage. Adults of the nominate subspecies M. o. occidentalis have black lores with a white stripe above them, a broken white eye-ring, a white "moustache" stripe, black cheeks, and a white chin and upper throat on an otherwise dull darkish gray head. Their upper back is dull darkish gray that becomes olive-rufous on the rump and tail; the outer tail feathers have white tips. Their scapulars and the edges of their wing feathers are a richer rusty brown. Their breast is dull darkish gray that fades to a paler gray on the belly. They have a black bill and grayish pink legs and feet. Juveniles resemble adults with the addition of whitish buff edges on their body feathers that give a spotted appearance. Subspecies M. o. insularis has more white on its throat and slightly paler gray upperparts than the nominate. M. o. oberhoseri has more and deeper gray on its underparts than the nominate and also reddish brown legs and feet.

== Distribution and habitat ==
The brown-backed solitaire has a disjunct distribution. The nominate subspecies is found in western Mexico from Sonora south to Oaxaca. Subspecies M. o. insularis is found on the Tres Marias Islands off the coast of Nayarit. M. o. oberhoseri is found from Nuevo León in northeastern Mexico south to Oaxaca, in Chiapas, and in several discrete ranges in southern Guatemala, El Salvador, and southwestern Honduras.

The species has two records in Cochise County in the U.S. state of Arizona that are believed to be of the same individual. It was photographed on July 16, 2009 and then photographed and audio recorded a few miles away between July 18 and August 1, 2009. The species was added to the Checklist of North American Birds and the American Birding Association's checklist; the latter lists it as a "Code 5," or "incidental," species. Several previous reports of the species in the U.S. had not been accepted due to concern about their origin, as the species is a common cage bird in Mexico.

The brown-backed solitaire inhabits a variety of forest types in the subtropical zone. These include cloud forest and pine-oak, montane evergreen, lowland evergreen, and semi-deciduous forests. Overall it ranges in elevation from about 300 to 3,500 m (1,000 to 11,500 ft). South of Mexico it ranges from 600 to 3,050 m (2,000 to 10,000 ft) but is usually found above 1,450 m (4,800 ft).

== Behavior ==
=== Movement ===
The brown-backed solitaire is mostly a year-round resident. However, in winter it moves to low elevation in western Mexico and does the same in Sonora between August and March.

=== Feeding ===
The brown-backed solitaire feeds on fruits, favoring those of Bumelia and Prunus species. One source states that it forages in clearings and up to the forest's middle strata; another says it forages from the mid- to upper level.

=== Breeding ===
The brown-backed solitaire breeds mostly between February and July; its season may stretch to September. It nests on or near the ground, building a cup nest of moss lined with pine needles or entirely of pine needles. The usual clutch is two or three eggs that are brownish- to creamy white ands heavy with reddish brown markings. The incubation period is not known; fledging occurs about 17 days after hatch.

=== Vocalization ===
One description of the brown-backed solitaire's song is "highly ventriloquial, a hesitantly starting, slowly descending sweet whistling, accelerating into [a] squeaky, metallic jangling, jumbled crescendo". Its calls include a "metallic, slightly whining, upslurred wheeu or yeeh" and its alarm call is a "nasal rasping shiehh". Other authors similarly describe the song and call respectively as "a liquid cascading metallic jangling that starts slowly, but finishes in a jumbled crescendo" and "a sharp metallic Scheeet! (as if pulling a sword from its scabbard)".

== Status ==
The IUCN has assessed the brown-backed solitaire as being of Least Concern. It has a very large range; its estimated population of at least 500,000 mature individuals is believed to be decreasing. No immediate threats have been identified. It is considered fairly common to common overall and fairly common south of Mexico.
