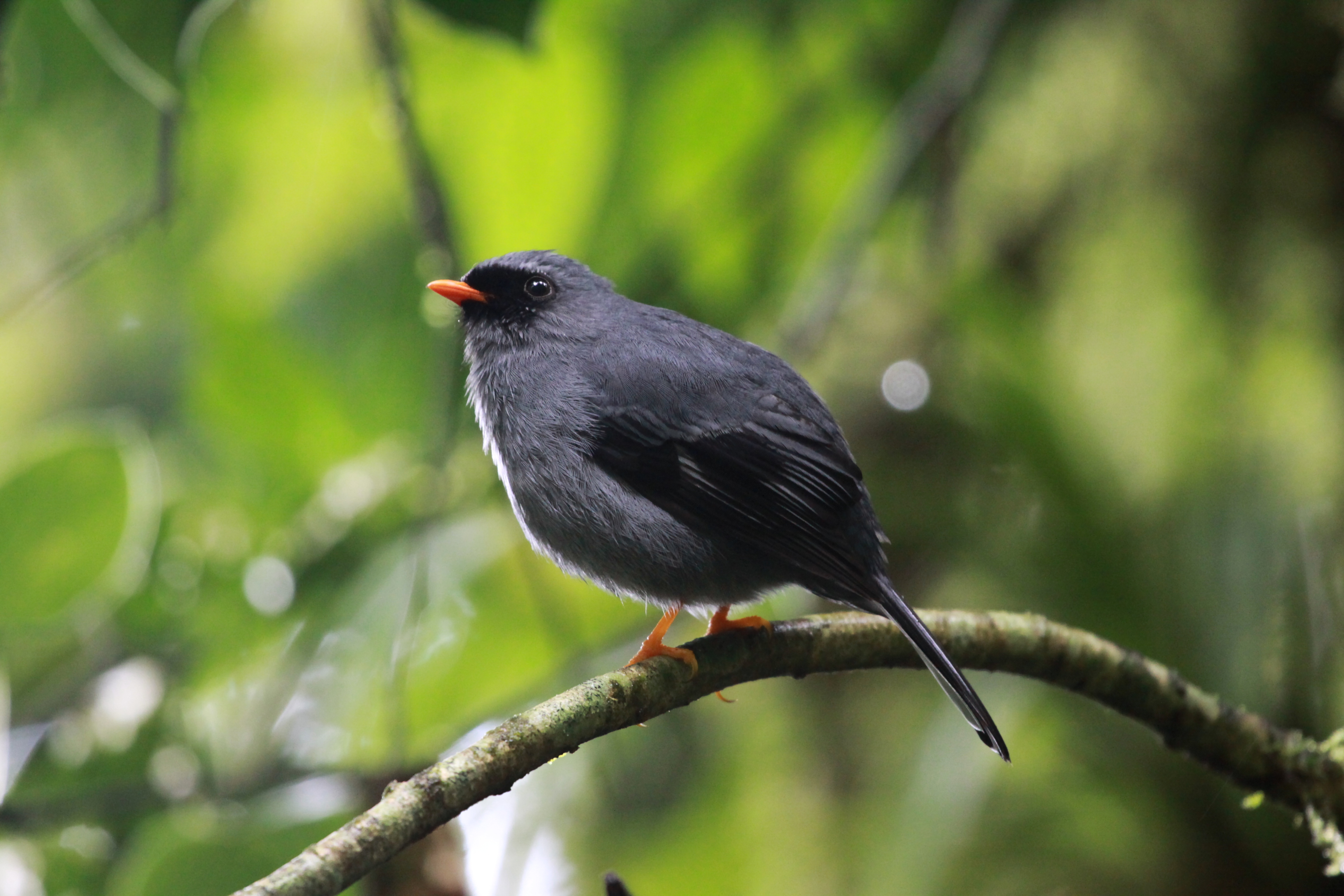

Conservation status
- Least Concern (IUCN 3.1)

Scientific classification
- Kingdom: Animalia
- Phylum: Chordata
- Class: Aves
- Order: Passeriformes
- Family: Turdidae
- Genus: Myadestes
- Species: M. melanops

Binomial name
- Myadestes melanops Salvin, 1865

= Black-faced solitaire =

Species of bird

The black-faced solitaire (Myadestes melanops) is a bird in the thrush family endemic to highlands in Costa Rica and western Panama.

This is a bird of dense undergrowth and bamboo clumps in wet mountain forest, normally from 750 to 3,000 m (2,460 to 9,840 ft) altitude. It disperses as low as 400 m (1,300 ft) in the wet season, when it may form loose flocks. It builds a cup nest of mosses and liverworts in a tree crevice, hole in a mossy bank, or concealed amongst mosses and epiphytes in a tree fork up to 3.5 m (11 ft) above the ground. The female lays two or three rufous-brown marked white or pinkish eggs between April and June. The fledging period is 15–16 days.

The black-faced solitaire is a slim thrush, 16–18.5 cm (6.3–7.3 in) long, and weighing 33 g (1.2 oz) on average. The adult is slate gray with a black face and chin which contrast with the broad orange bill. The wings and tail are slate-edged black, and the underwing coverts are silvery-white, a feature which shows well in flight. The legs are orange. The juvenile has buff streaks on the head and upper parts, and buff and brown mottling on the underparts.

The black-faced solitaire usually forages low in vegetation, mainly for berries, but also insects. It will ascend into the canopy or emerge into trees in pasture in its search for food. The call is a nasal ghank or liquid quirt, and the song is a beautiful fluty whistled teedleedlee…tleedleeee…lee-dah…lee-dah given mainly in the evening from a shady canopy perch. While the extremely slow song is of a wonderfully pure, ethereal color in nature, when held in a cage the sound leads to it commonly being called "squeaky hinge bird".

Black-faced Solitaire (Myadestes melanops)

The black-faced solitaire remains common in protected and inaccessible areas, but trapping of this prized songster for the cage-bird trade has badly affected its numbers elsewhere.

Monteverde, Costa Rica
