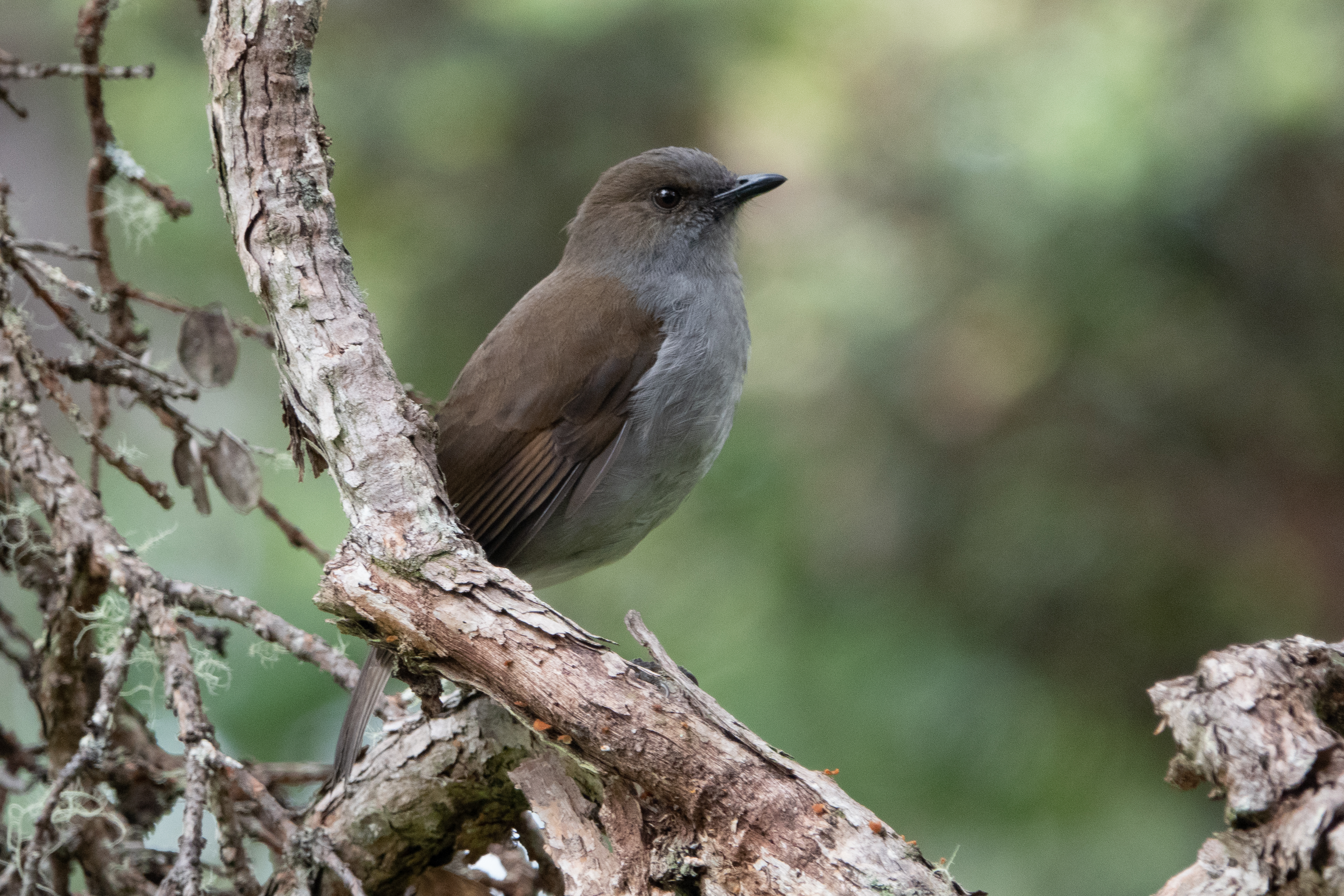

Conservation status
- Near Threatened (IUCN 3.1)

Scientific classification
- Kingdom: Animalia
- Phylum: Chordata
- Class: Aves
- Order: Passeriformes
- Family: Turdidae
- Genus: Myadestes
- Species: M. obscurus

Binomial name
- Myadestes obscurus (J. F. Gmelin, 1789)

= ʻŌmaʻo =

Species of bird

The ʻōmaʻo (Myadestes obscurus), also called the Hawaiian thrush, is an endemic species of robin-like bird found only on the island of Hawaii. ʻŌmaʻo are closely related to the other endemic thrushes of the Hawaiian Islands, the kāmaʻo, the olomaʻo, and the puaiohi. ʻŌmaʻo are found primarily in rainforests in the eastern and southeastern regions of the Big Island. Population estimates approximate 170,000 birds, making it the most common of the Hawaiian thrushes. It appears to have a stable population, but because the entire population exists on a small range and is endemic to a single island, it is considered near threatened.

== Taxonomy ==
The ʻōmaʻo was formally described in 1789 by the German naturalist Johann Friedrich Gmelin in his revised and expanded edition of Carl Linnaeus's Systema Naturae. He placed it with the flycatchers in the genus Muscicapa and coined the binomial name Muscicapa obscura. The specific epithet is from Latin and means "dark" or "dusky". Gmelin based his account on the "Dusky fly-catcher" that had been described in 1783 by the English ornithologist John Latham in his book A General Synopsis of Birds. Latham had examined a specimen from the "Sandwich Islands", now the Hawaiian Islands, that belonged to the Leverian Museum in London. The ʻōmaʻo is now placed in the genus Myadestes that was introduced in 1838 by the English ornithologist William Swainson. The species is monotypic: no subspecies are recognised.

== Description ==
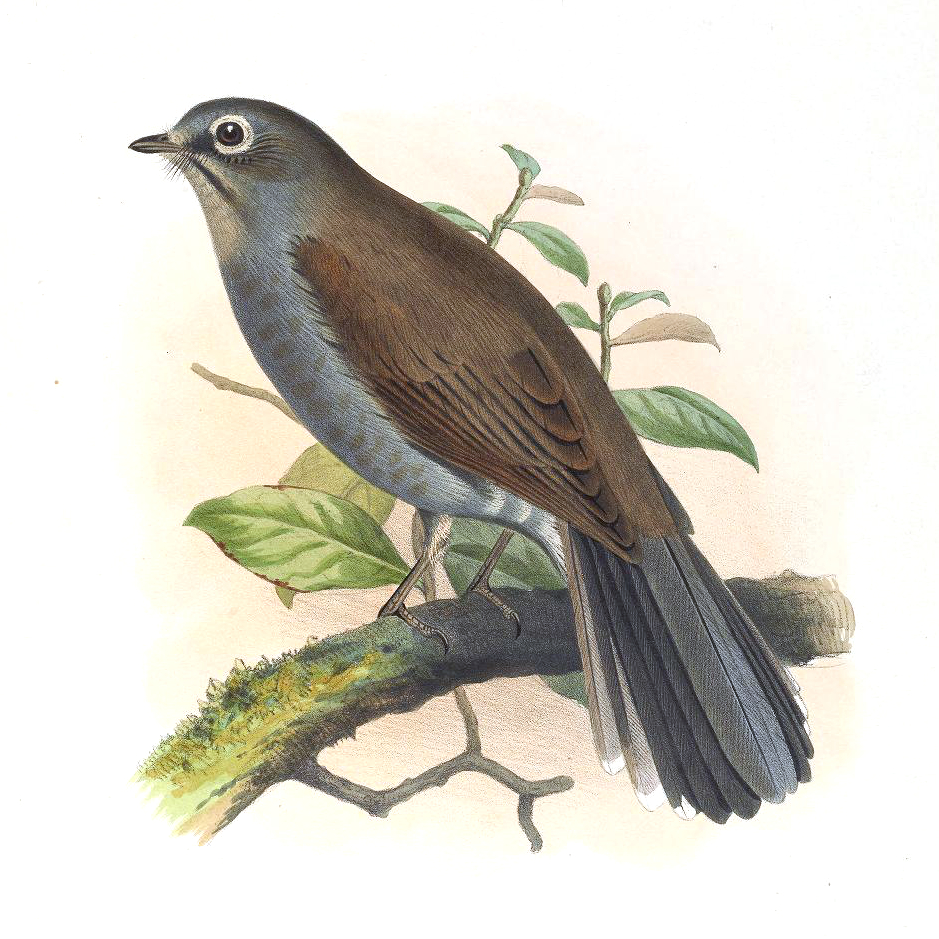
Illustration by Joseph Smit

Adult thrushes (males and females are similar in appearance) are mostly undistinguished, with a grayish-brown head transitioning to a pale gray below. The back and primaries are a dull olive brown. They also have whitish vents and undertail coverts. The juveniles are also similarly dull in coloration, but have pale whitish-buff spotting on the wing coverts.

== Behaviour ==
'Ōma'os are mostly frugivores, but will take insects or other small invertebrates. The bird has a song that is a set of jerky liquid notes, whip-per-weeo-whip-per-weet. Their calls include a catlike rasp, a froglike croak and even a high pitched police whistle type sound. During breeding, the birds make a bulky nest in a tree or tree fern, laying one to three bluish eggs inside.

== Habitat ==
The 'ōma'o once lived on most of the land of Hawaii. Today it is restricted to the southern and eastern slopes of the island, mostly over 1,000 meters above sea level, 25 to 30 percent of its ancestral habitat. Its preferred habitat is rainforest, but can be found in high shrublands on Mauna Loa. Preferred trees include the ohia and koa. The Hawaiian thrush avoids areas with banana poka (an invasive vine). In lower elevations, it appears to be gaining a natural resistance to avian malaria. Threats to this species include habitat destruction from housing and farming; introduced feral animal predation (mainly rats, cats and mongoose); invasive plant encroachment; and feral livestock such as pigs.

The species has been aided by several conservation actions. These include the removal of pigs from several areas in the 1990s, such as Hakalau Forest National Wildlife Refuge.
