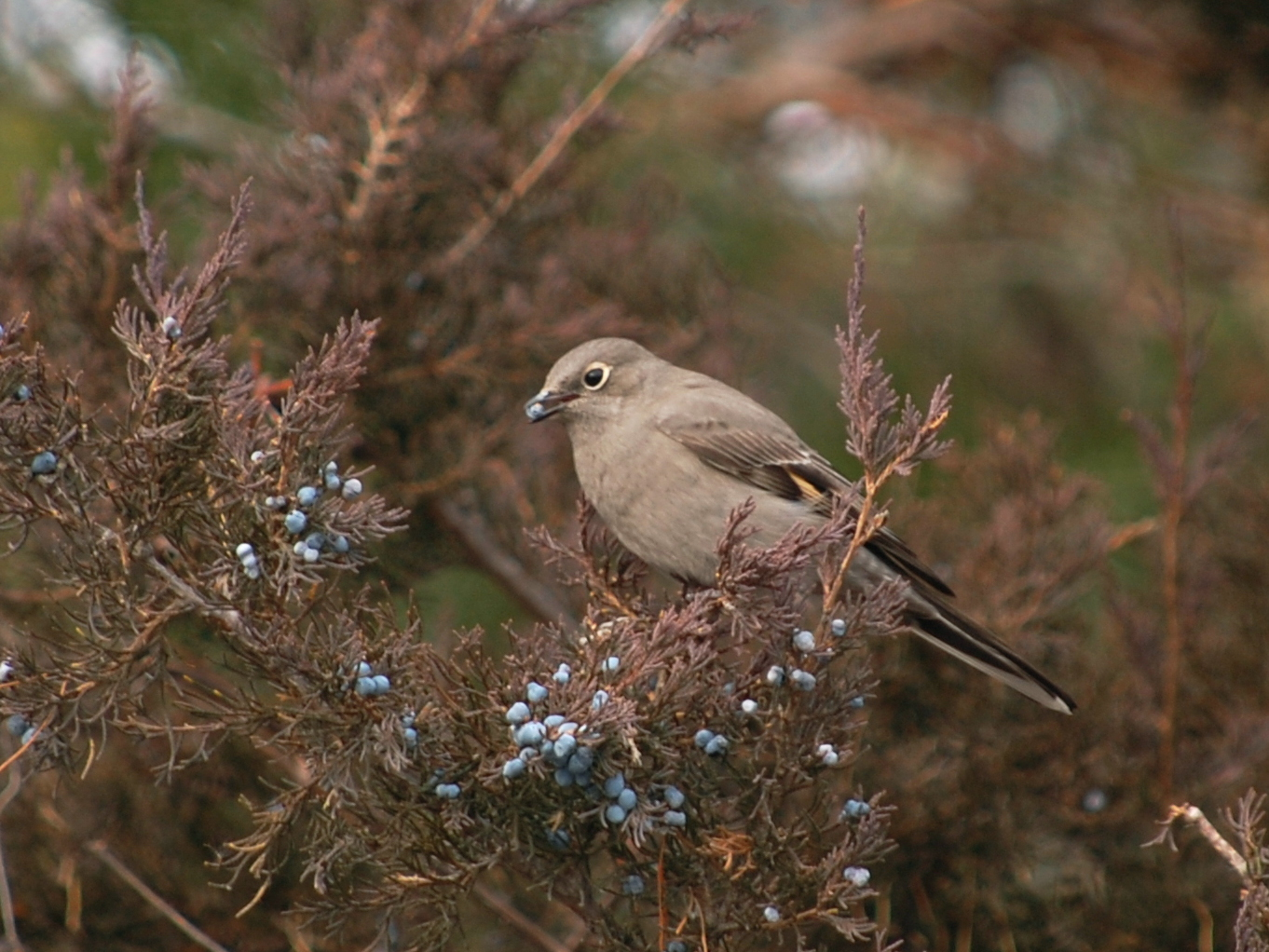
- Townsend's solitaire (Myadestes townsendi)

Scientific classification
- Domain: Eukaryota
- Kingdom: Animalia
- Phylum: Chordata
- Class: Aves
- Order: Passeriformes
- Family: Turdidae
- Subfamily: Myadestinae; S.F. Baird, 1864

Genera
- Grandala; Sialia; Neocossyphus; Stizorhina; Myadestes

= Myadestinae =

Myadestinae Temporal range: Serravallian – Holocene, 11–0 Ma

Subfamily of thrushes

Myadestinae (the turdid solitaires) are a subfamily of passerine birds in the family Turdidae. Members of this group have been noted by ornithologists to be rather unusual in that they lack the typical diagnostic traits seen in the "true" thrushes of the sister subfamily Turdinae. Examples of including the lack syringeal morphology seen in turdines and the feeding ecology of myadestines being similar to those of Old World flycatchers. A 2005 molecular study from Klicka et al. found support in a basal clade consisting of the genera Sialia, Neocossyphus, Stizorhina, and Myadestes to be sister to the rest of the thrushes. The divergence between myadestines and turdines occurred 11 million years ago in the Serravallian.

== Genera ==
Image	Genus	Living species
	Grandala Hodgson, 1843	Grandala, Grandala coelicolor
	Sialia Swainson, 1827	Eastern bluebird, Sialia sialis; Western bluebird, Sialia mexicana; Mountain bluebird, Sialia currucoides
	Neocossyphus Fischer, GA, 1884	White-tailed ant thrush, Neocossyphus poensis (Strickland, 1844); Red-tailed ant thrush, Neocossyphus rufus (Fischer & Reichenow, 1884)
	Stizorhina Oberholser, 1899	Fraser's rufous thrush, Stizorhina fraseri (Strickland, 1844); Finsch's rufous thrush, Stizorhina finschi (Sharpe, 1870)
	Myadestes Swainson, 1838	Brown-backed solitaire, Myadestes occidentalis Stejneger, 1882 – northwest Mexico to Honduras; Slate-colored solitaire, Myadestes unicolor Sclater, PL, 1857 – south Mexico to Nicaragua; Townsend's solitaire, Myadestes townsendi (Audubon, 1838) – west Canada to central Mexico; † Kamao, Myadestes myadestinus (Stejneger, 1887) – Kauai (Hawaiian Islands, extinct); Puaiohi, Myadestes palmeri (Rothschild, 1893) – Kauai (Hawaiian Islands); Olomaʻo, Myadestes lanaiensis (Wilson, SB, 1891) – Hawaiian Islands; ʻŌmaʻo, Myadestes obscurus (Gmelin, JF, 1789) – Hawaii (Hawaiian Islands); Cuban solitaire, Myadestes elisabeth (Lembeye, 1850) – Cuba; Rufous-throated solitaire, Myadestes genibarbis Swainson, 1838 – West Indies; Black-faced solitaire, Myadestes melanops Salvin, 1865 – Costa Rica and Panama; Varied solitaire, Myadestes coloratus Nelson, 1912 – Panama; Andean solitaire, Myadestes ralloides (d'Orbigny, 1840) – north Venezuela to west Bolivia
