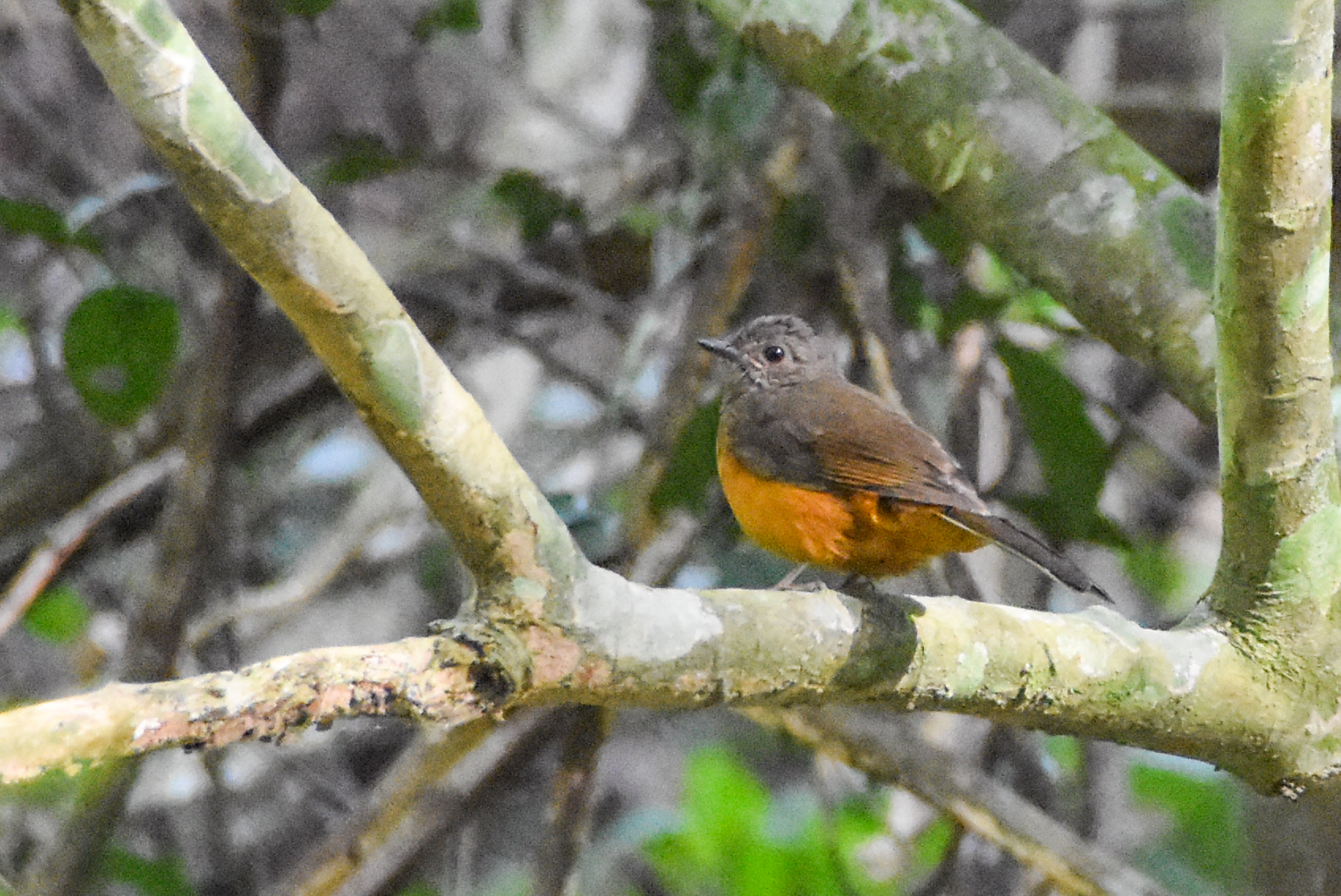

Conservation status
- Least Concern (IUCN 3.1)

Scientific classification
- Kingdom: Animalia
- Phylum: Chordata
- Class: Aves
- Order: Passeriformes
- Family: Turdidae
- Genus: Stizorhina
- Species: S. finschi

Binomial name
- Stizorhina finschi (Sharpe, 1870)

Synonyms
- Neocossyphus finschi

= Finsch's rufous thrush =

Species of bird

Finsch's rufous thrush (Stizorhina finschi), also known as Finsch's flycatcher-thrush, Finsch's rusty flycatcher, Finsch's ant thrush or Finsch's rufous ant thrush, is a little-known flycatcher-like thrush of West African forests. It is often considered a subspecies of Fraser's rufous thrush.

== Range and habitat ==
This species lives at low levels in the thickest parts of forests, often near streams or damp areas or in wooded swamps, from sea level to 1500 meters (about 5,000 ft), in the southern parts of Sierra Leone, Liberia, Ghana, Benin, and Nigeria. (A record from southern Togo may represent a small population there.) It is sedentary (does not migrate).

It is rare in many areas, but common in some.

== Description ==
Finsch's flycatcher-thrushes are 18 to 20 cm (7.1 to 7.9 in) long. Adults are brown above and orangish below, more gray or olive on the nape and breast and more rufous at the rear of the body. The tail is dark brown with white corners. The cheeks and throat are pale with gray and orange tints. Immatures are undescribed.

The voice is similar to that of the rufous flycatcher-thrush. In Liberia it sings from May to October. The song is four melodious whistles, "hooee, hooee hooee-huEE, slower and lower-pitched than song of Rufous Flycatcher Thrush". One call is four rapidly repeated notes, "tswe-tswe-tswe-tswe" with the variant "tsw-tsee… tsweeeee"; another is "a long, plaintive whistle wee… weeeee-eee." In alarm caused by predators it gives a "buzzing word-word-word." Unlike the rufous flycatcher-thrush, this species responds to recordings of its call.

== Behavior ==
Finsch's flycatcher-thrush usually occurs alone or in pairs. During the breeding season it is highly territorial, but at other times it may join mixed-species flocks at ant swarms. However, it relies much less on ant swarms than two of its fellow members of the genus Neocossyphus, the white-tailed and red-tailed ant thrushes. Instead it catches insects in its beak like a flycatcher, hawking from perches or taking them from under leaves while it hovers. Favored insects include termites, grasshoppers, ants, beetles, flies, and various small species. It may sit for a long time without moving on a horizontal perch. It often flicks its outer rectrices to the side "in scissor-like fashion".

In Nigeria, a bird was seen in March collecting nesting material at the base of an epiphyte. In Liberia, birds have been observed in breeding condition from June to December and independent young in September. Little else is known about this species' reproduction.

== Taxonomy ==
Some authorities lump this species with Fraser's rufous thrush, partly because of observations of birds in southern Nigeria with plumage and songs between those of the two species. Here it is treated as a separate species following the Handbook of the Birds of the World and other authorities.

The specific epithet honors the explorer Otto Finsch. It is often spelled finschii, but the spelling with one i is correct.
