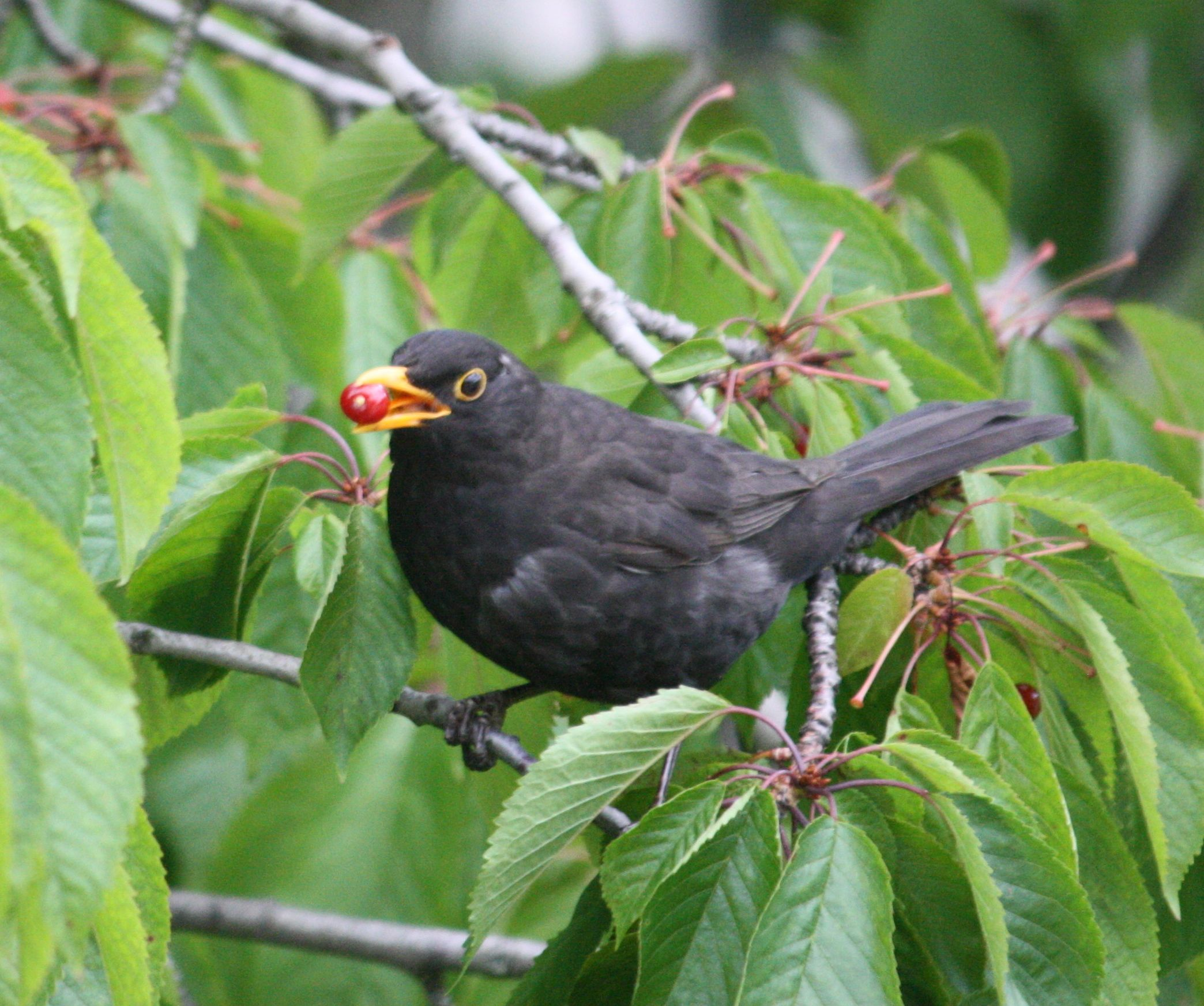
- Common blackbird (Turdus merula)

Scientific classification
- Kingdom: Animalia
- Phylum: Chordata
- Class: Aves
- Order: Passeriformes
- Family: Turdidae
- Subfamily: Turdinae; Rafinesque, 1815

Genera
- Zoothera; Ixoreus; Ridgwayia; Cichlopsis; Entomodestes; Hylocichla; Catharus; Chlamydochaera; Cochoa; Turdus; Geokichla

= Turdinae =

Turdinae Temporal range: Serravallian – Holocene, 11–0 Ma

Subfamily of thrushes

Turdinae (the turdine thrushes) are a subfamily of passerine birds in the family Turdidae. They are the sister clade to the subfamily Myadestinae. The divergence between myadestines and turdines occurred 11 million years ago in the Serravallian. Within the turdines they can split into three subgroups: Zoothera occupying a basal position, the second consisting of forest thrush genera (Ixoreus, Ridgwayia, Cichlopsis, Entomodestes, Hylocichla, and Catharus) and the remaining group closer to Turdus (Chlamydochaera, Cochoa, Geokichla, and Turdus).
