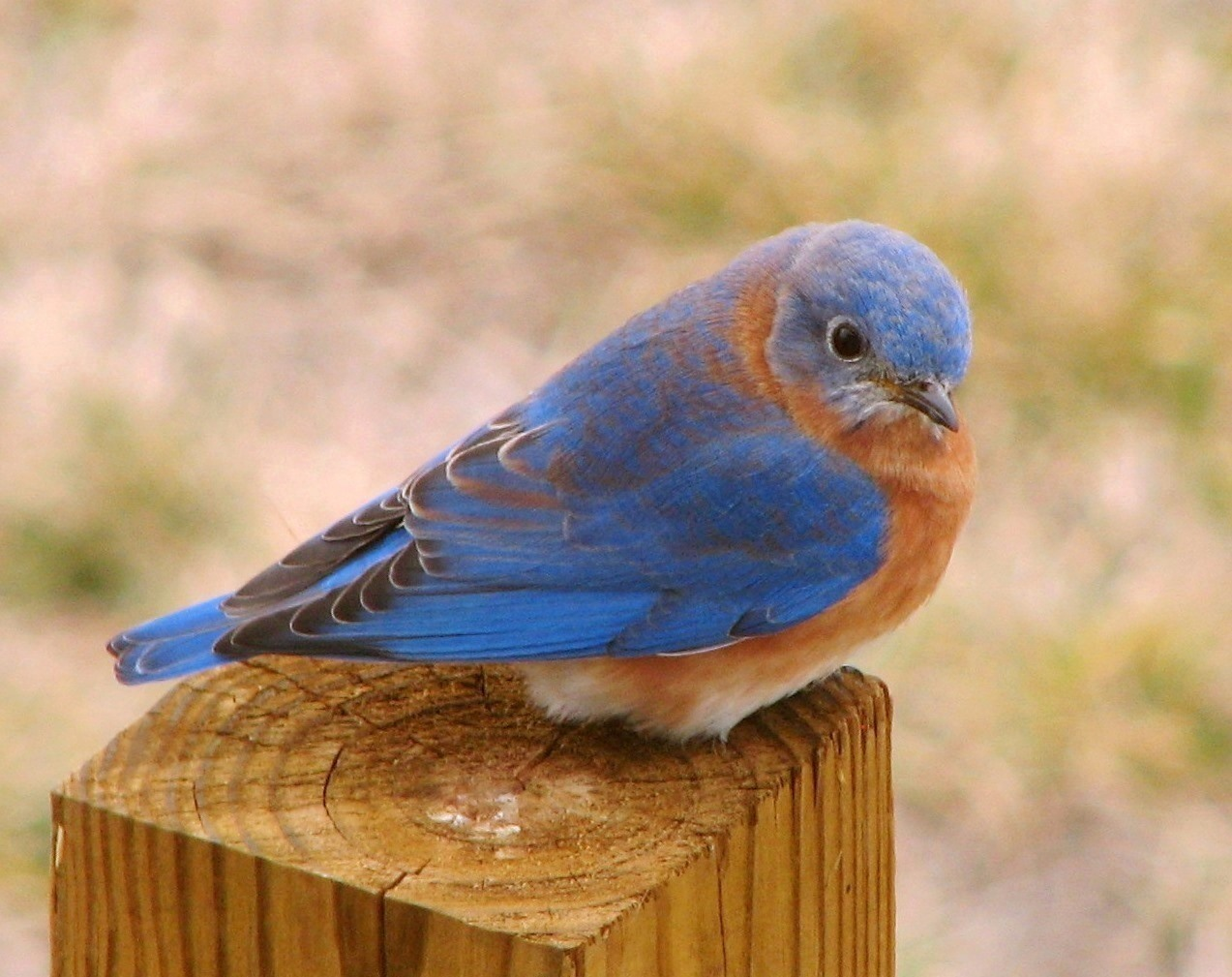
- A male Eastern bluebird in Texas

Scientific classification
- Kingdom: Animalia
- Phylum: Chordata
- Class: Aves
- Order: Passeriformes
- Family: Turdidae
- Subfamily: Myadestinae
- Genus: Sialia; Swainson, 1827

Type species
- Motacilla sialis Linnaeus, 1758

Species
- Mountain bluebird S. currucoides; Western bluebird S. mexicana; Eastern bluebird S. sialis

= Bluebird =

Bluebirds

Genus of birds

The bluebirds are a North American group of medium-sized, mostly insectivorous or omnivorous passerine birds in the genus Sialia of the thrush family (Turdidae).

Bluebirds lay an average of 4 to 6 eggs per clutch. They will usually brood two or three times in a year. Bluebirds nest from March all the way through August.

Bluebirds have blue, or blue and rose beige, plumage. Female birds are less brightly colored than males, although color patterns are similar and there is no noticeable difference in size.

== Taxonomy and species ==
The genus Sialia was introduced by the English naturalist William Swainson in 1827 with the eastern bluebird (Sialia sialis) as the type species. A molecular phylogenetic study using mitochondrial sequences published in 2005 found that Sialia, Myadestes (solitaires) and Neocossyphus (African ant-thrushes) formed a basal clade in the family Turdidae. Within Sialia the mountain bluebird was sister to the eastern bluebird.

The genus contains the following three species:

Genus Sialia – Swainson, 1827 – three species
| Common name | Scientific name and subspecies | Range | Size and ecology | IUCN status and estimated population |
|---|---|---|---|---|
| Mountain bluebird Male Female | Sialia currucoides (Bechstein, 1798) | Western North America | Size: 15.5–18 cm (6.1–7.1 in) Habitat: ubiquitous in mountain environments, but also in open country Diet: various arthropods in summer and a variety of fruit in winter | LC |
| Western bluebird Male Female | Sialia mexicana (Swainson, 1832) Six subspecies: S. m. occidentalis Townsend, JK, 1837; S. m. bairdi Ridgway, 1894; S. m. jacoti Phillips, AR, 1991; S. m. amabilis Moore, RT, 1939; S. m. nelsoni Phillips, AR, 1991; S. m. mexicana Swainson, 1832 | California, the southern Rocky Mountains, Arizona, and New Mexico in the United States, and as far south as the states of Oaxaca and Veracruz in Mexico | Size: 15–18 cm (5.9–7.1 in) Habitat: light woodland, but has adapted to coniferous forests, farmlands, semi-open terrain, and desert Diet: omnivorous, including aerial and terrestrial insects | LC |
| Eastern bluebird Male Female | Sialia sialis (Linnaeus, 1758) Seven subspecies: S. s. sialis (Linnaeus, 1758); S. s. bermudensis Verrill, AH, 1901; S. s. nidificans Phillips, AR, 1991; S. s. fulva Brewster, 1885; S. s. guatemalae Ridgway, 1882; S. s. meridionalis Dickey & Van Rossem, 1930; S. s. caribaea Howell, TR, 1965 | East-central southern Canada to the US Gulf states, and southeastern Arizona to Nicaragua | Size: 16–21 cm (6.3–8.3 in) Habitat: open country around trees, with little understory and sparse ground cover, expanded range to human-altered habitats Diet: mainly insects and other invertebrates, but also fruit and berries | LC |

== Behavior ==
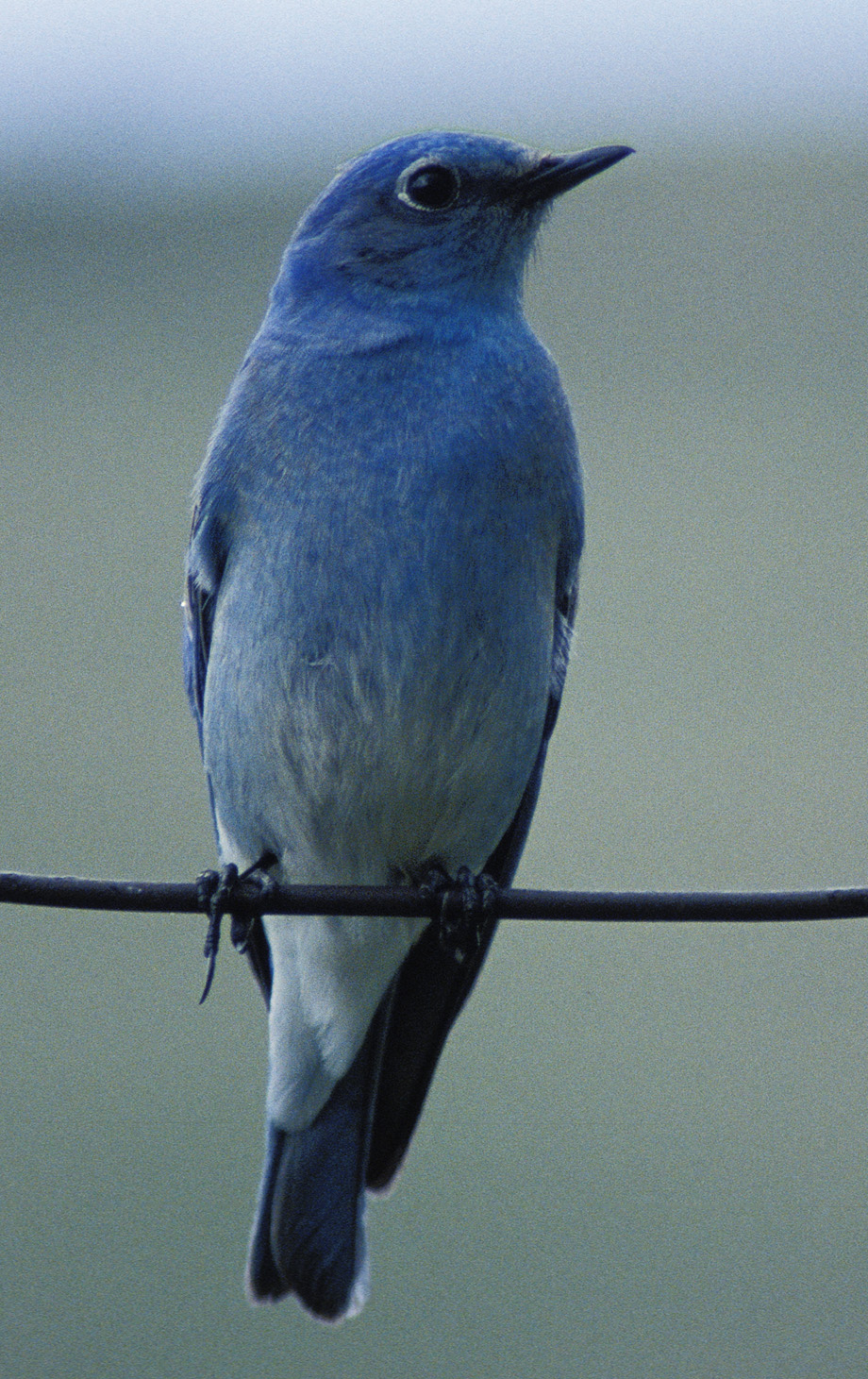
Mountain bluebird

Bluebirds are territorial and prefer open grassland with scattered trees. This is similar to the behavior of many species of woodpeckers. Bluebirds can typically produce between two and four broods during the spring and summer (March through August in the Northeastern United States). Males identify potential nest sites and try to attract prospective female mates to those nesting sites with special behaviors that include singing and flapping wings, and then placing some material in a nesting box or cavity. If the female accepts the male and the nesting site, she alone builds the nest and incubates the eggs.

Predators of young bluebirds in the nests can include snakes, cats, and raccoons. Bird species competing with bluebirds for nesting locations include the common starling, American crow, and house sparrow, which take over the nesting sites of bluebirds, killing young, smashing eggs, and probably killing adult bluebirds.

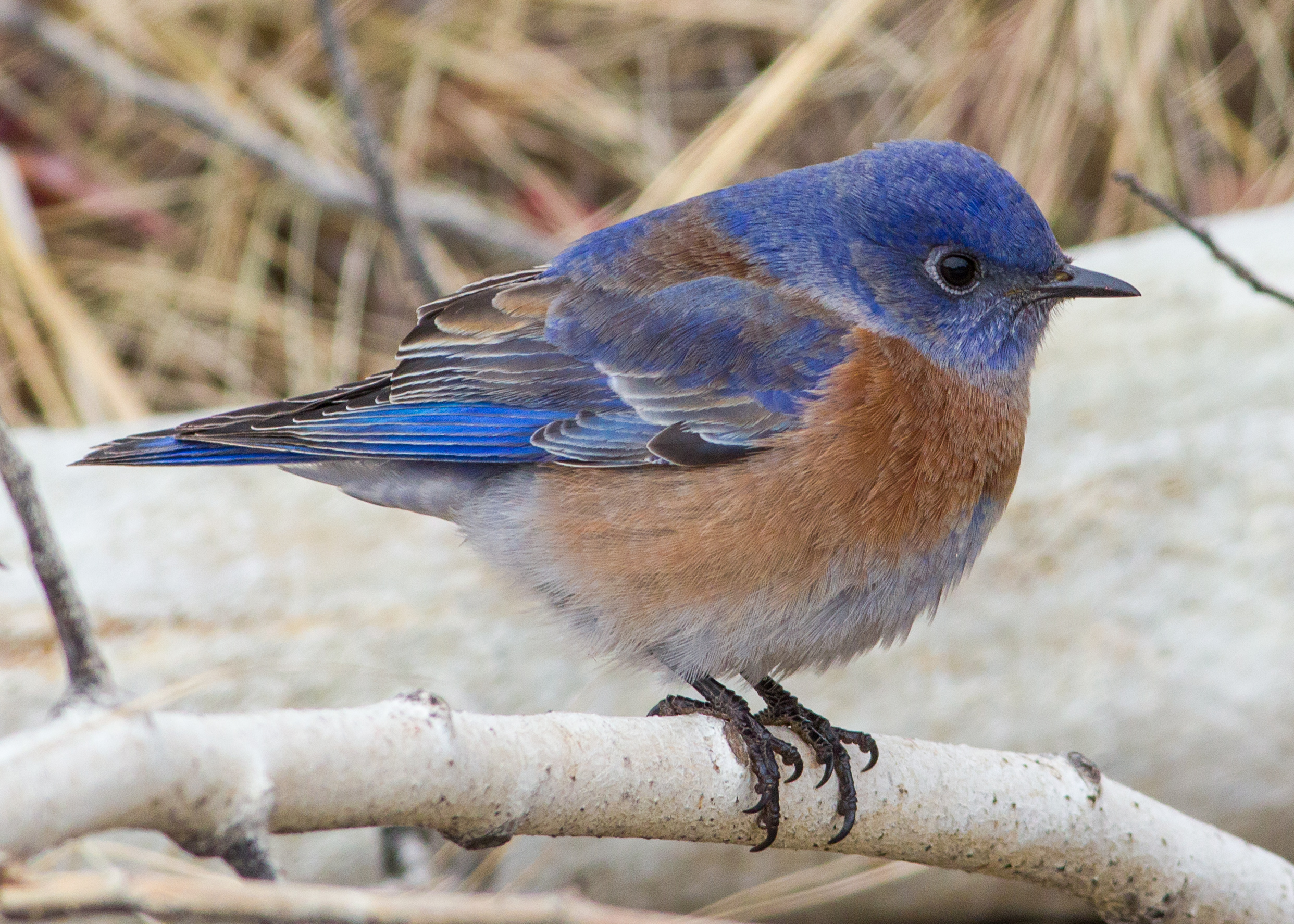
Male western bluebird

Bluebirds are attracted to platform bird feeders, filled with grubs of the darkling beetle, sold by many online bird product wholesalers as mealworms. Bluebirds will also eat raisins soaked in water. In addition, in winter bluebirds use backyard heated birdbaths.

By the 1970s, bluebird numbers had declined by estimates ranging to 70% due to unsuccessful competition with house sparrows and starlings, both introduced species, for nesting cavities, coupled with a decline in habitat. In late 2005, Cornell University's Laboratory of Ornithology reported bluebird sightings across the southern U.S. as part of its yearly Backyard Bird Count, a strong indication of the bluebird's return to the region. This upsurge can be attributed largely to a movement of volunteers establishing and maintaining bluebird trails.

== In the garden ==
Bluebirds' consumption of insects make them popular with gardeners.

== In culture ==
=== Haudenosaunee ===
In traditional Haudenosaunee cosmology, the call of the bluebird (Note: Oneida: talolóhaˀ; Onondaga: jyęhyogeih; Cayuga: jǫ́:nyǫ:ˀ; Seneca: ji:nyóae’) is believed to ward off the icy power of Sawiskera, also referred to as Flint, the spirit of the winter. Its call caused Sawiskera to flee in fear and the ice to recede.

=== As a symbol in songs ===
"Bluebird of Happiness" is a song composed in 1934 by Sandor Harmati, with words by Edward Heyman and additional lyrics by Harry Parr-Davies.

"(There'll Be Bluebirds Over) The White Cliffs of Dover" was composed in 1941 by Walter Kent to lyrics by Nat Burton looking forward to a time when World War II would be over. Burton was unaware that the bluebird was not indigenous to England. Vera Lynn popularised the song with her performances to the troops.

"Bluebird" is a song written by Stephen Stills and recorded by the rock band Buffalo Springfield in 1967. It contains the lyrics "There she sits aloft at perch. Strangest color blue."

== See also ==
- Bluebird of happiness
