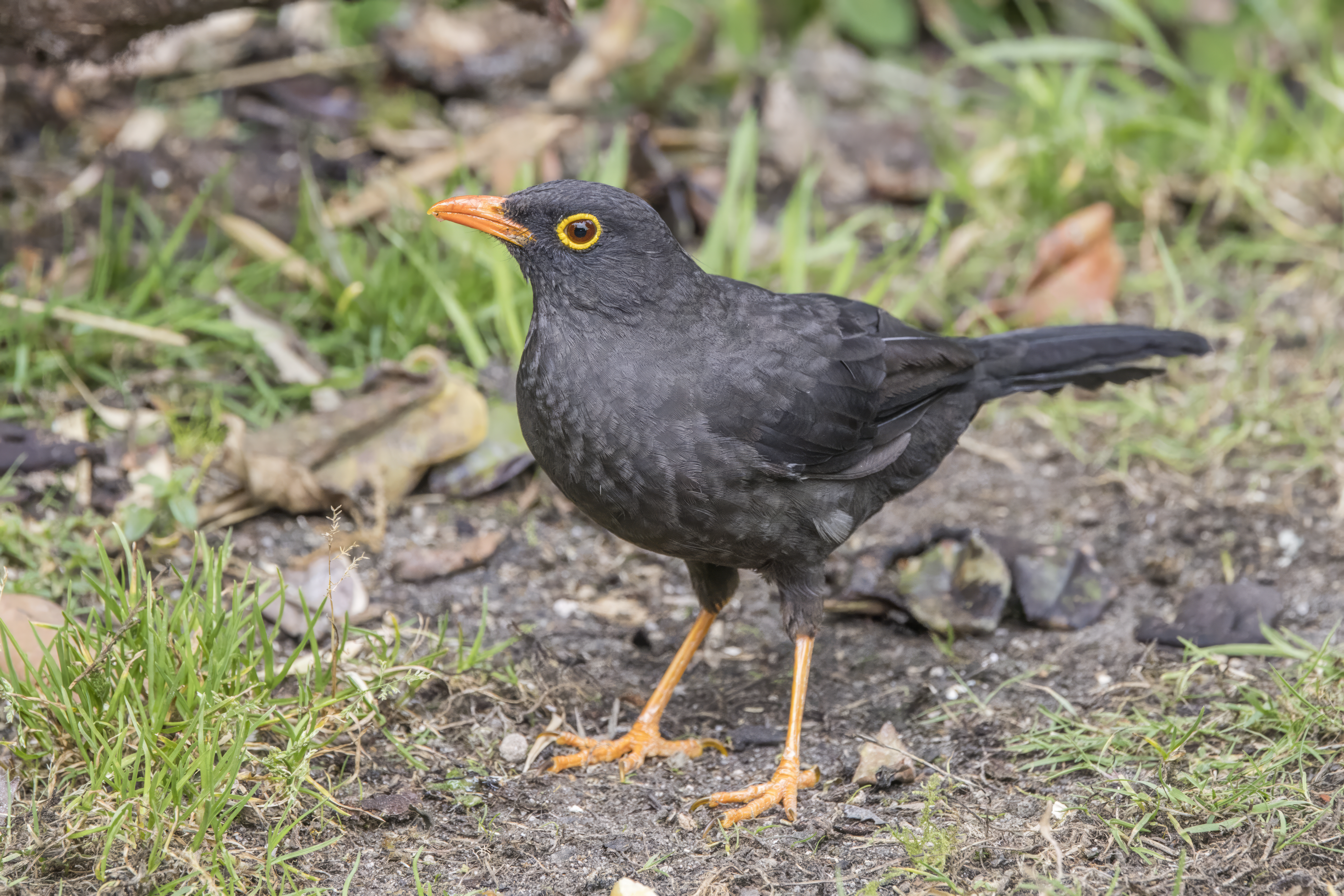
- Male T. f. quindio Manizales, Colombia
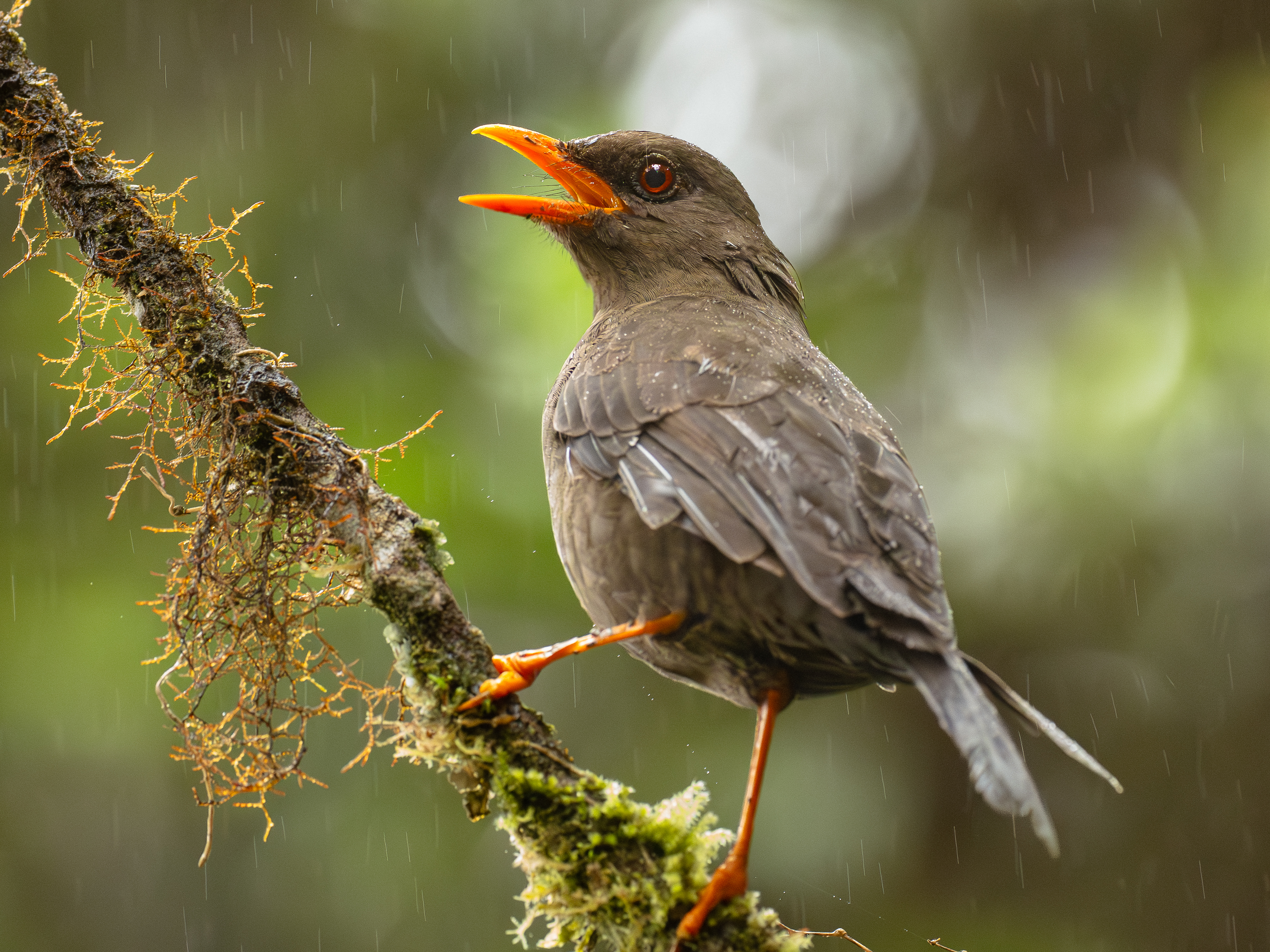
- Female T. f. quindio Bellavista Cloud Forest, Ecuador

Conservation status
- Least Concern (IUCN 3.1)

Scientific classification
- Kingdom: Animalia
- Phylum: Chordata
- Class: Aves
- Order: Passeriformes
- Family: Turdidae
- Genus: Turdus
- Species: T. fuscater

Binomial name
- Turdus fuscater D'Orbigny & Lafresnaye, 1837

= Great thrush =

Species of bird

The great thrush (Turdus fuscater) is a species of bird in the family Turdidae. It is found in Bolivia, Colombia, Ecuador, Peru, and Venezuela. It is considered as the largest thrush in South America. The great thrush's size distinguishes it from the several other uniform slaty-colored thrushes in its range. It inhabits subtropical or tropical moist montane forests and high-altitude shrubland, but can also make use of degraded forest and urban areas.

== Subspecies ==
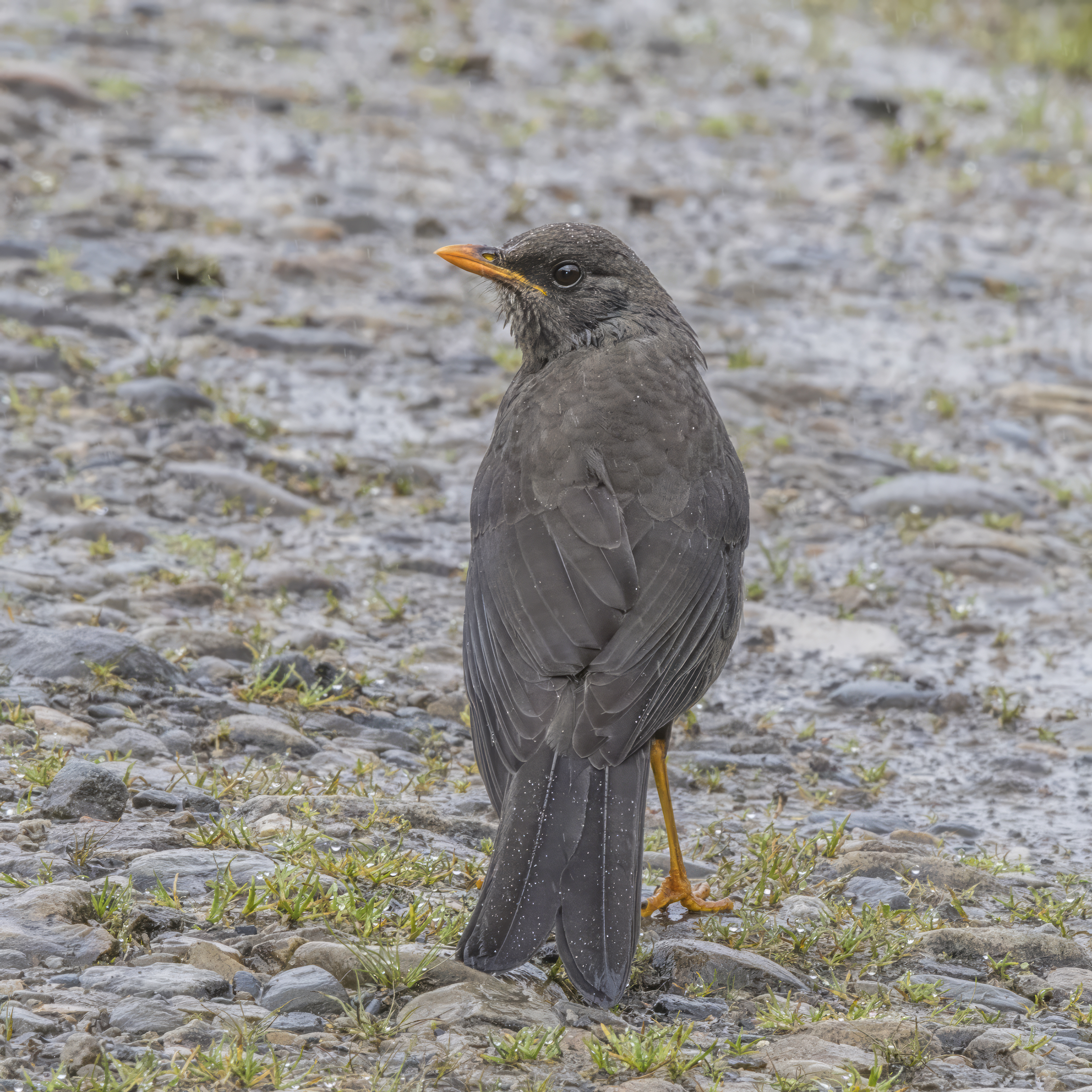
Female T f. gigas, Chingaza National Park, Colombia

Seven subspecies are recognized:

- T. f. fuscater (d´Orbigny, Lafresnaye, 1837). The nominate subspecies can be found in west Bolivia.
- T. f. cacozelus (Bangs, 1898). It can be found in the Santa Marta mountain range in Colombia.
- T. f. clarus (Phelps, Phelps, 1953). Inhabits the frontier between Venezuela and Colombia, in the Sierra del Perijá.
- T. f. quindio (Chapman, 1925). This subspecies is found in south Colombia and the north of Ecuador.
- T. f. gigas (Fraser, 1841). It is native to the Andes mountains of Venezuela and Colombia.
- T. f. gigantodes (Cabanis, 1873). It can be found from south Ecuador to central Peru.
- T. f. ockendeni (Hellmayr, 1906). It can be found in southeast Peru.

== Description ==
Adults are 28 to 33 cm (11 to 13 in) in length and weigh 128 to 175 g (4.5 to 6.2 oz), averaging 141 g (5.0 oz), making the species the largest member of the wide-ranging Turdus genus, and one of the largest thrushes although the Amami thrush may match or exceed it in size. It can be easily identified by its yellowish-orange beak and legs and yellow ring around the eye. Slight sexual dimorphism is sometimes present, with males having more strongly coloured legs and eye rings. Tail feathers are long. The plumage is black-brown, darker on wings and tail and pale on the belly. Juveniles are predominantly greenish gray with a pale belly and some spots of buff colour on the head and wings. Subspecies show subtle differences in colouration, with T. f. ockendeni being the darkest one, followed by T. f. quindio and T .f. gigantodes. The palest subspecies are T. f. gigas, T. f. cacozelus and T. f. fuscater. Albinistic specimens are known to exist but are very rare.

== Distribution and habitat ==
This species is a common one in the Andean highlands. Its range covers the Andes in western and northern Venezuela as far as Lara and Trujillo, the Andes of Colombia, Ecuador, Peru, and finally, northwest Bolivia. It occurs at altitudes of 1800–4000 meters.

The great thrush makes use of a variety of habitats, including open forest, backyards, parks, and even farmland with scattered trees or forest remnants. It also occurs at the edges of different classes of Andean forests, including humid montane, secondary and temperate forests. It is more likely to be found at altitudes above 2000 m. The species tends to avoid dry conditions and densely forested areas, but sometimes occurs on the edges of Andean páramo or in shrublands. It commonly inhabits urban habitats in the highlands, e.g. in Quito and Bogota. Populations are generally sedentary.

== Ecology ==
The great thrush is a generalist feeder, principally foraging for fruits and berries but also taking invertebrates and even stealing eggs and nestlings. It tends to swallow fruits whole. It generally feeds on ground level, preferentially in short grass, but also visits fruiting trees and shrubs. Activity peaks are at dawn and dusk. When flushed, flight distance is usually short.

Adults become very territorial in the breeding season but can form groups of up to 40 individuals at other times of the year. It is probable that these groups form a communal perch in trees until the next breeding season comes.

Breeding occurs at different times of the year depending on locality - March–April in Venezuela, January–August in Colombia, October in Ecuador, and February and June in Peru. The nest is comparatively large and cup-shaped, made of small twigs, leaves, grass, and mud, and placed low in trees or shrubs. The female lays two eggs of pale blue-greenish colour with reddish spots, with an average size of 2 cm.

== Songs and vocalizations ==
The species has a diverse variety of vocalizations. The song is soft and melodious, only performed during the breeding season, just before sunrise. It is characterized by quick and varied musical phrases ending in a very high note. When flushed or surprised, a short "keert" or a series of "kurt-kurt-kurt-kurt" are uttered. The bird can also perform a large and loud "kweep".

== Conservation status ==
The great thrush is common in a variety of habitats throughout its wide range and has been classified as Least Concern by the IUCN. The species readily adapts to anthropogenic disturbances and can make use of urban, deforested or agricultural areas.

== Bibliography ==
- Carrión, Juan Manuel (2002). Aves de Quito, retratos y encuentros. Quito: SIMBIOE
- Clement, Peter; Hathway, Ren; Byers, Clive; Wilezur, Jan (2000). Thrushes. London: A&C Black Publishers
- del Hoyo, Josep; Elliott, Andrew; Cristie, David. eds. (2005). Handbook of the Birds of the World. Vol. 10. Cuckoo-shrikes to Thrushes. Barcelona: Lynx Edicions
- Hilty, Steven; Brown, William; Tudor, Guy (2001). Guía de la Aves de Colombia. Bogota: American Bird Conservancy
- Ridgely, Robert; Greenfield, Paul (2001). The Birds of Ecuador. Field Guide. Ithaca: Cornell University Press
- Ridgely, Robert; Greenfield, Paul (2001). The Birds of Ecuador. Status, Distribution, and Taxonomy. Ithaca: Cornell University Press
- Ridgely, Robert; Tudor, Guy (1989). The Birds of South America. Austin: University of Texas Press
