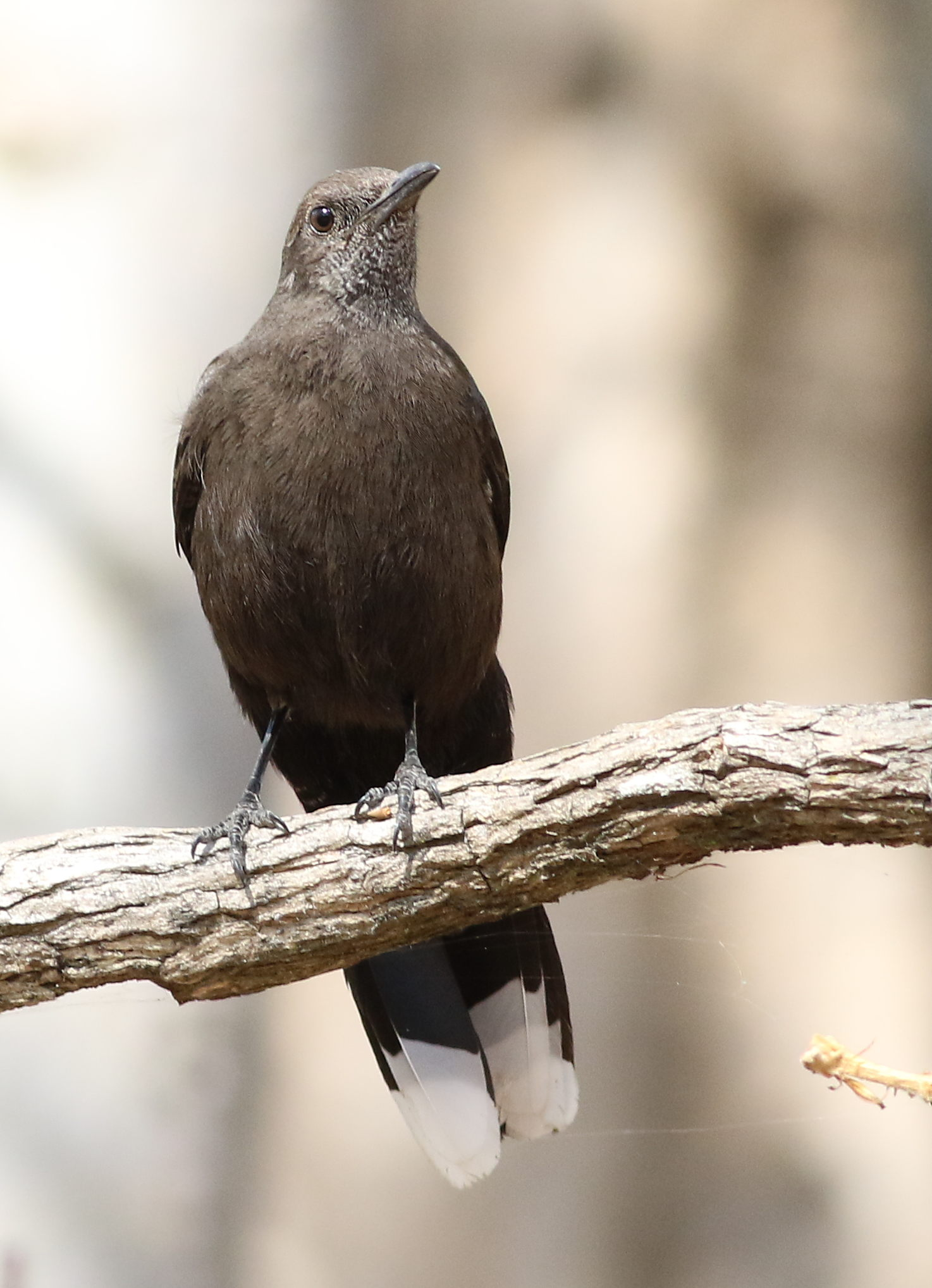
- At Lake Chivero, Harare, Zimbabwe

Conservation status
- Least Concern (IUCN 3.1)

Scientific classification
- Kingdom: Animalia
- Phylum: Chordata
- Class: Aves
- Order: Passeriformes
- Family: Turdidae
- Genus: Pinarornis; Sharpe, 1876
- Species: P. plumosus

Binomial name
- Pinarornis plumosus Sharpe, 1876

= Boulder chat =

Species of bird

The boulder chat (Pinarornis plumosus) is a species of bird in the thrush family Turdidae native to dry woodland and savanna in Southern Africa. It is the only species in the monotypic genus Pinarornis.

== Taxonomy ==
The boulder chat was formally described in 1876 by the English ornithologist Richard Bowdler Sharpe. He introduced a new genus specifically for this species and coined the binomial name Pinarornis plumosus. The genus name combines the Ancient Greek pinaros meaning "dirty" with ornis meaning "bird". The specific epithet plumosus is Latin and means "feathered" or "downy".

Although formerly classified in the family Muscicapidae, a 2020 phylogenetic study, the results of which were followed by the International Ornithological Congress, indicates that Pinarornis is in fact a basal clade within the thrush family Turdidae.

== Description ==
The boulder chat is a large chat, 25 cm (9.8 in) in length, with brownish-black plumage and white tips to the outer tail feathers. In flight, a row of small white spots can be seen on the edge of the primary and secondary coverts. Females are similar to males but have a slightly duller plumage.

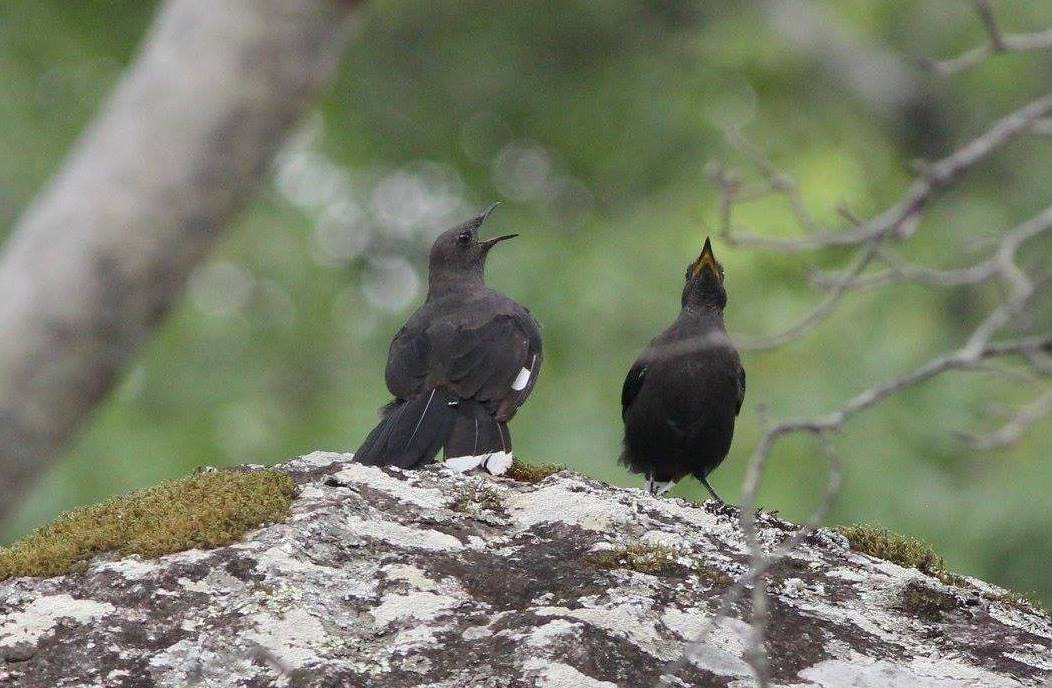
A pair at Lake Mutirikwi, Zimbabwe

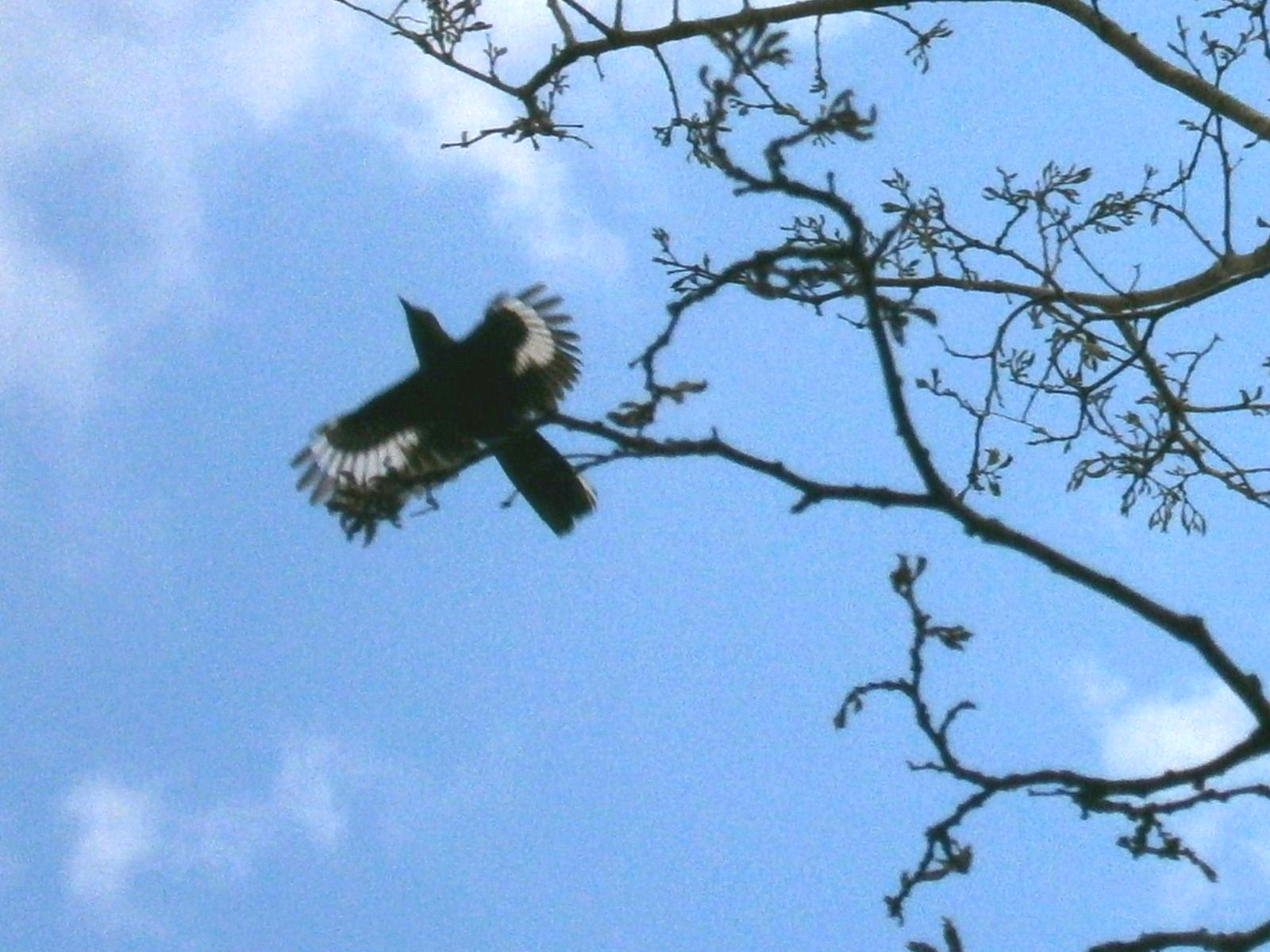
In flight at Dzalanyama, Malawi

== Distribution and habitat ==
The species is native to Southern Africa, including Botswana, Malawi, Mozambique, Zambia, and Zimbabwe. There are distinct populations in the far west of Botswana and southern Zimbabwe; north eastern Zimbabwe, extending into western Mozambique; and a third population in eastern Zambia extending up the Luangwa valley into Malawi. The boulder chat inhabits well-wooded savanna terrain with large granite boulders or scree, usually in woodland areas, especially miombo. This species belongs to a monotypic genus which has no near relatives and it is considered that it evolved on the southern African granite shield, which formation's extent is almost identical to the distribution of the boulder chat.

== Ecology ==
The species is most often seen around large boulders, running and bounding on the ground. It often cocks its tail over its back. Eggs are laid in September to January, with a peak in October and November. After breeding the family remains together as a party until the next breeding season.

== Conservation ==
The IUCN currently classifies the boulder chat as Least Concern. The species may however be under some pressure from habitat loss due to the invasive weed Lantana camara.
