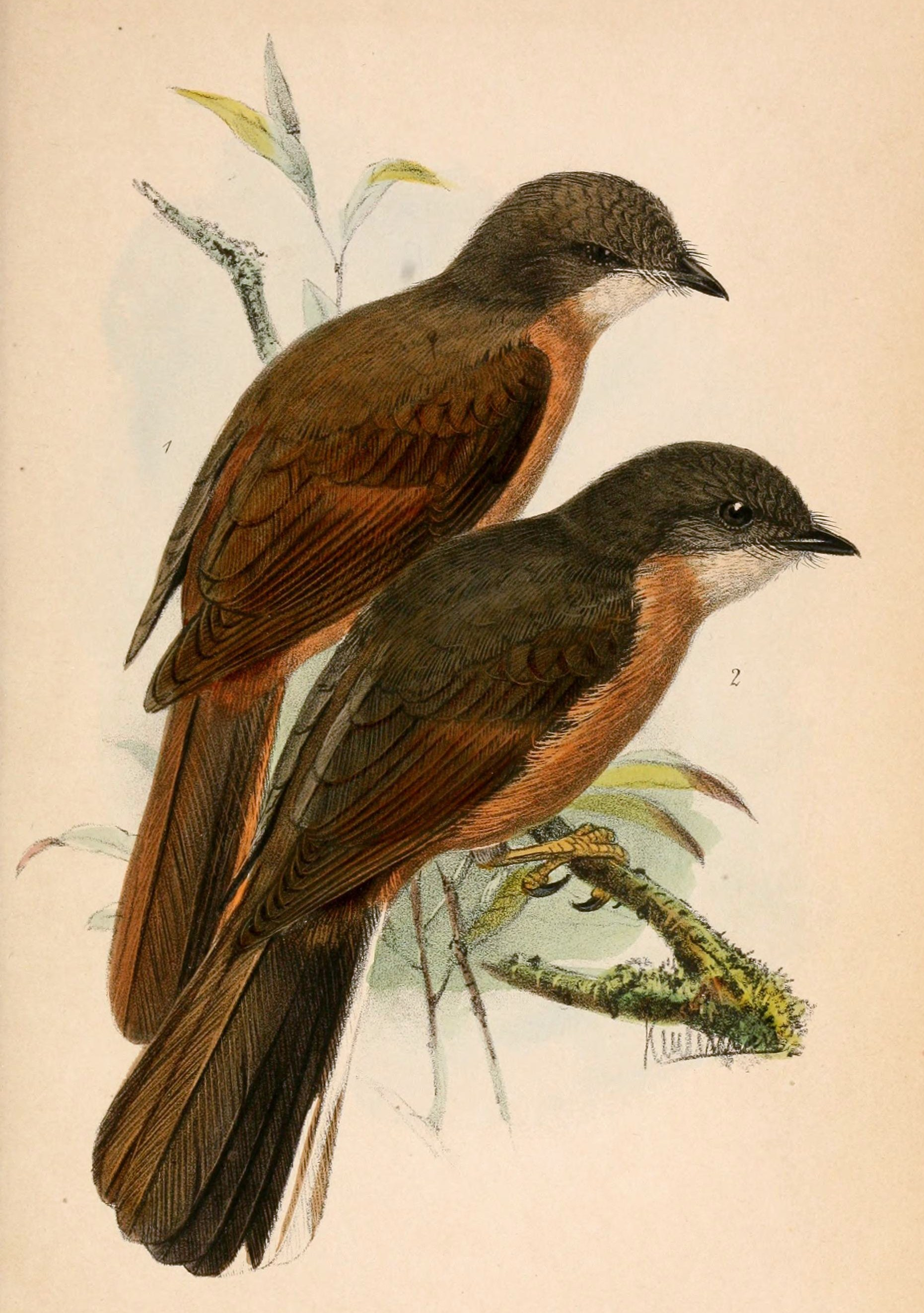
- Finsch's rufous thrush

Scientific classification
- Kingdom: Animalia
- Phylum: Chordata
- Class: Aves
- Order: Passeriformes
- Family: Turdidae
- Subfamily: Myadestinae
- Genus: Stizorhina; Oberholser, 1899

Species
- N. finschii (Sharpe, 1870); N. fraseri (Strickland, 1844)

= Rufous thrush =

Rufous thrushes

Genus of birds

The rufous thrushes, also known as flycatcher-thrushes, are medium-sized insectivorous birds in the genus Stizorhina of the thrush family Turdidae. These are African forest dwelling species. They are sometimes placed in the genus Neocossyphus.

== Species ==
The following two species are currently recognized:

Genus Stizorhina – Oberholser, 1899 – two species
Common name	Scientific name and subspecies	Range	Size and ecology	IUCN status and estimated population
Finsch's rufous thrush	Stizorhina finschi (Sharpe, 1870)	Guinean Forests of West Africa	Size: Habitat: Diet:	LC
Fraser's rufous thrush	Stizorhina fraseri (Strickland, 1844)	Congolian rainforests	Size: Habitat: Diet:	LC
