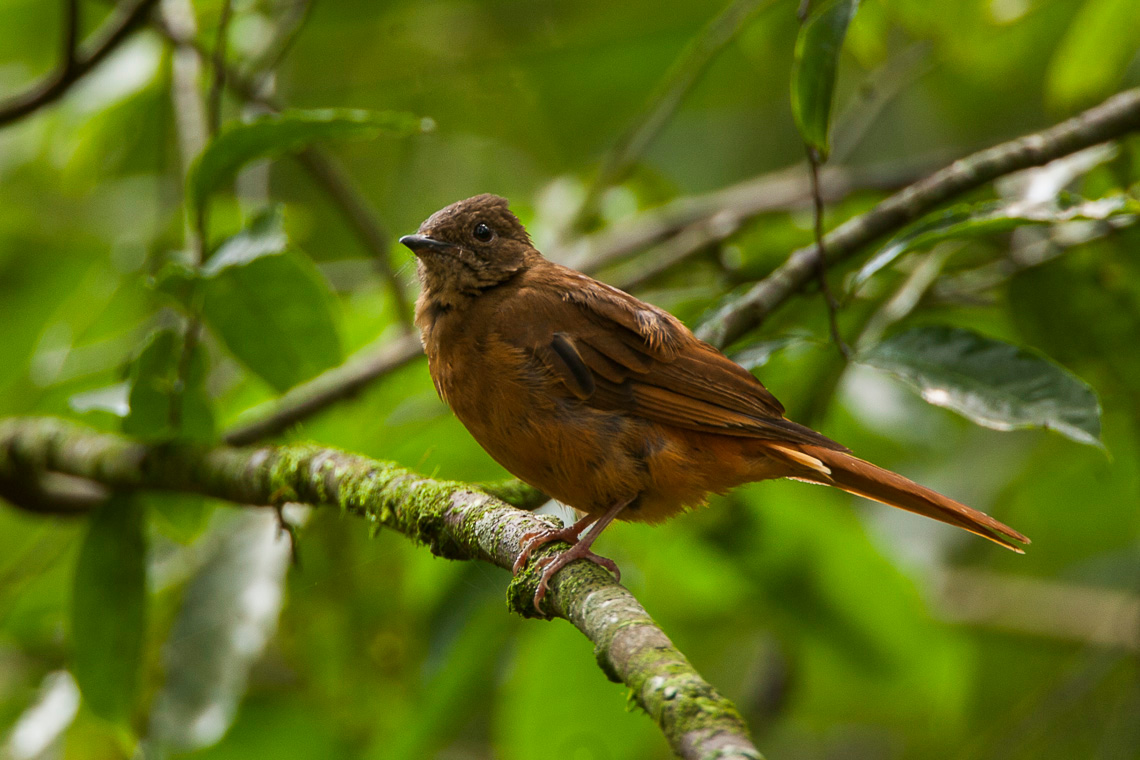

Conservation status
- Least Concern (IUCN 3.1)

Scientific classification
- Kingdom: Animalia
- Phylum: Chordata
- Class: Aves
- Order: Passeriformes
- Family: Turdidae
- Genus: Stizorhina
- Species: S. fraseri

Binomial name
- Stizorhina fraseri (Strickland, 1844)

Synonyms
- Neocossyphus fraseri

= Fraser's rufous thrush =

Species of bird

Fraser's rufous thrush (Stizorhina fraseri), also known as the rufous flycatcher-thrush, is a species of bird in the thrush family.

== Distribution and habitat ==
It is found in easternmost West Africa (Nigeria), widely in Central Africa (Angola, Cameroon, Central African Republic, Republic of the Congo, Democratic Republic of the Congo, Equatorial Guinea, Gabon) and into East Africa (South Sudan, Uganda, and Zambia). Its natural habitat is subtropical or tropical moist lowland forests.
