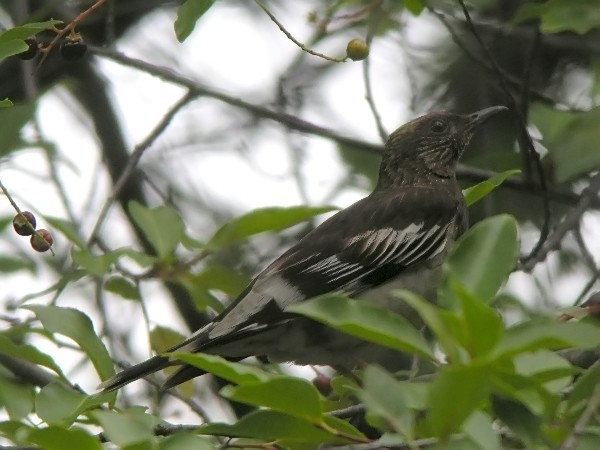
- Digiscoped in Madera Canyon, Arizona

Conservation status
- Least Concern (IUCN 3.1)

Scientific classification
- Kingdom: Animalia
- Phylum: Chordata
- Class: Aves
- Order: Passeriformes
- Family: Turdidae
- Genus: Ridgwayia; Stejneger, 1883
- Species: R. pinicola

Binomial name
- Ridgwayia pinicola (PL Sclater, 1859)

Synonyms
- Turdus pinicola Zoothera pinicola

= Aztec thrush =

Species of bird

The Aztec thrush (Ridgwayia pinicola) is a species of bird in the family Turdidae. It is found mainly in Mexico, but vagrants are occasionally seen in the United States. Its natural habitat is montane forests. The IUCN Red List denotes it as a least-concern species.

== Taxonomy ==
Philip Sclater described the species as Turdus pinicola from southern Mexico in 1859. In 1882, Leonhard Stejneger moved the species into its own genus, Ridgwayia. The genus name honors ornithologist Robert Ridgway. It is also placed in the genus Zoothera. Two subspecies are recognized: R. p. maternalis found in the southwestern United States and northwestern Mexico, and R. p. pinicola in southwestern Mexico.

== Description ==
The Aztec thrush is 21.5–24 cm (8.5–9.4 in) long and weighs 67–88 grams (2.4–3.1 oz). The adult male has a dark brown hood, the head, neck and upper mantle being dark brown, with pale flecks or streaks. There may be a pale brown supercilium. The back, scapulars, median coverts and greater coverts are dark brown, the greater coverts having white edges. The primary coverts are black, with grey tips. The flight feathers are black, with some white patches. The lesser and median coverts of the underwing are white, and the greater coverts are blackish grey. The tail is black or blackish brown, with whitish grey tips. The breast is dark brown, and the rest of the underparts is white. The beak is dark brown, and the legs are pale pink. The female does not have a hood, is paler, and has larger streaks. The juvenile bird is blackish, with golden-buff marks on its head and back. It has a cinnamon or reddish-brown lower back, a black tail and scaled underparts.

== Distribution and habitat ==
The species is found in Mexico, in mountains 1,800–3,500 m (5,900–11,500 ft) above sea level. Its habitat is mostly ravines of pine and pine-oak forests. The Aztec thrush is a vagrant in western Texas to southeastern Arizona. The first record in the United States was an immature bird observed in 1977 in Big Bend National Park, Texas.

== Behaviour ==
This bird usually associates in small groups, sometimes joining mixed-species foraging flocks. It forages in dense vegetation on the ground and eats berries and insects. It has been observed cocking its head while feeding. Its calls include wheeerr, prreep, whein and sweee-uh, and its song is the call repeated and mixed with some other sounds. In the southern part of its range, breeding takes place from May to June. The nest is cup-shaped and made of grass and moss. The eggs are pale blue.

== Status ==
The R. pinicola population is estimated to be less than 50,000 individuals. The population trend is probably declining because of habitat loss. The decline does not appear rapid enough to meet the criteria for vulnerable status, and the range size and population size are both above the threshold for vulnerable status, so the IUCN Red List has assessed the species to be of least concern.
