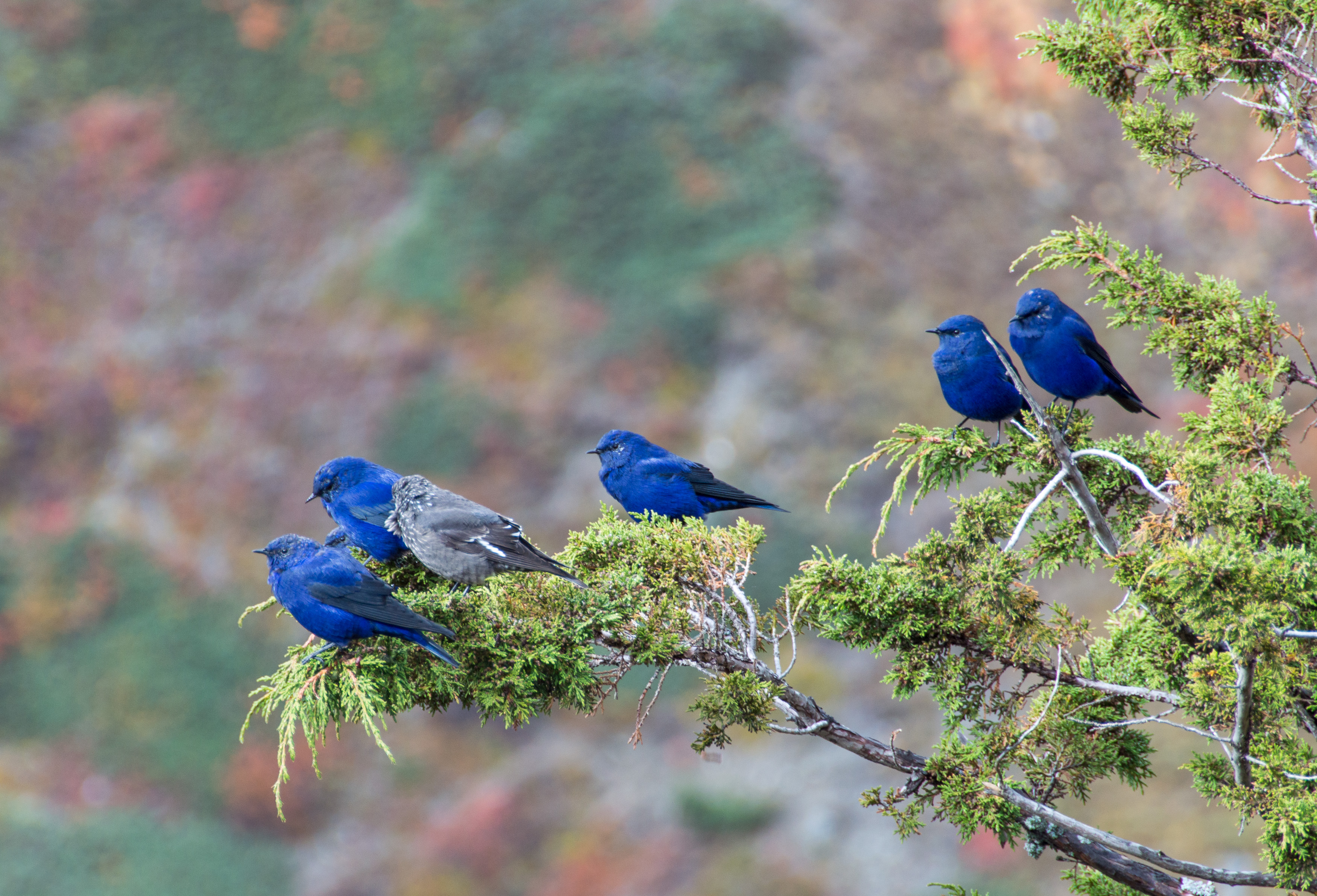
- Grandalas in Nepal

Conservation status
- Least Concern (IUCN 3.1)

Scientific classification
- Kingdom: Animalia
- Phylum: Chordata
- Class: Aves
- Order: Passeriformes
- Family: Turdidae
- Genus: Grandala; Hodgson, 1843
- Species: G. coelicolor

Binomial name
- Grandala coelicolor Hodgson, 1843

= Grandala =

Genus of birds

The grandala (Grandala coelicolor) is a species of bird in the thrush family Turdidae. It is the only species in the genus Grandala. It is an insectivore and frugivore. It ranges across the northwestern and northeastern Indian subcontinent and northeast to western China, existing primarily at high to very high altitudes in the Himalayas and the Tibetan Plateau. It is found in Bhutan, India, Myanmar, and Nepal, as well as Tibet and other areas of China north to southeast Gansu.

== Description ==
The body length of the grandala is 19-23 cm, and it weighs from 38–52 g. The plumage of the male is intense dark blue, with the tail and wings blacker. The plumage of the female is greyish-brownish with fine white streaks on the underparts; rump greyish-blue; the tip and underside of the wing feathers are white. Birds usually make the sounds "dew-ee" and "dewee". In young birds, the plumage is similar to females, but does not have a bluish tint on the rump and upper tail integuments.

== Behaviour ==
Grandala is a social bird; they feed on insects, and small fruit such as Vaccinium berries.

== Distribution ==
The grandala is a partial altitudinal migrant, breeding in high alpine scrub and meadows at 3,900–5,500 m altitude in summer, and descending to 2,000–4,300 m in winter, when it can be found in orchards. In India it is found in the Himalayas from Kashmir (Kishenganga and Liddar valleys), Himachal Pradesh, Uttarakhand through Nepal, Sikkim, and east to Arunachal Pradesh. Though grandala is a common bird in that region, no scientific studies have been conducted.

== Gallery ==
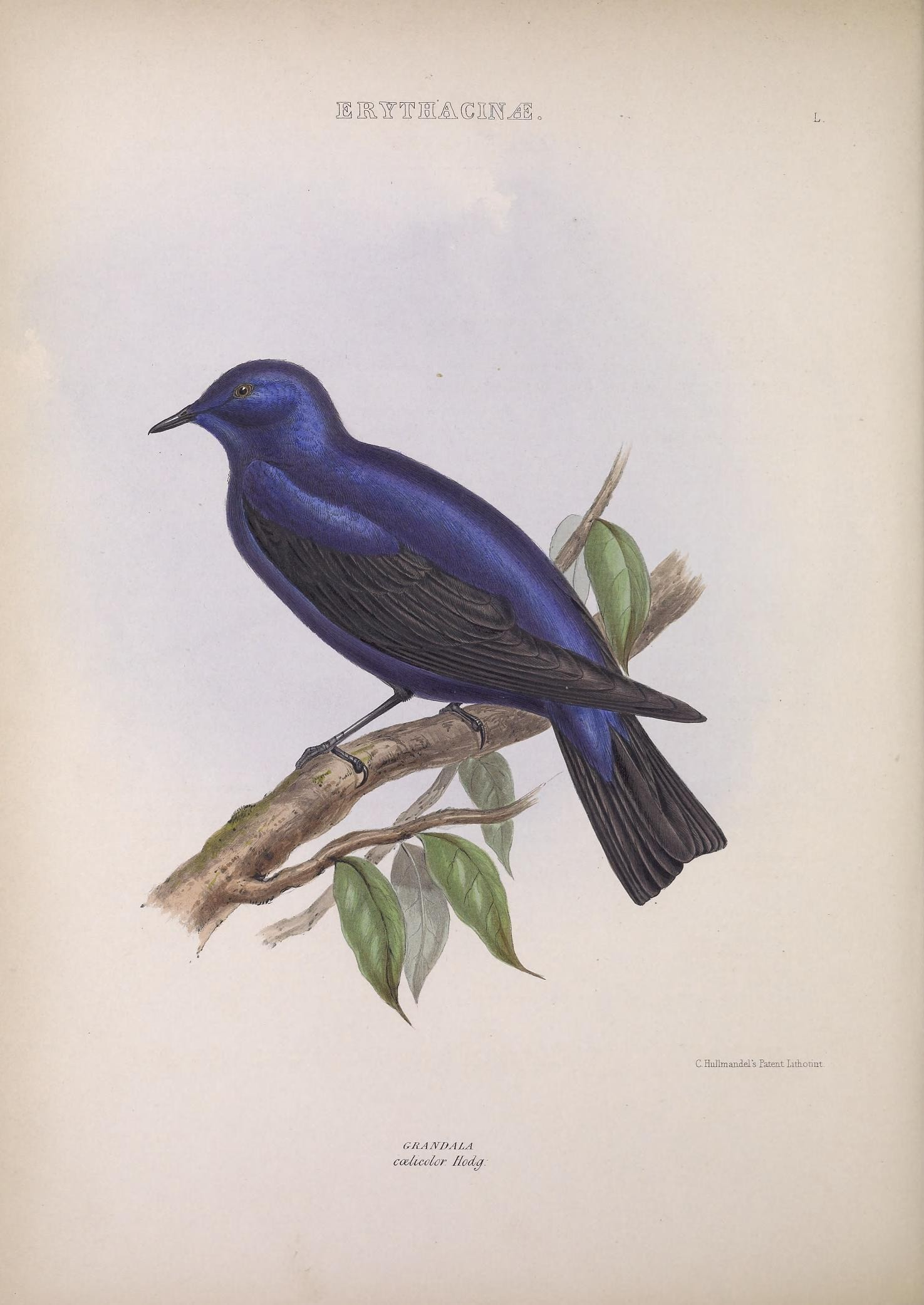
Illustration of male bird from The genera of birds, c. 1849

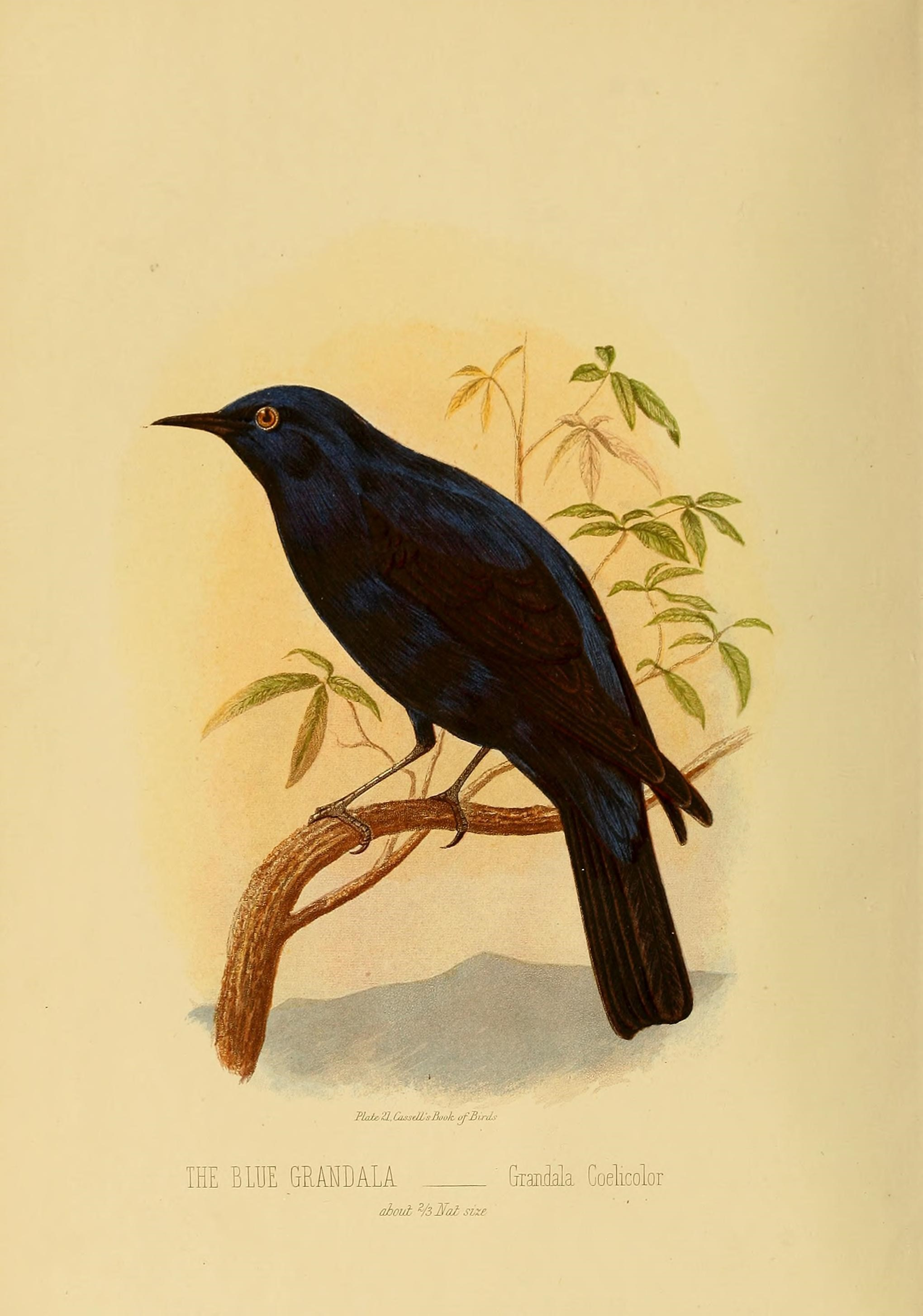
Illustration from Cassell's Book of Birds, c. 1875

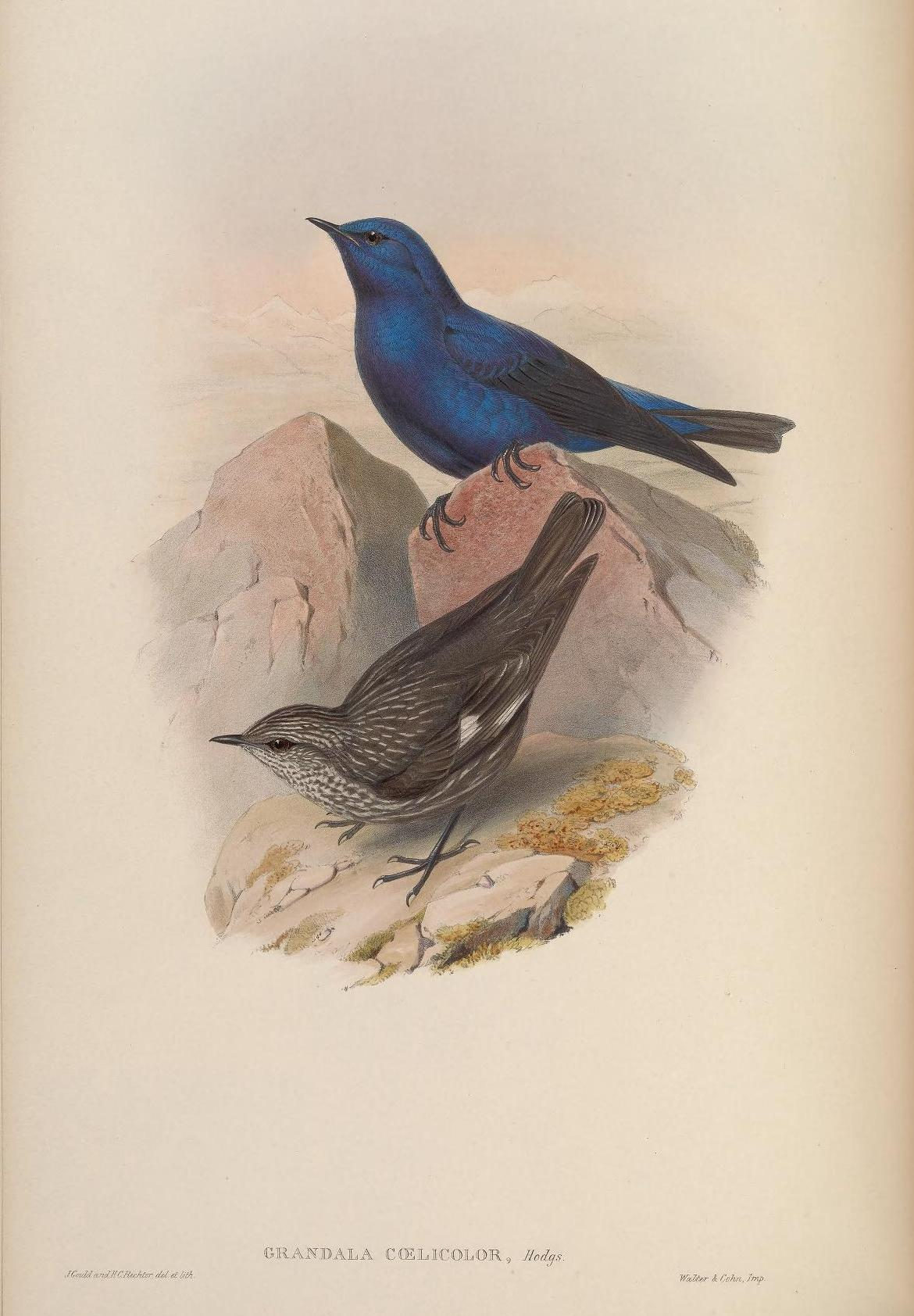
Illustration by John Gould, c. 1850s

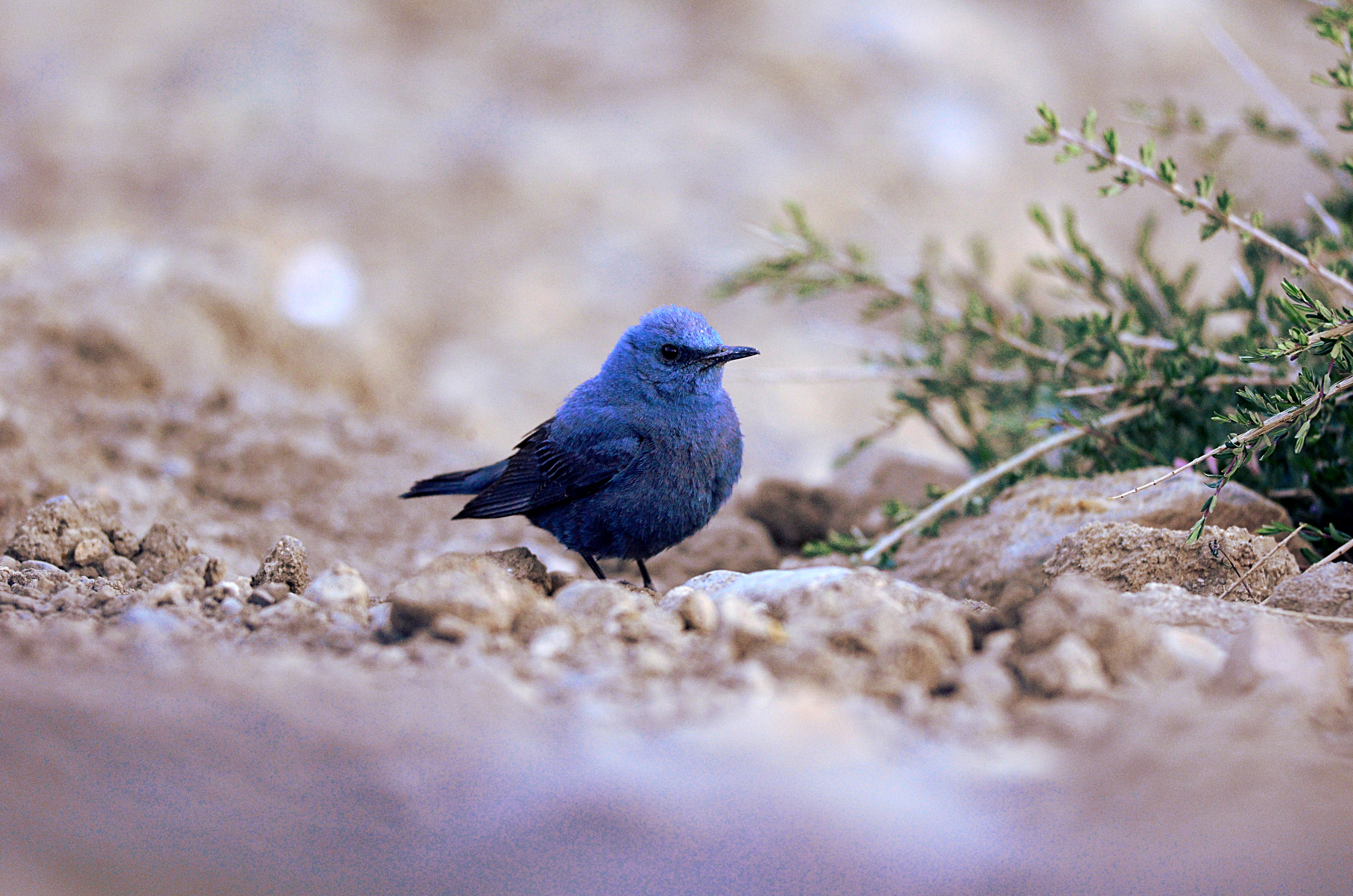

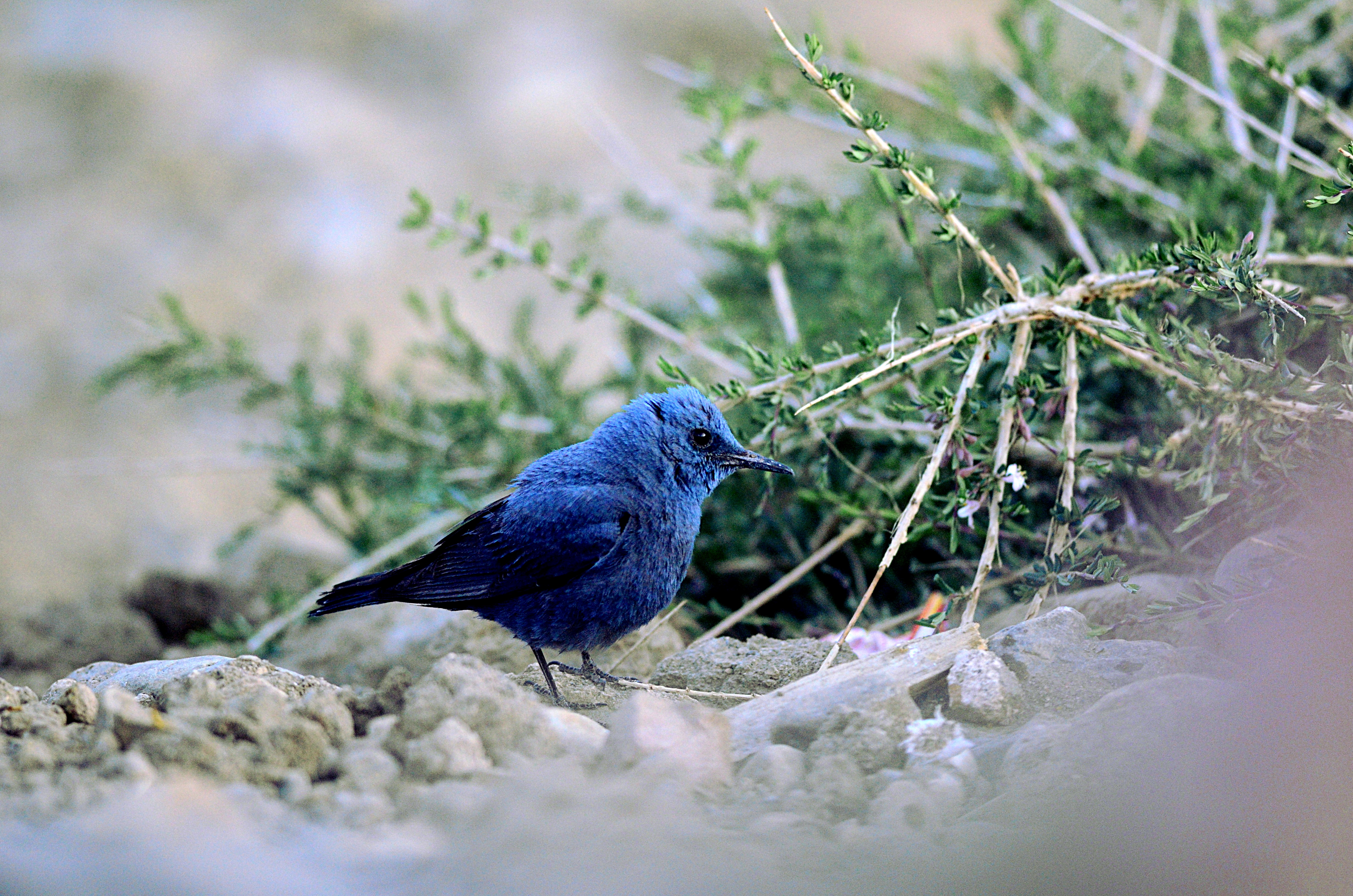

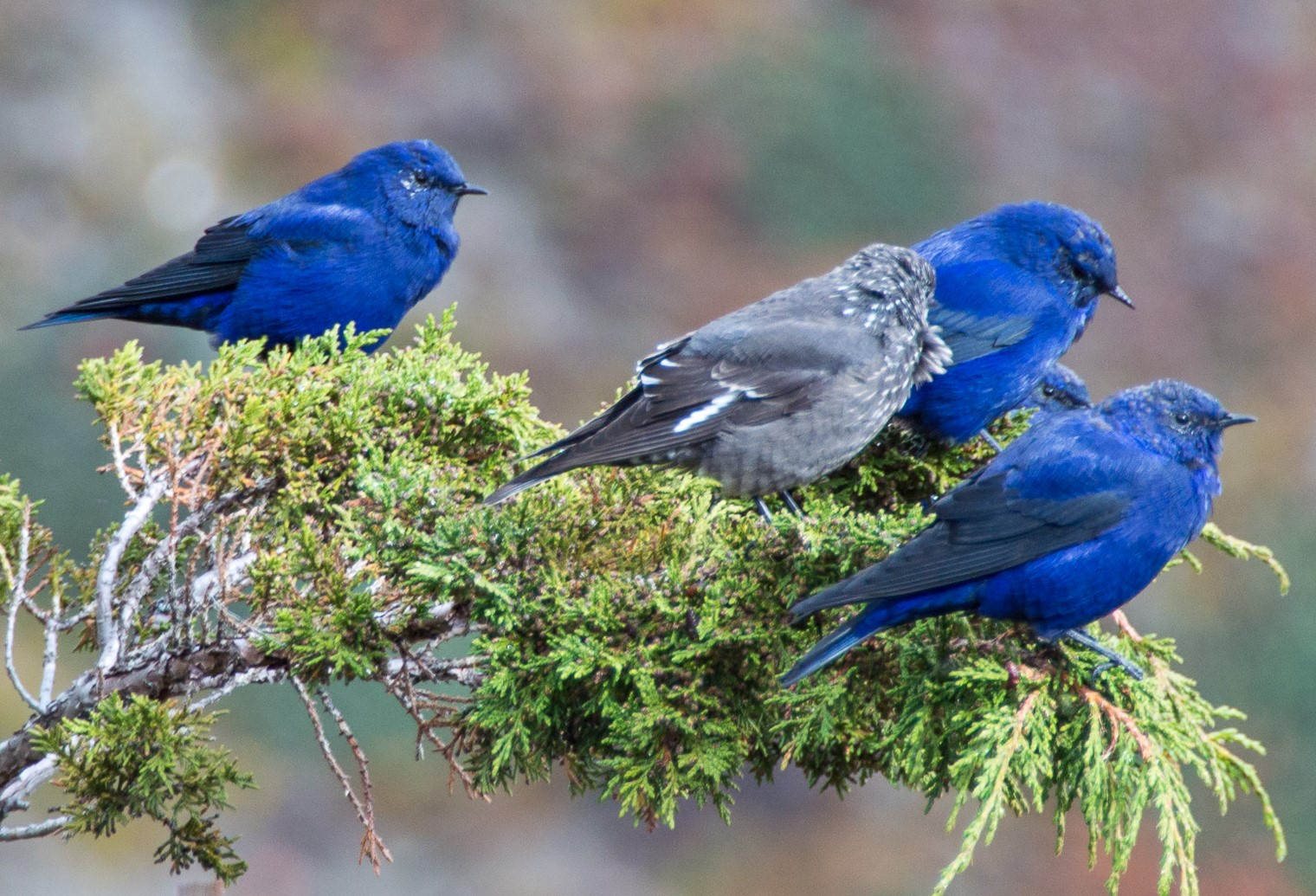
Three blue males and a grey female of Grandalas
