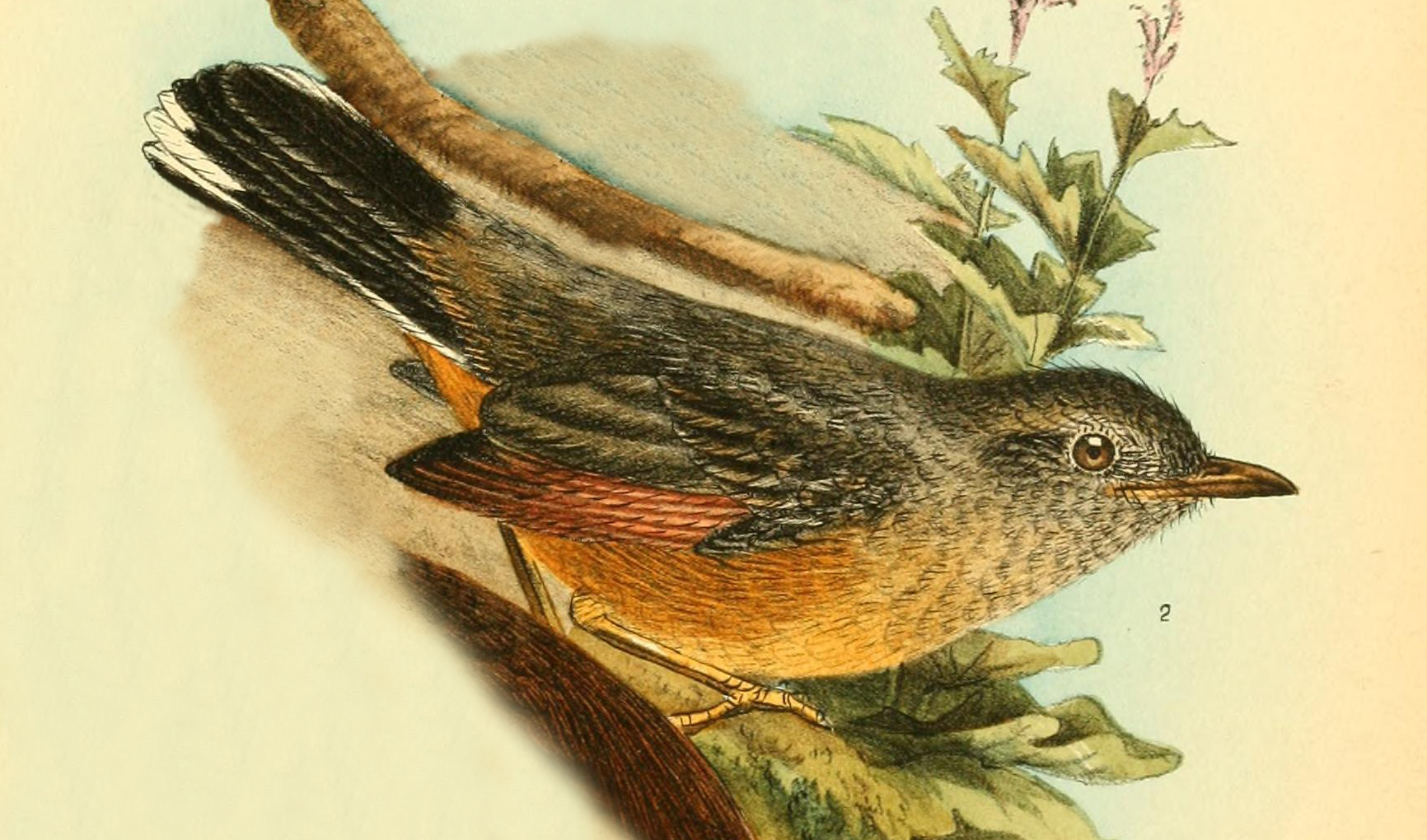

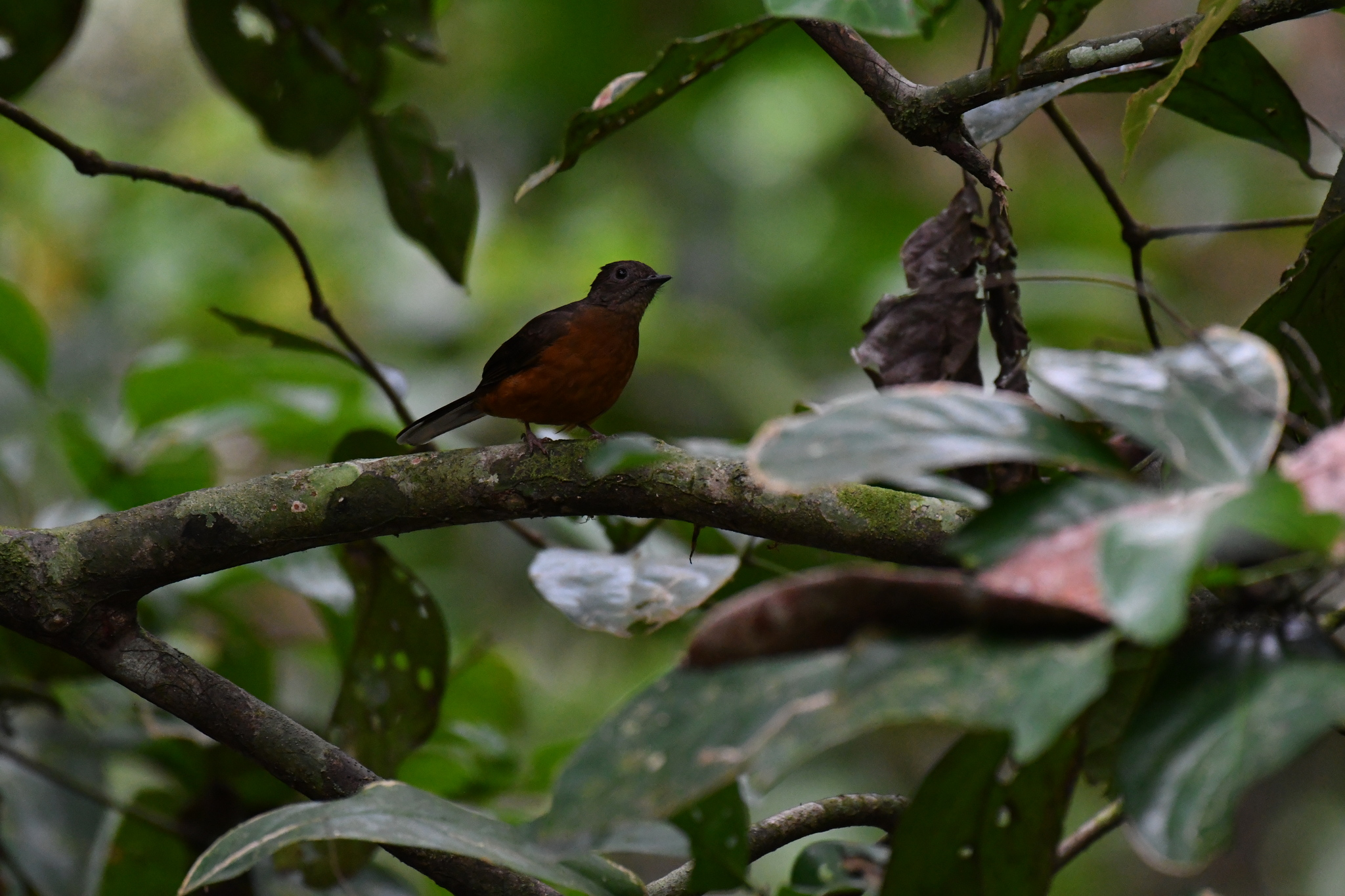

Conservation status
- Least Concern (IUCN 3.1)

Scientific classification
- Kingdom: Animalia
- Phylum: Chordata
- Class: Aves
- Order: Passeriformes
- Family: Turdidae
- Genus: Neocossyphus
- Species: N. poensis

Binomial name
- Neocossyphus poensis (Strickland, 1844)

= White-tailed ant thrush =

Species of bird

The white-tailed ant thrush (Neocossyphus poensis), also known as the white-tailed rufous thrush, is a species of bird in the family Turdidae. It is widespread across the African tropical rainforest.
