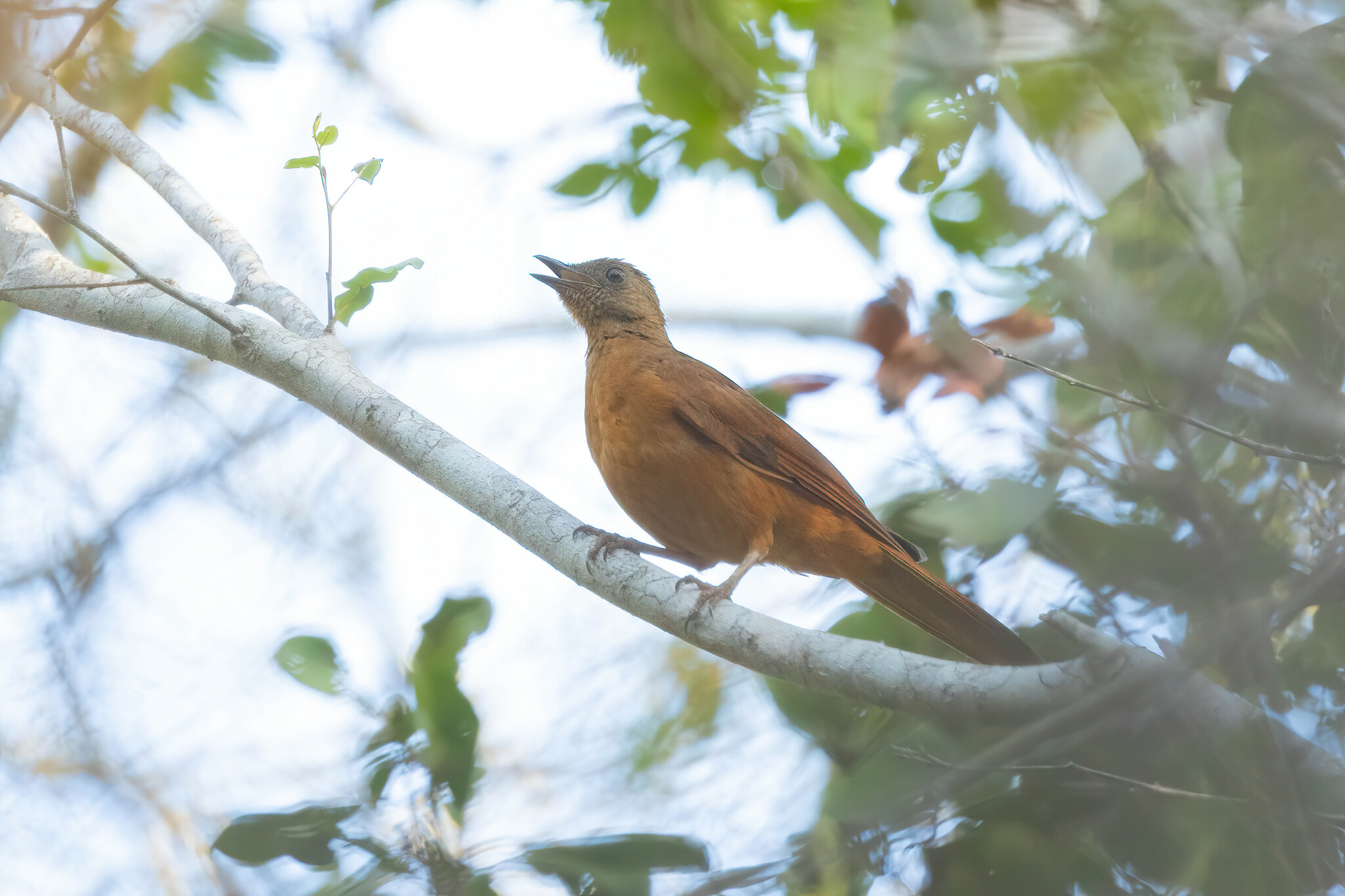

Conservation status
- Least Concern (IUCN 3.1)

Scientific classification
- Kingdom: Animalia
- Phylum: Chordata
- Class: Aves
- Order: Passeriformes
- Family: Turdidae
- Genus: Neocossyphus
- Species: N. rufus

Binomial name
- Neocossyphus rufus (Fischer, GA & Reichenow, 1884)

= Red-tailed ant thrush =

Species of bird

The red-tailed ant thrush (Neocossyphus rufus), also known as the red-tailed rufous thrush, is a species of bird in the family Turdidae. It is found in Cameroon, Central African Republic, Republic of the Congo, Democratic Republic of the Congo, Equatorial Guinea, Gabon, Kenya, Somalia, Tanzania, and Uganda. Its natural habitat is subtropical or tropical moist lowland forests.
