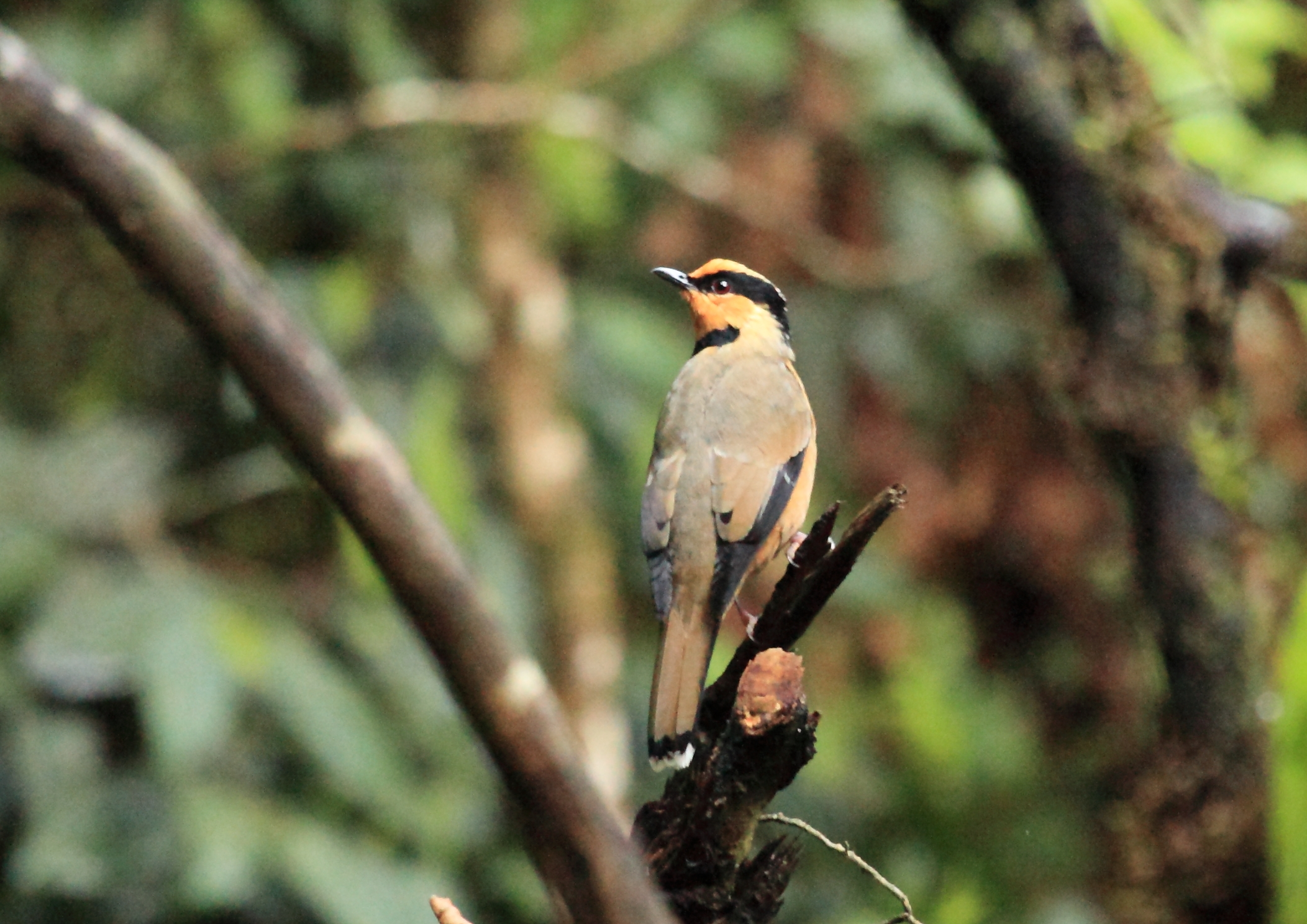

Conservation status
- Least Concern (IUCN 3.1)

Scientific classification
- Kingdom: Animalia
- Phylum: Chordata
- Class: Aves
- Order: Passeriformes
- Family: Turdidae
- Genus: Chlamydochaera; Sharpe, 1887
- Species: C. jefferyi

Binomial name
- Chlamydochaera jefferyi Sharpe, 1887

= Fruithunter =

Species of bird

The fruithunter or fruit-hunter (Chlamydochaera jefferyi), also known as the black-breasted fruit-hunter, is an enigmatic species of bird currently placed with the typical thrushes in the family Turdidae. It is native to the Borneo montane rain forests.

It is highly distinct from other thrushes, instead being convergent to Corvoidea such as trillers (Lalage) or true orioles (Oriolus). Thus it is placed in a monotypic genus Chlamydochaera. It was formerly called the black-breasted triller and placed within the family Campephagidae. Its breeding biology has only been recently detailed. The female fruithunter broods and incubates the two eggs that are laid, and the male assists in feeding the nestlings.

The fruithunter is not considered a threatened species by the IUCN.

This species was first described in 1887 by Richard Bowdler Sharpe based on specimens of a male and female collected on Mount Kinabalu.
