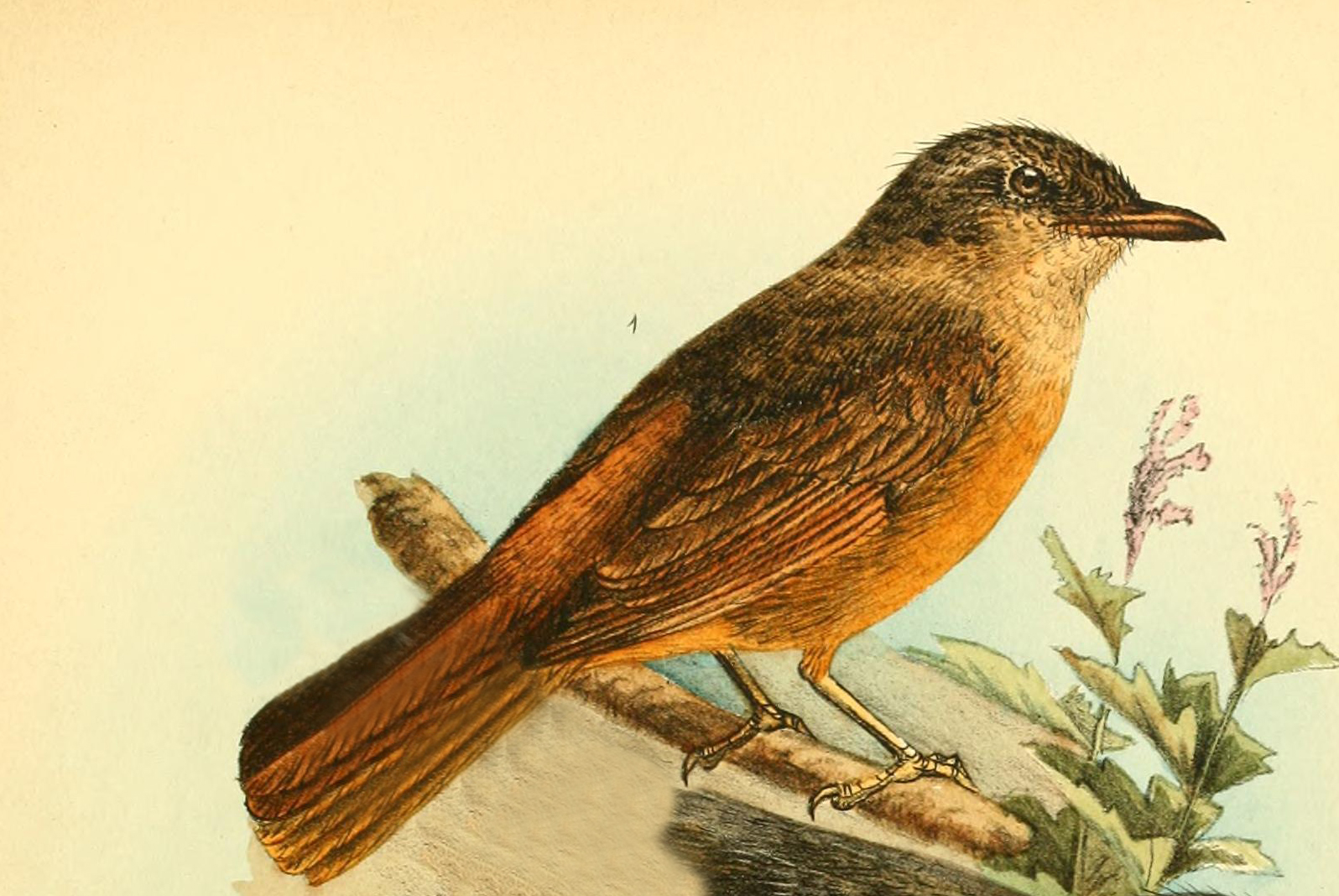
- Neocossyphus rufus illustration from Die Vögel Afrikas

Scientific classification
- Kingdom: Animalia
- Phylum: Chordata
- Class: Aves
- Order: Passeriformes
- Family: Turdidae
- Subfamily: Myadestinae
- Genus: Neocossyphus; Fischer, GA, 1884

Type species
- Pseudocossyphus rufus Fischer & Reichenow, 1884

Species
- N. poensis (Strickland, 1844); N. rufus (Fischer & Reichenow, 1884)

= Neocossyphus =

Genus of birds

The ant thrushes are medium-sized insectivorous birds in the genus Neocossyphus of the thrush family Turdidae. These are African forest dwelling species. The genus Stizorhina is sometimes placed here.

== Species ==
The following two species are currently recognized:

Genus Neocossyphus – Fischer, GA, 1884 – two species
| Common name | Scientific name and subspecies | Range | Size and ecology | IUCN status and estimated population |
|---|---|---|---|---|
| White-tailed ant thrush | Neocossyphus poensis (Strickland, 1844) | Angola, Cameroon, Central African Republic, Republic of the Congo, Democratic Republic of the Congo, Ivory Coast, Equatorial Guinea, Gabon, Ghana, Guinea, Kenya, Liberia, Nigeria, Sierra Leone, Tanzania, Togo, and Uganda. | Size: Habitat: Diet: | LC |
| Red-tailed ant thrush | Neocossyphus rufus (Fischer & Reichenow, 1884) | Cameroon, Central African Republic, Republic of the Congo, Democratic Republic of the Congo, Equatorial Guinea, Gabon, Kenya, Somalia, Tanzania, and Uganda. | Size: Habitat: Diet: | LC |
