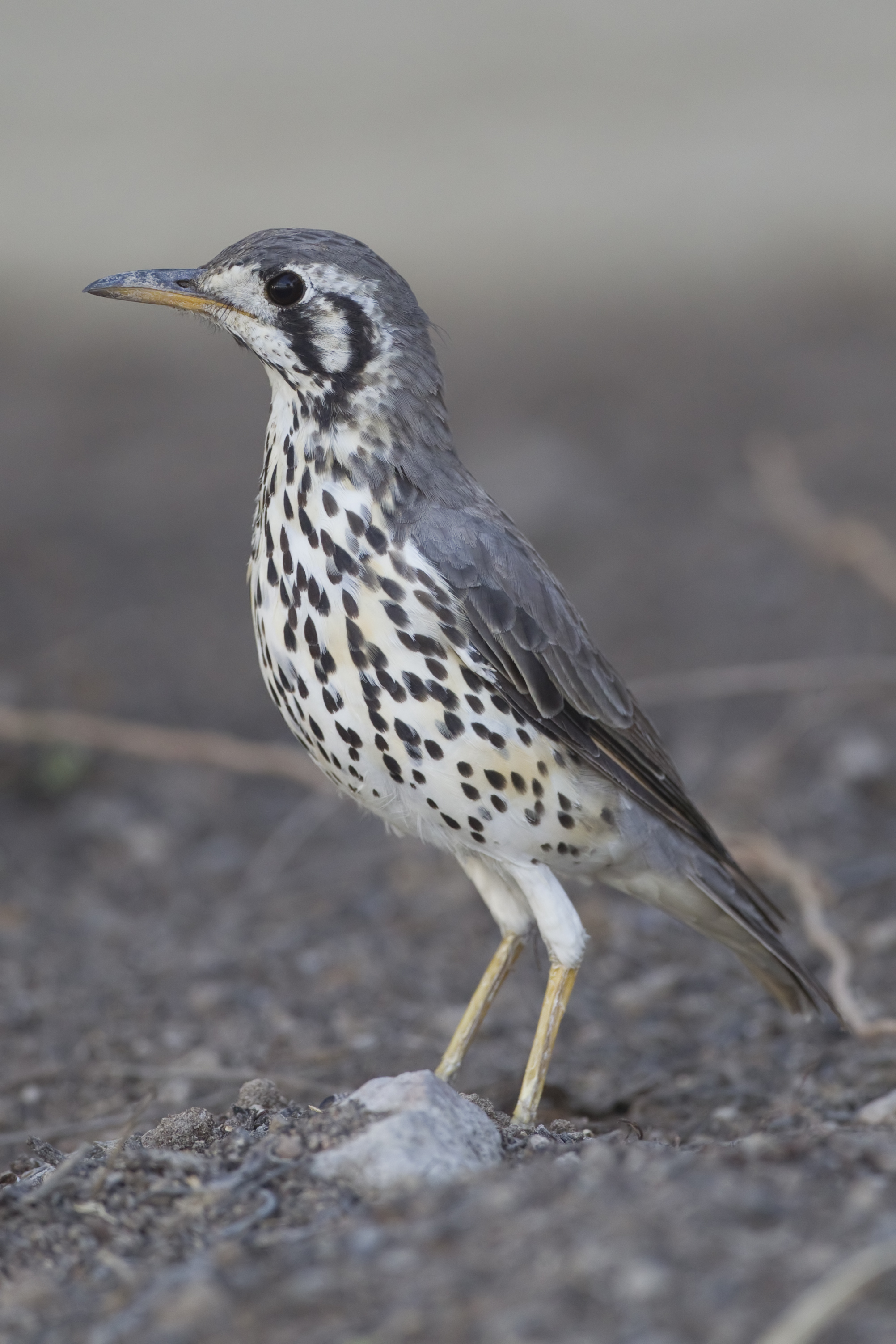
- Groundscraper thrush (Turdus litsitsirupa)

Scientific classification
- Kingdom: Animalia
- Phylum: Chordata
- Class: Aves
- Order: Passeriformes
- Superfamily: Muscicapoidea
- Family: Turdidae; Rafinesque, 1815

Subfamilies
- Myadestinae; Turdinae

= Thrush (bird) =

Thrushes

Family of birds

The thrushes are a passerine bird family, Turdidae, with a worldwide distribution. The family was once much larger before biologists reclassified the former subfamily Saxicolinae, which includes the chats and European robins, as Old World flycatchers. Thrushes are small to medium-sized ground living birds that feed on insects, other invertebrates, and fruit. Some unrelated species around the world have been named after thrushes due to their similarity to birds in this family.

== Characteristics ==
Thrushes are plump, soft-plumaged, small to medium-sized birds that inhabit wooded areas and often feed on the ground. The largest thrush is the great thrush at 128 to 175 g (4 1/2 to 6 1/8 oz) and 28 to 33 cm (11 to 13 in); the larger, commonly recognized blue whistling thrush is an Old World flycatcher. The Amami thrush might, however, grow larger than the great thrush. Most species are grey or brown in colour, often with speckled underparts.

Thrushes are insectivores, but most species also eat worms, land snails, and fruit (usually berries). Many species are permanently resident in warm climates, while others migrate to higher latitudes during the summer, often over considerable distances.

Thrushes build cup-shaped nests, sometimes lining them with mud. They lay two to five speckled eggs, sometimes laying two or more clutches per year. Both parents help raise the young. In almost all cases, the nest is placed on a branch; the only exceptions are the three species of bluebird, which nest in holes.

== Ecology ==
Turdidae species spread the seeds of plants, contributing to the dispersal of many species and the recovery of ecosystems.

Plants have limited seed dispersal mobility away from the parent plant and consequently rely upon a variety of dispersal vectors to transport their propagules, including both abiotic and biotic vectors. Seeds can be dispersed away from the parent plant individually or collectively, as well as dispersed in both space and time.

Many bats and birds rely heavily on fruits for their diet, including birds in the families Cotingidae, Columbidae, Trogonidae, Turdidae, and Ramphastidae. While eating fruit, these animals swallow seeds and then later regurgitate them or pass them in their faeces. Such ornithochory has been a major mechanism of seed dispersal across ocean barriers.

Other seeds may stick to the feet or feathers of birds and in this way may travel long distances. Seeds of grasses, spores of algae, and the eggs of molluscs and other invertebrates commonly establish in remote areas after long journeys of this sort. The Turdidae have a great ecological importance because some populations migrate long distances and disperse the seeds of endangered plant species at new sites, helping to eliminate inbreeding and increasing the genetic diversity of local flora.

A dusky thrush in Tokyo.

== Taxonomy ==
The family Turdidae was introduced (as Turdinia) by the French polymath Constantine Samuel Rafinesque in 1815. The taxonomic treatment of this large family has varied significantly in recent years. Traditionally, the Turdidae included the small Old World species, like the nightingale and European robin in the subfamily Saxicolinae, but most authorities now place this group in the Old World flycatcher family Muscicapidae. Molecular phylogenetic analysis has shown that the family Turdidae is a member of the superfamily Muscicapoidea and is sister to the family Muscicapidae. The two families diverged in the Miocene around 17 million years ago.

The family formerly included more species. At the time of the publication of the third edition of Howard and Moore Complete Checklist of the Birds of the World in 2003, the genera Myophonus, Alethe, Brachypteryx and Heinrichia were included in Turdidae. Subsequent molecular phylogenetic studies have shown that the species in these four genera are more closely related to species in the family Muscicapidae. As a consequence, these four genera are now placed in Muscicapidae. In contrast, the genus Cochoa which had previously been placed in Muscicapidae, was shown to belong in Turdidae.

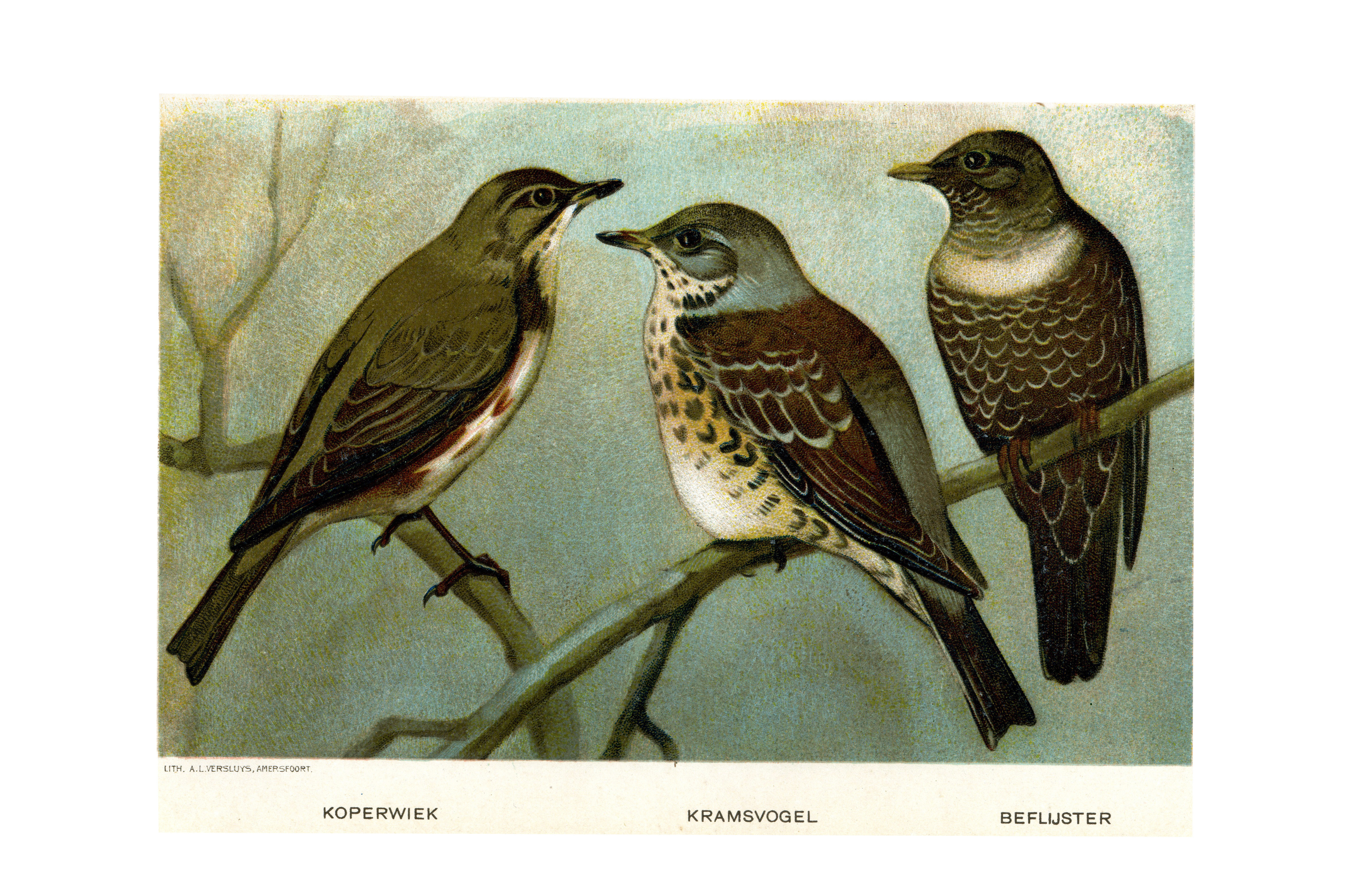
Redwing, fieldfare, ring ouzel

The genus level phylogeny shown below is based on a molecular genetic study by Ana Dantur and collaborators that was published in 2026. The monotypic genus Pinarornis containing the boulder chat was not included in the study. The numbers in each genus show below are from the taxonomy published by AviList.

- Turdidae
  - - - Grandala – grandala
      - Sialia – bluebirds (3 species)
    - - - Myadestes – solitaires (13 species)
        - - Neocossyphus – ant thrushes (2 species)
          - Stizorhina – rufous thrushes (2 species)
      - - - - Ixoreus – varied thrush
            - Ridgwayia – Aztec thrush
          - - Hylocichla – wood thrush
            - - Catharus – nightingale-thrushes (13 species)
              - - Cichlopsis – rufous-brown solitaire
                - Entomodestes – solitaires (2 species)
        - - - Zoothera – Asian thrushes (22 species)
            - - Chlamydochaera – fruithunter
              - Cochoa – cochoas (4 species)
          - - Geokichla – thrushes (21 species)
            - Turdus – thrushes (105 species)

== Genera ==
The family contains 194 species, which are divided into 17 genera:

- Grandala – grandala
- Sialia – bluebirds (3 species)
- Stizorhina – rufous thrushes (2 species)
- Neocossyphus – ant thrushes (2 species)
- Pinarornis – boulder chat
- Myadestes – solitaires (13 species, including two recently extinct)
- Chlamydochaera – fruithunter
- Cochoa – cochoas (4 species)
- Ixoreus – varied thrush
- Ridgwayia – Aztec thrush
- Cichlopsis – rufous-brown solitaire
- Entomodestes – solitaires (2 species)
- Hylocichla – wood thrush
- Catharus – American thrushes and nightingale-thrushes (13 species)
- Zoothera – Asian thrushes (22 species, including one recently extinct)
- Geokichla – medium-sized thrushes (21 species)
- Turdus – typical thrushes (105 species, including two recently extinct)

== Cooking ==
The thrush is one of the many kinds of small bird that have in the past been trapped and eaten in much of Europe; the practice is now rare. Among traditional ways of cooking thrush were with polenta or grilled on a skewer, in Italy; with juniper berries in Belgium; and made into a pâté or terrine. The French cook and cookery writer Marie-Antoine Carême recommended cooking thrushes in crépinettes and serving with sauce Périgueux.
