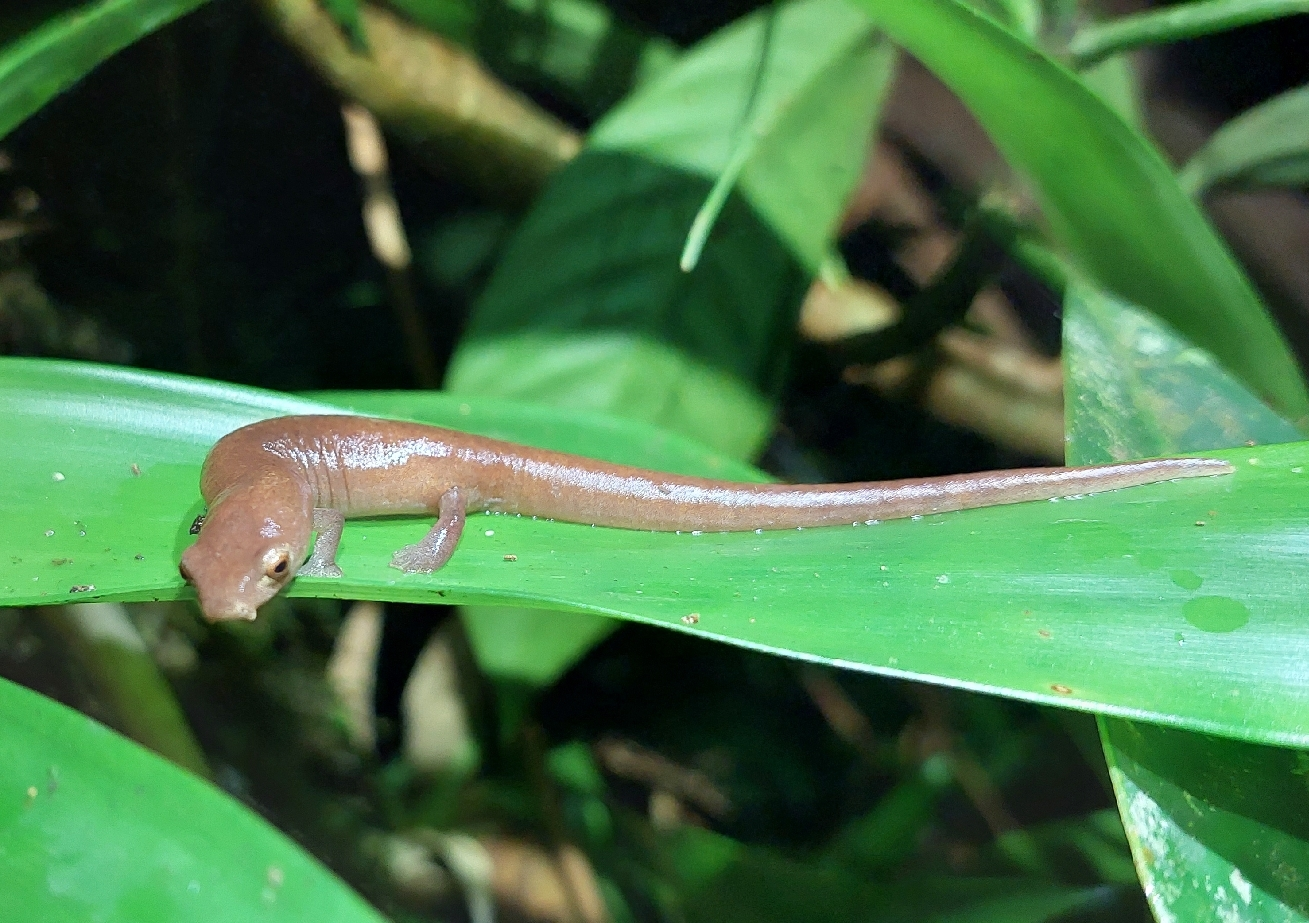

Conservation status
- Critically Endangered (IUCN 3.1)

Scientific classification
- Kingdom: Animalia
- Phylum: Chordata
- Class: Amphibia
- Order: Urodela
- Family: Plethodontidae
- Genus: Bolitoglossa
- Species: B. chucantiensis

Binomial name
- Bolitoglossa chucantiensis Batista, Köhler, Mebert & Vesely, 2014

= Bolitoglossa chucantiensis =

Species of salamander

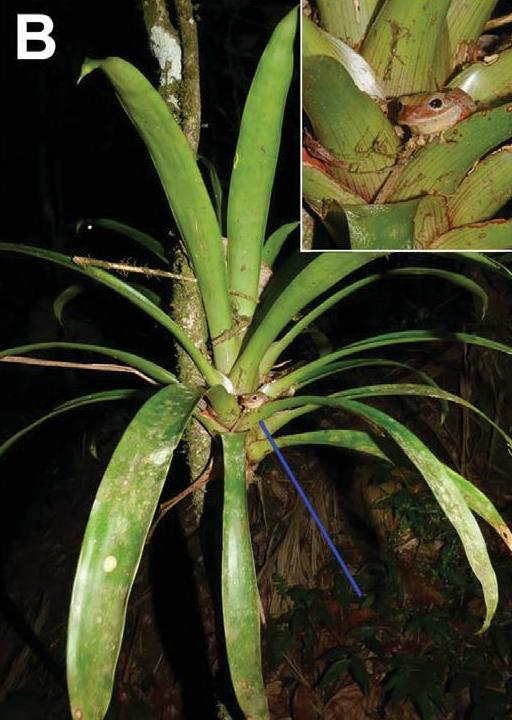
Understory of Cerro Chucanti (1,300 m asl) composed of bromeliads; Pristimantis gretathunbergae in situ.

Bolitoglossa chucantiensis, referred to as the Chucantí salamander in English or salamandra de Chucantí in Spanish, is a rare species of neotropical lungless salamander in the family Plethodontidae. This species of salamander is endemic to the country of Panama and is one of numerous species of reptiles and amphibians exclusively found within the Serranía de Majé mountain range, which include Pristimantis gretathunbergae, Diasporus majeensis, and Tantilla berguidoi. The Serranía de Majé is located in the southeastern region of the cloud forests at Reserva Natural Privada Chucantí (Chucantí Private Nature Reserve), situated in the province of Darién. The species epithet of the Chucantí salamander is derived after its type locality, Cerro Chucantí. Cerro Chucantí is the peak of the Serranía de Majé, reaching a maximum height of 1,439 meters.

== Physical description ==
The Chucantí salamander is described as a small, terrestrial salamander with a snout-vent length (SVL) of at least 47 millimeters (approximately 1.85 inches) and an overall body length of at least 55 millimeters (approximately 2.16 inches). Its tail length (TL) is also a minimum of 55 millimeters (approximately 2.16 inches). In its natural state, the Chucantí salamander's coloration ranges from reddish brown to maroon on the dorsal side, with yellow speckling or streaks. Its pharyngeal and ocular regions, including its iris, are also a brown to yellowish color. However, when preserved in ethanol, this species' appearance is mottled brown to gray on the dorsal region.

Species identification can be difficult due to its similarities in proportions and coloration with other species within the same genus, such as B. taylori or B. cuna. However, it can be easily distinguished from other congeners based on phenotypic and genotypic traits, such as its geographic location, dentition, mitochondrial DNA genetic distance, distinct coloration patterns, and digit morphology. Regardless of sex, the toes are characterized by complete webbing, with subterminal padding at toes 2 through 4 and fingers 2 and 3; in addition, slight indentations can be viewed between the toe and fingertips.

There is considerable evidence that the Chucantí salamander may exhibit sexual dimorphism. In males, the quantity of maxillary teeth (MT) of B. chucantiensis is higher than other species within the Bolitoglossa genus, with a minimum of 65 in proportion to its SVL. This salamander species can also be sexed based on the presence of a rounded hedonic mental gland and post-iliac glands; both of these structures have been verified in males. By contrast, any confirmed observations of females remain limited due to a reduced sample size of observed specimens.

A map of the country of Panama. Darién is indicated in red.

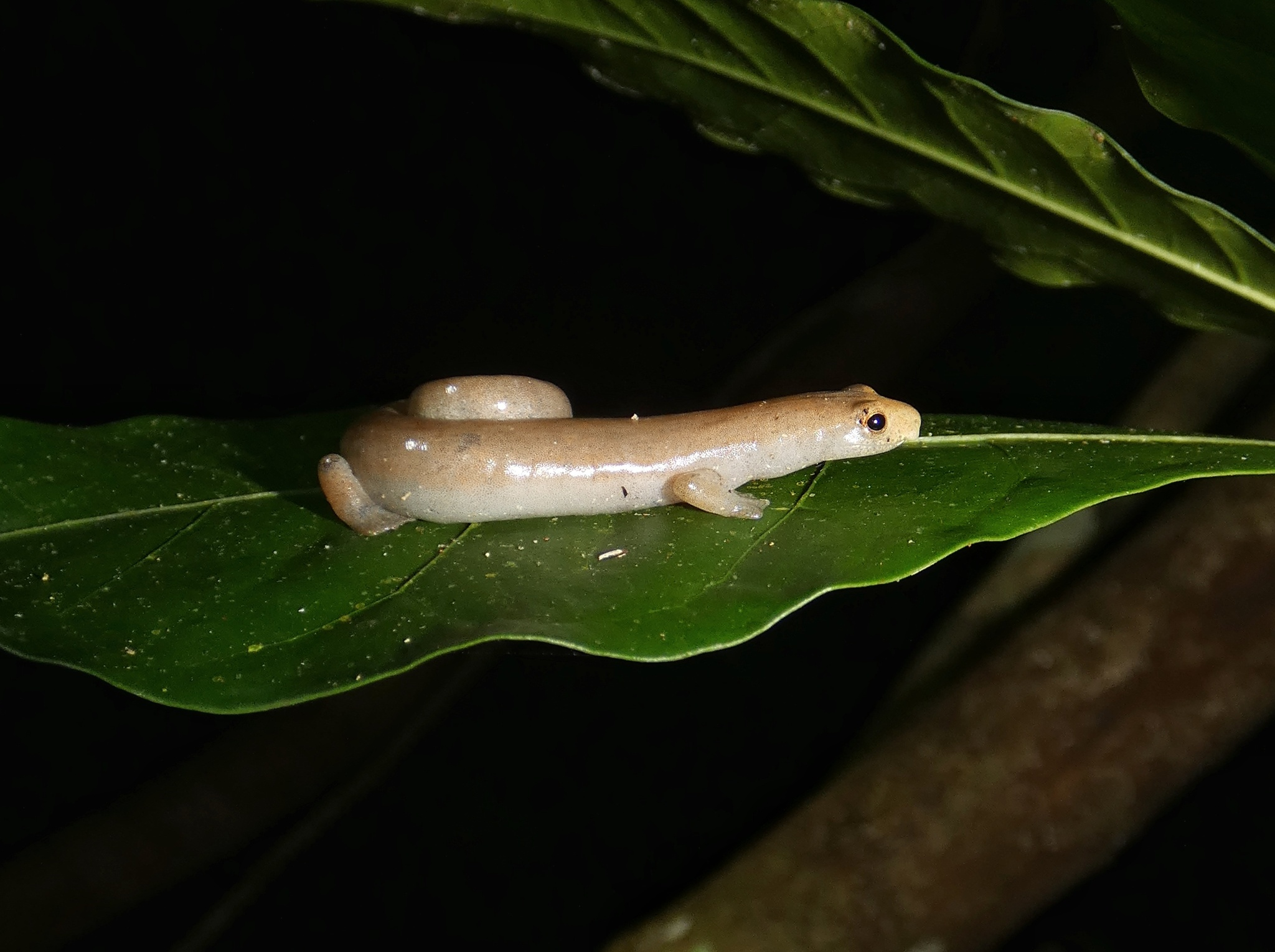
Image of B. cuna, a salamander of a similar size to B. chucantiensis.

== History ==
The Chucantí salamander was initially discovered in 2008 before subsequently being rediscovered during a series of scientific expeditions between 2011 and 2012 by a group of herpetologists, including Abel Batista (Panama), Konrad Mebert (Switzerland), Gunther Köhler (Germany), and Milan Vesely (Czech Republic). As of 2021, only two observations have been confirmed and described at an elevation of approximately 1,424 meters above sea level. Both confirmed observations were made shortly after rainfall and at night, with the holotype of this species discovered resting upon a palm leaf.

== Geographic distribution ==
The range of B. chucantiensis is estimated to be approximately two square kilometers (km^{2}) and limited to the premontane cloud forest at the summit of Cerro Chucantí. Every recorded instance of this salamander species has depicted its type locality as surrounded by palm leaves, mosses, and bromeliads; the ecologically rich understory of its environment is primarily composed of palms, vines, and epiphytes. Due to all recordings of its presence being exclusive to this part of the environment, it has been hypothesized that this species is nocturnal and arboreal.

== Behaviors ==
=== Sexual behaviors ===
There is currently a lack of information regarding the reproductive behaviors of the Chucantí salamander. Still, based on the known presence of mental glands in this species, it is likely used during courtship displays. Mental glands are vital elements of sexual selection in the Plethodontidae family, as they facilitate the production and transmission of pheromones. Mental glands have been observed in the Bolitoglossinae, Spelerpinae, and Plethodontinae subfamilies; this suggests that these structures may play a significant role in sexual selection across multiple genera. Interactions with these structures function as part of the visual, tactile, and olfactory cues that influence mate selection as a means for signaling fitness and enhancing reproductive success.

As a member of the Plethodontidae family, B. chucantiensis likely undergoes direct development; this reproductive mode is common in most extant salamanders. This reproductive strategy substantially improves its progeny's chance of survival by allowing it to skip the aquatic larval stage, as it instead emerges as a juvenile. This also lessens its risk of predation and other environmental hazards, reducing competition in its early stages of life.

It is currently unknown whether B. chucantiensis breeds seasonally or continuously, as this is a species-dependent trait. The Chucantí salamander likely lays eggs; the eggs of other members of the Plethodontidae family and genus Bolitoglossa have been described as large and yolky, indicating the likelihood for the larvae of this species to be lecithotrophic. The clutch size for this species has yet to be determined, as it is a variable trait among species within this genus.

=== Anti-predation behaviors ===
It is currently unknown whether this species secretes toxins, as this trait varies widely among congeners. Toxins released by species of salamanders are not always lethal. However, predator consumption of more toxic species, such as B. rostrata or B. subpalmata, has been linked to oral paralysis, lack of coordination, unconsciousness, lack of response to external stimuli, and in some cases, death. There are no known predators of the Chucantí salamander. However, within its type locality, reports have confirmed the presence of Dendrophidion percarinatum and other species of snakes, all of which are carnivorous and have a diet that consists of reptiles, amphibians, and some species of insects.

Bolitoglossa chucantiensis, like all known neotropical members of the genus Bolitoglossa, likely participates in tail autotomy as an anti-predator mechanism. Since the tails store a significant amount of fat in bolitoglossine salamanders, this may be used after other adaptations, such as epidermal toxins, tail strikes, or undulations, have failed. Tail autotomy has been observed in multiple species, including some insects, crustaceans, reptiles, and amphibians; this suggests that this may be useful in long-term organismal survival despite the high energetic cost of tissue regeneration.

== Diet ==
Not much is known about the feeding ecology of B. chucantiensis due to the lack of studies regarding this species of salamander. However, members of the same genus are characterized as a generalist feeder and primarily insectivorous, with a diet of arthropods such as ants, beetles, and mites.

== Threats ==
In a 2015 study assessing the conservation status of a variety of Central American herpetofauna, it was determined that the individual Environmental Vulnerability Score for B. chucantiensis is 18, indicating a high risk of extinction for this species. Since the range of B. chucantiensis is extremely limited, it is highly vulnerable to environmental stressors and pressures. Much of this is because its habitat is sensitive to environmental factors and threats, including habitat loss and fragmentation due to a long-term history of deforestation and logging.

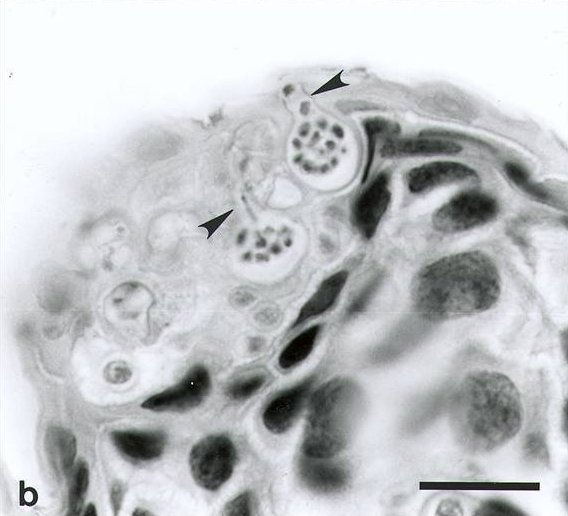
Histological analysis of the abdominal skin of Rhaebo haematiticus, infected with Batrachochytrium dendrobatidis.

The chytrid fungus Batrachochytrium dendrobatidis (Bd) has also been confirmed to be present throughout Central America, especially in the countries of Panama and Costa Rica. It has been observed in Central American herpetofauna, including Craugastor taurus, Physalaemus pustulosus, and Oophaga pumilio. As a zoonotic disease, the infection intensity and spread of Bd is highly dependent on environmental factors, including life history, elevation, and climate, with its prevalence associated with species found in riparian habitats. Despite the presence of Bd in Panama being observed since at least the 1990s, limited research has made its path of spread unclear, partially due to potentially infected amphibians being asymptomatic.

== Conservation status ==
In 2017, sponsors, including non-profit organizations ADOPTA (Asociación Adopta el Bosque Panamá), Rainforest Trust, and the International Conservation Fund of Canada (ICFC), donated funds to the Cerro Chucantí Nature Reserve, facilitating the expansion of its area by 260 acres. Despite these efforts, in 2019, the International Union for Conservation of Nature (IUCN) classified the Chucantí salamander as a Critically Endangered species.
