= Maje =

Maje may refer to:

- Brzozowo-Maje, village in Gmina Dzierzgowo, Masovian Voivodeship, Poland
- Maje McDonnell (1920-2010), American baseball coach
- Serranía de Majé, isolated mountain range in Panama
  - Majé Hydrological Reserve

== See also ==
- Maje language (disambiguation)
