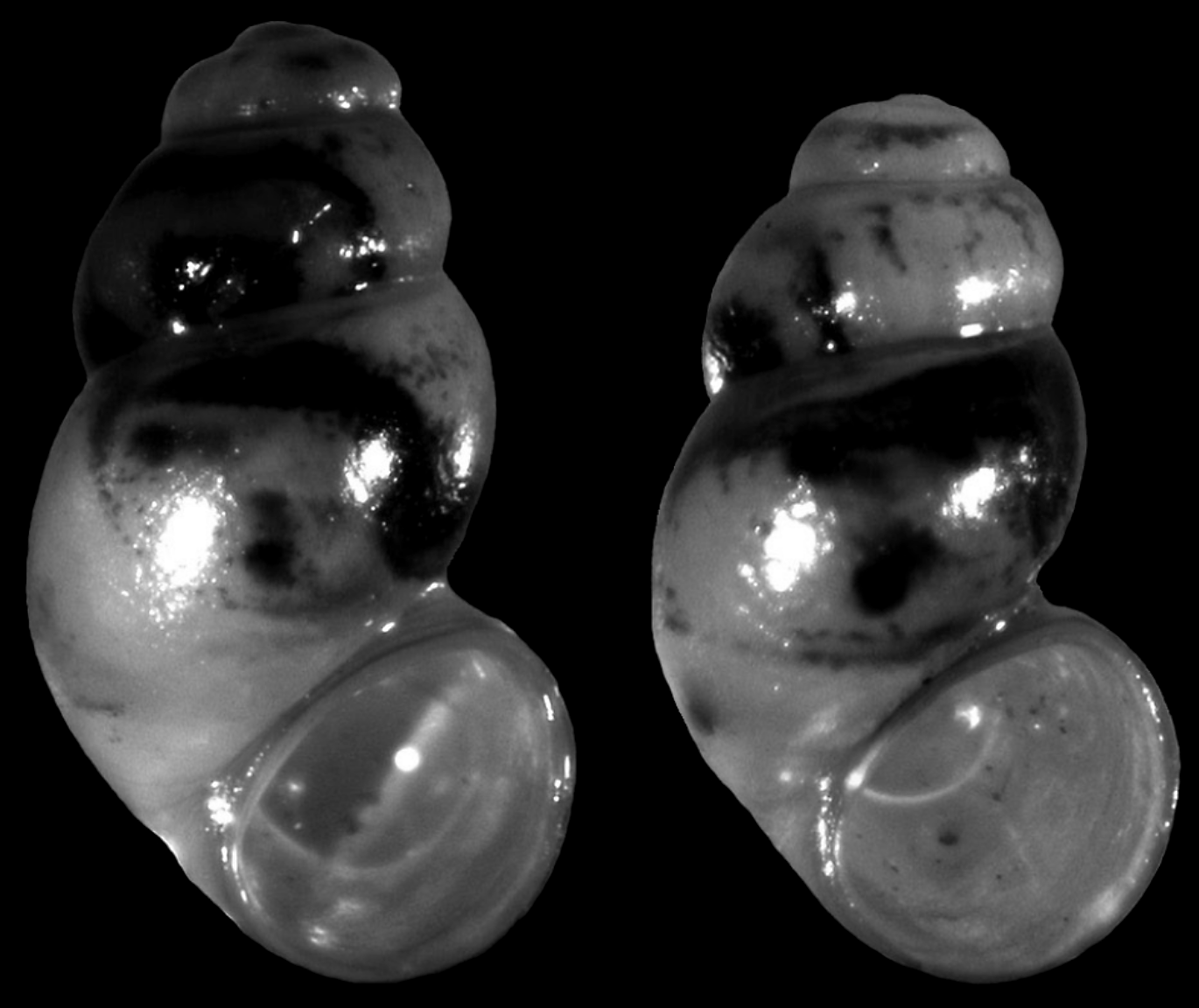

Conservation status
- Nationally Critical (NZ TCS)

Scientific classification
- Kingdom: Animalia
- Phylum: Mollusca
- Class: Gastropoda
- Subclass: Caenogastropoda
- Order: Littorinimorpha
- Family: Tateidae
- Genus: Opacuincola
- Species: O. gretathunbergae

Binomial name
- Opacuincola gretathunbergae Verhaegen & Haase, 2021

= Opacuincola gretathunbergae =

Species of molluscs

Opacuincola gretathunbergae is a freshwater snail endemic to New Zealand. It is named after the climate activist Greta Thunberg.

== Distribution ==
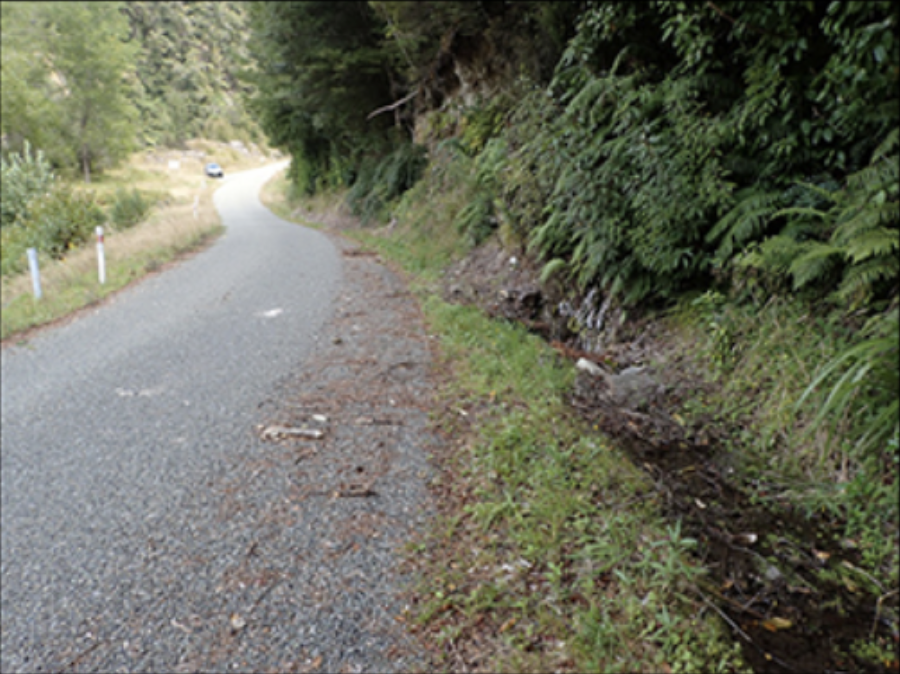
Type locality

The snail was discovered in 2016 by a research team from the University of Greifswald, which spent two weeks surveying easily-accessible water bodies in the northern South Island, and discovered multiple new species of endemic snail. This species lives in small streams with shallow and slow-flowing water, and has so far been found in just one site. It was collected off stones and debris in a trickle of water beside Cobb Dam Road in the upper Tākaka River valley, within Kahurangi National Park.

== Description ==
The sample of 20 collected had an average shell height of 2.35 mm and a height of 1.41 mm, and an aperture just under a millimetre wide. This species is closely related to Opacuincola ngatapuna, which has larger genitalia. Its well-developed eyes and pigmentation suggest it is a true crenobiont, one of a small number of species associated with freshwater springs, rather than dwelling in subterranean groundwater.

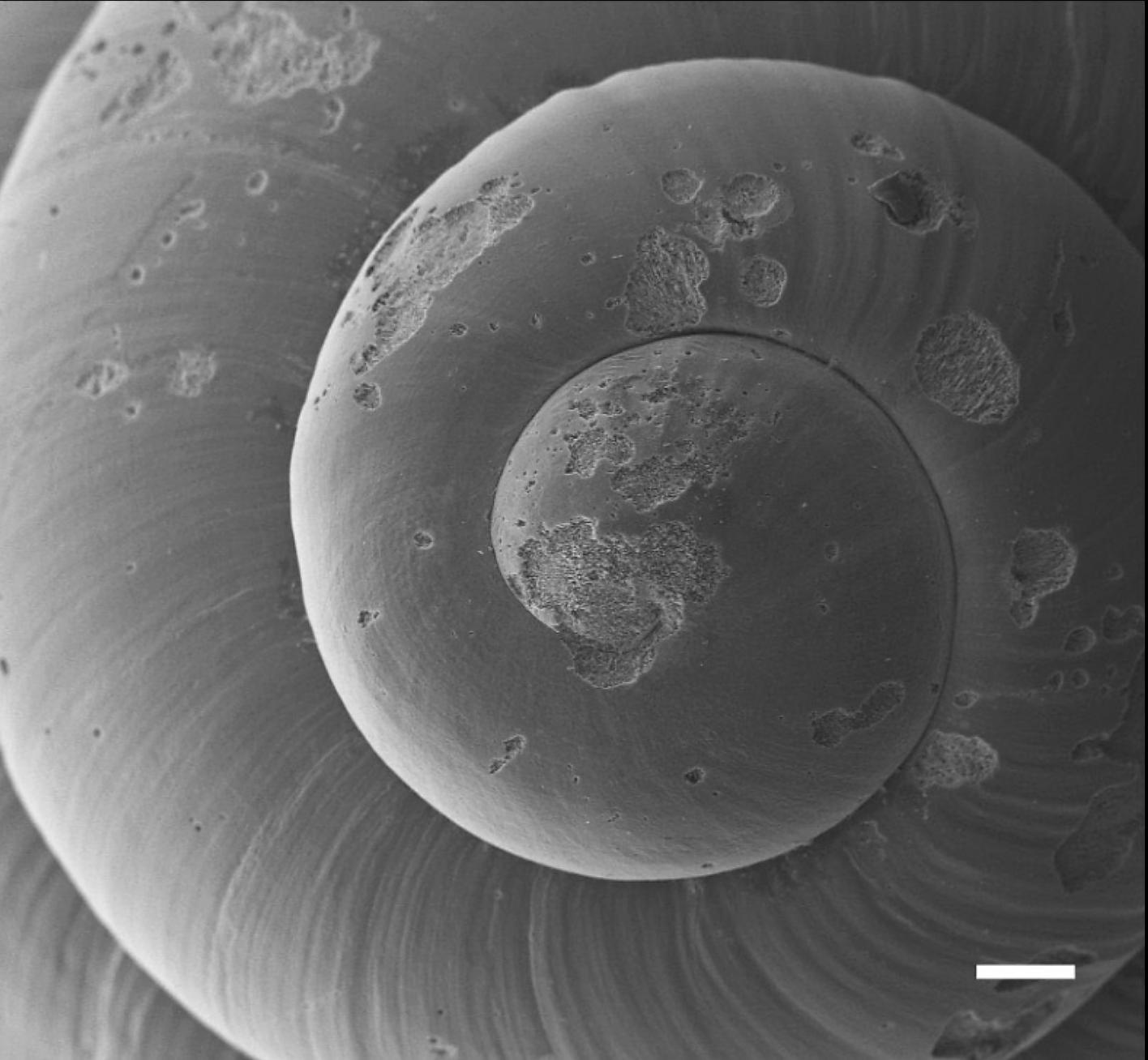
Protoconch

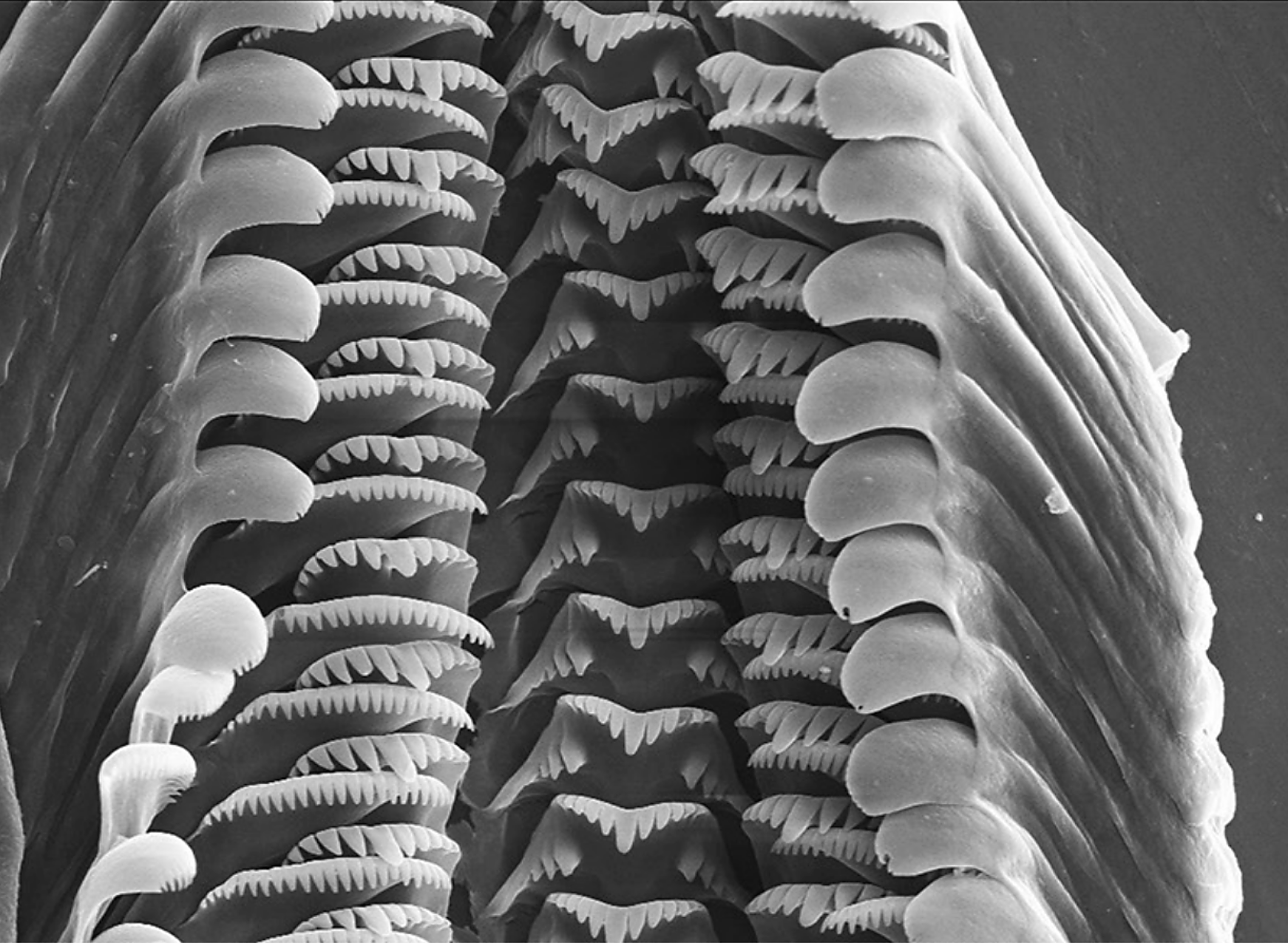
Radula

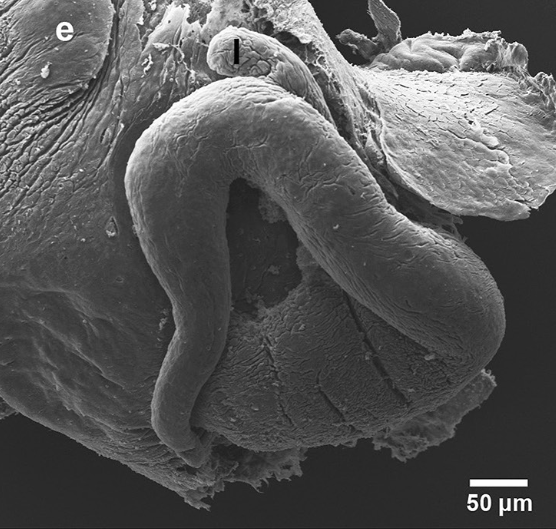
Penis

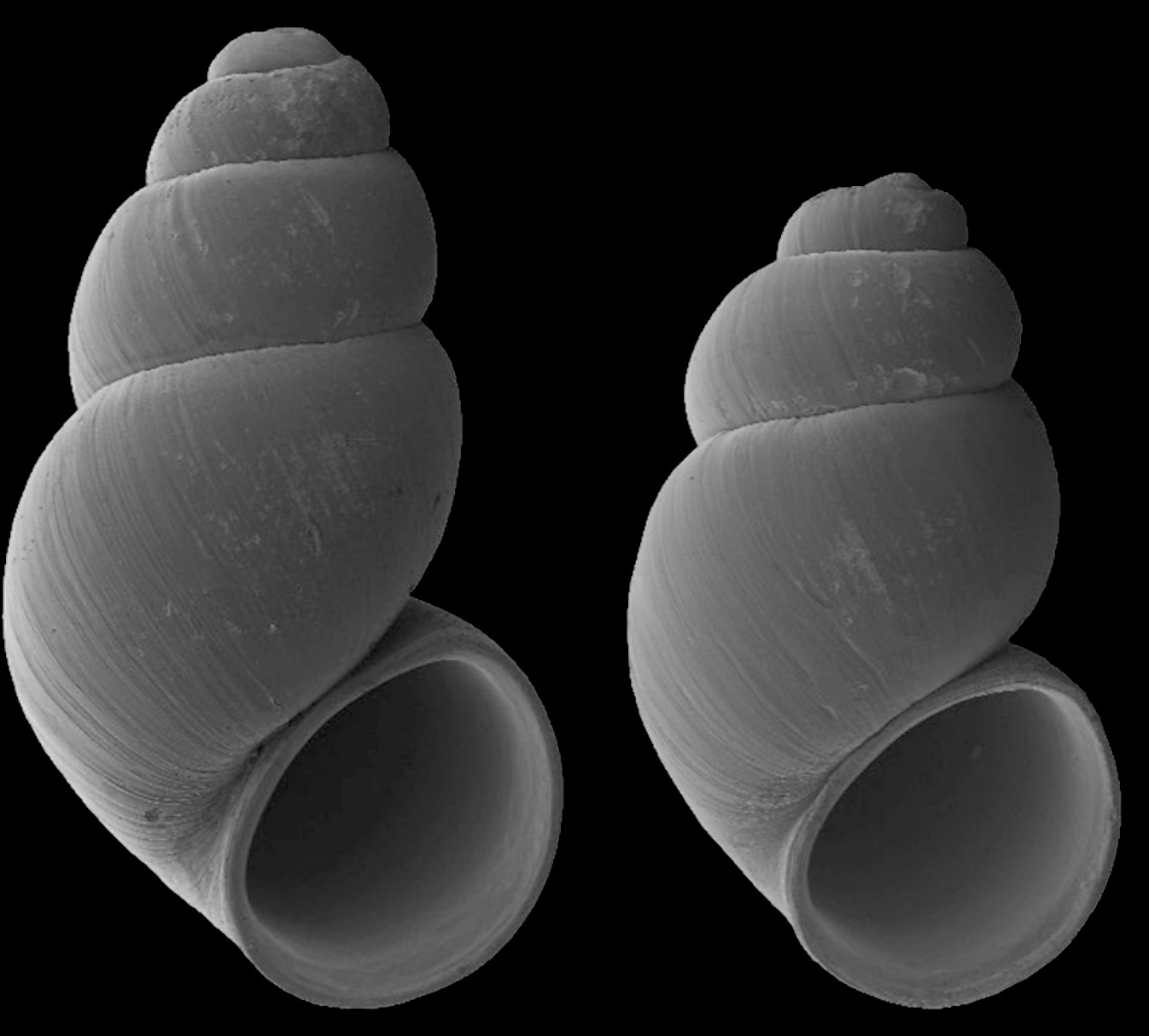
SEM photographs

== Name ==
The species is one of several named after Swedish climate activist Greta Thunberg, explained by the authors in the following words:

Starting with a single-person school strike and demonstration to save our climate she has sparked the global movement “Fridays for Future” supported primarily by young people and managed to finally get momentum in global politics toward action against climate change after warnings of scientists have been largely ignored for more than 30 years. We wish her and the movement the endurance necessary to keep the pressure up!

== See also ==
- Pristimantis gretathunbergae
