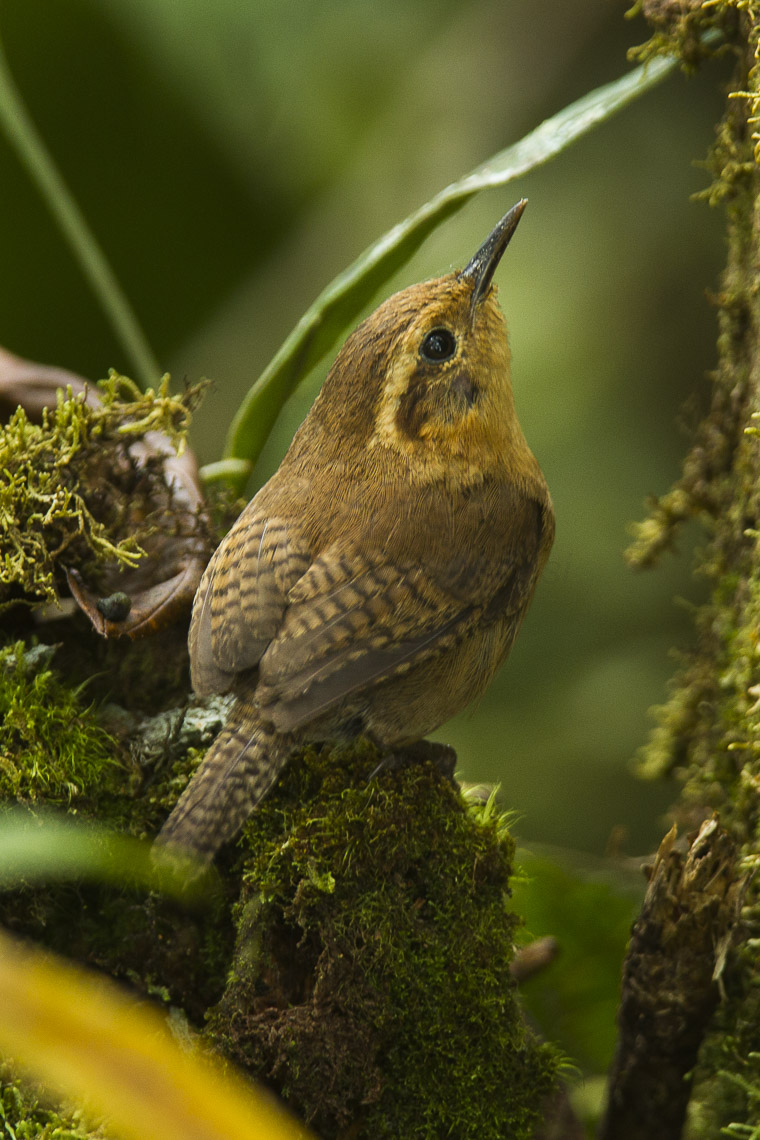
- In Ecuador

Conservation status
- Least Concern (IUCN 3.1)

Scientific classification
- Domain: Eukaryota
- Kingdom: Animalia
- Phylum: Chordata
- Class: Aves
- Order: Passeriformes
- Family: Troglodytidae
- Genus: Troglodytes
- Species: T. solstitialis

Binomial name
- Troglodytes solstitialis Sclater, PL, 1859

= Mountain wren =

Species of bird

The mountain wren (Troglodytes solstitialis) is a species of bird in the family Troglodytidae. It is found in the Andes of northwestern Argentina, Bolivia, Colombia, Ecuador, Peru, and western Venezuela.

== Taxonomy and systematics ==
The mountain wren has at times been considered to include the Santa Marta wren (Troglodytes monticola), ochraceous wren (T. achraceus), rufous-browed wren (T. rufociliatus), and tepui wren (T. rufulus) as subspecies. The South American Classification Committee of the American Ornithological Society (SACC/AOS) considers the five of them to be a superspecies. The mountain wren has five subspecies:

- T. s. solitarius Todd (1912)
- T. s. solstitialis Sclater (1859)
- T. s. macrourus Berlepsch & Stolzmann (1902)
- T. s. frater Sharpe (1882)
- T. s. auricularis Cabanis (1883)

== Description ==
The mountain wren is 10.5 to 11.5 cm (4.1 to 4.5 in) long and has a mean weight of 11.8 g (0.42 oz). The adult of the nominate subspecies has a rufous brown forehead and crown, a less reddish brown nape, shoulders, back, and rump, and a rufous brown tail with narrow black bars. The folded wings also appear barred. It has a buffy brown supercilium with a darker brown line behind the eye and warm buff cheeks. The throat and chest are also warm buff, the belly a paler buff, the flanks buffy brown with darker bars, and the vent grayish, also with darker bars. The juvenile's supercilium and upperparts are less warm and its underparts dull gray brown with darker speckles.

Subspecies T. s. solitarius differs from the nominate with darker upperparts and cheeks, a paler throat, and less reddish flanks. T. s. macrourus is larger than the nominate and has a longer tail, and the middle of its breast is white. T. s. frater is similar to macrourus but has a whitish supercilium. T. s. auricularis is similar to frater but has a shorter tail and its upperparts are not as reddish.

== Distribution and habitat ==
The subspecies of mountain wren are found thus:

- T. s. solitarius, mountains of Colombia (except in the extreme south) and western Venezuela
- T. s. solstitialis, extreme southern Colombia through Ecuador into northwestern Peru
- T. s. macrourus, eastern slope of the Peruvian Andes from the Department of San Martín south
- T. s. frater, extreme southeastern Peru and western Bolivia
- T. s. auricularis, northwestern Argentina south to Tucumán Province

The mountain wren inhabits humid montane forest, cloud forest, and their edges up to tree line. It is also sometimes found in bamboo thickets. In elevation it mostly ranges between 1,700 and 3,500 m (5,600 and 11,500 ft) but is found as low as 700 m (2,300 ft) in Argentina.

== Behavior ==
=== Feeding ===
The mountain wren usually forages in pairs or family groups and occasionally joins mixed species foraging flocks. It hunts mostly in low vegetation but also climbs into mossy trees. No analysis of its diet has been published.

=== Breeding ===
The mountain wren breeds at almost any time of year in Colombia and Peru and at least between November and February in Bolivia. One of the few nests described was a bulky structure, open topped but with a side entrance, made of root fibers and lined with dry leaves. Clutches of two to five have been noted.

=== Vocalization ===
The mountain wren's song is quiet, "a series of high notes, 'treee-treeee-tititiki'". Its calls are repetitive "'dzz' or 'di-di'".

== Status ==
The IUCN has assessed the mountain wren as being of Least Concern. It is "[c]ommon or abundant in suitable habitat in much of its range" and occurs in several protected areas.
