= Dendrophidion paucicarinatum =

Conservation status
- Least Concern (IUCN 3.1)

Scientific classification
- Kingdom: Animalia
- Phylum: Chordata
- Class: Reptilia
- Order: Squamata
- Suborder: Serpentes
- Family: Colubridae
- Genus: Dendrophidion
- Species: D. paucicarinatum

Binomial name
- Dendrophidion paucicarinatum (Cope, 1894)

Synonyms
- Drymobius paucicarinatus Cope, 1894; Dendrophidion paucicarinatus (Cope, 1894)

Species of snake

Dendrophidion paucicarinatum, commonly known as Cope's forest racer, is a snake of the colubrid family.

== Diet ==
Cope's forest racers eat frogs.

== Geographic distribution ==
The snake is found in Costa Rica and western Panama between altitudes of 1000 and 1600 meters.
