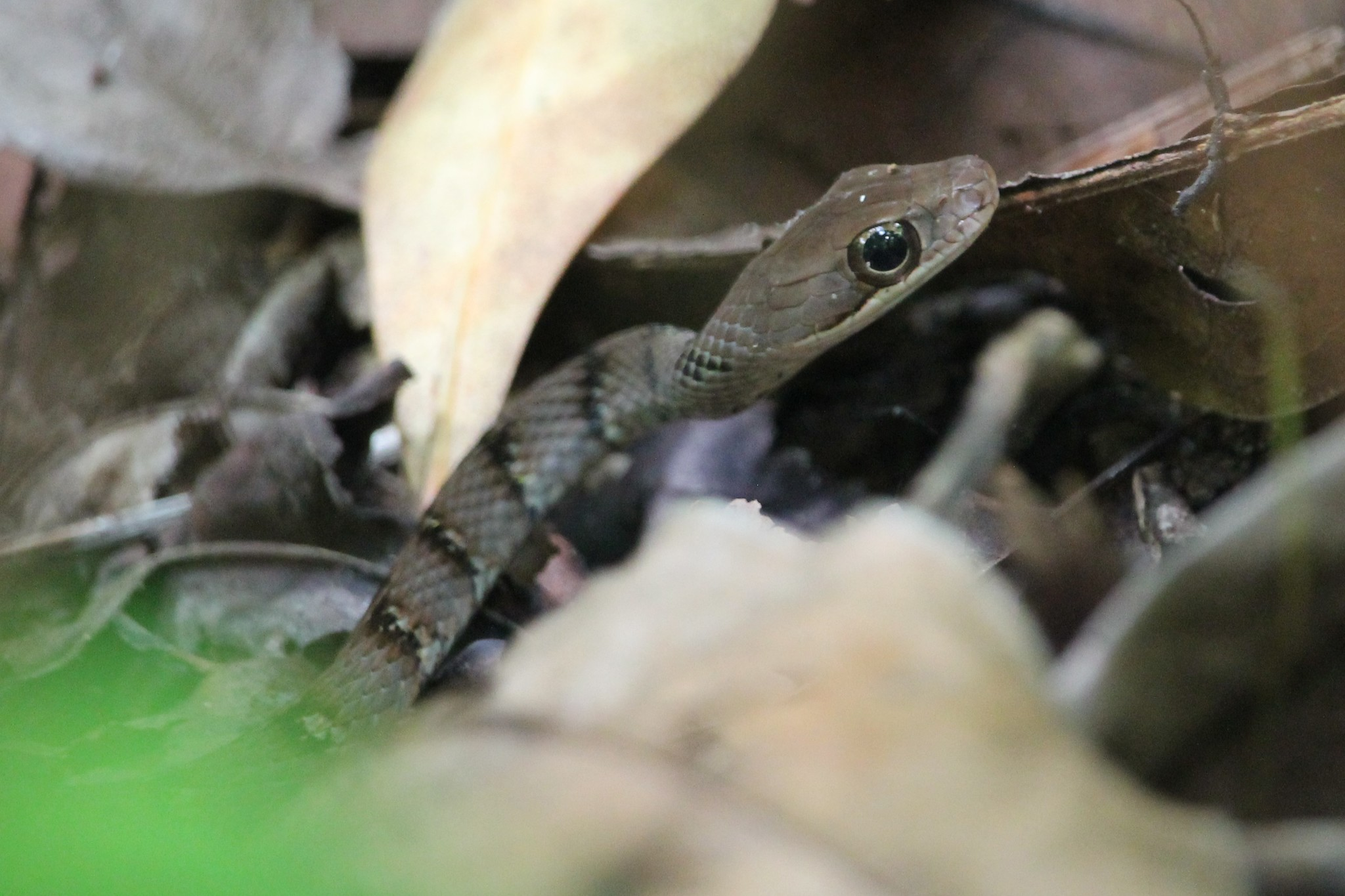

Conservation status
- Least Concern (IUCN 3.1)

Scientific classification
- Kingdom: Animalia
- Phylum: Chordata
- Class: Reptilia
- Order: Squamata
- Suborder: Serpentes
- Family: Colubridae
- Genus: Dendrophidion
- Species: D. dendrophis

Binomial name
- Dendrophidion dendrophis (Schlegel, 1837)

= Dendrophidion dendrophis =

Species of snake

Dendrophidion dendrophis, also known by its common name olive forest racer, is a species of snake from the genus Dendrophidion.
