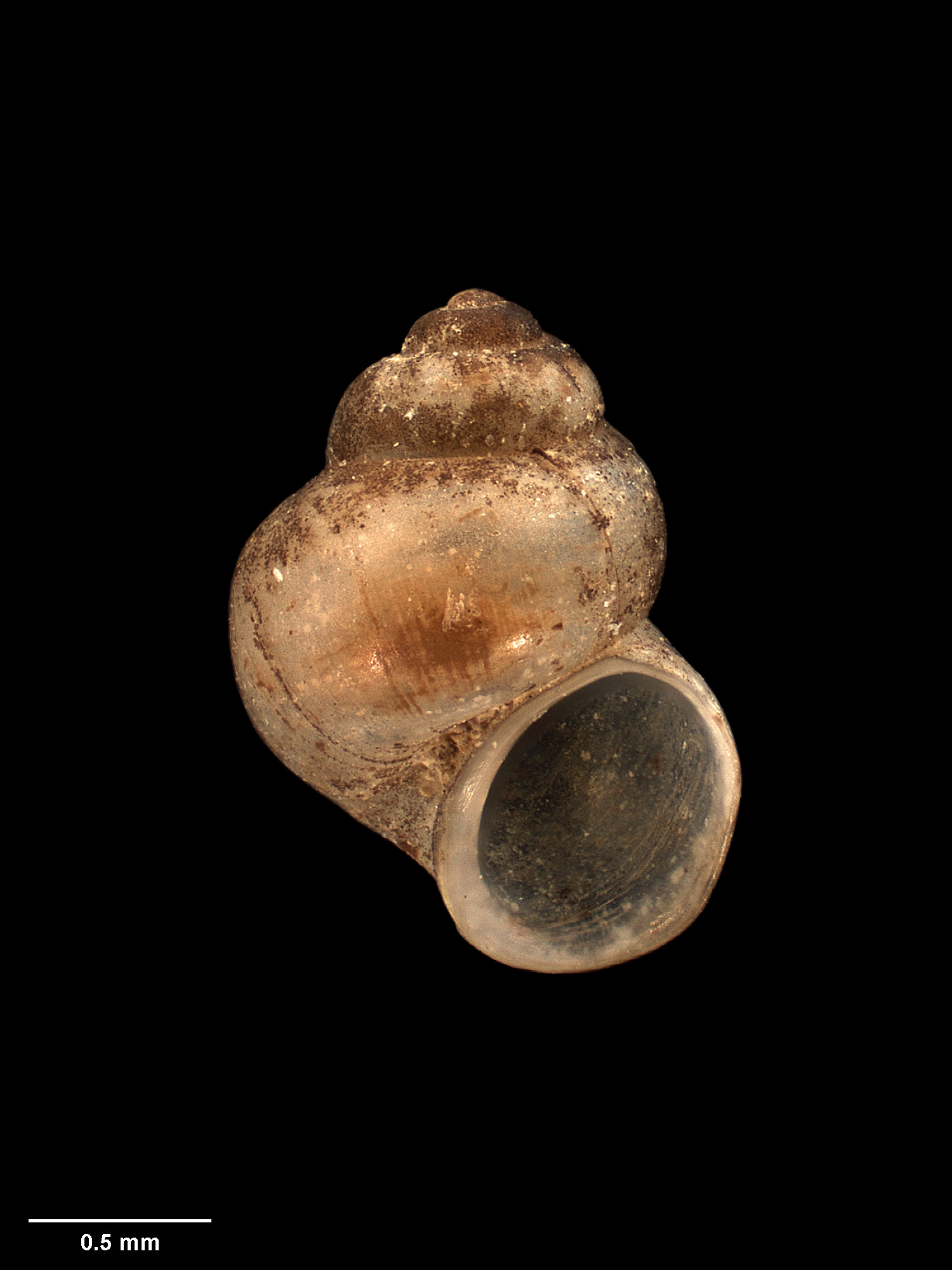
- Type specimen from Te Papa

Conservation status
- Nationally Critical (NZ TCS)

Scientific classification
- Kingdom: Animalia
- Phylum: Mollusca
- Class: Gastropoda
- Subclass: Caenogastropoda
- Order: Littorinimorpha
- Family: Tateidae
- Genus: Opacuincola
- Species: O. dulcinella

Binomial name
- Opacuincola dulcinella Martin Haase, 2008

Synonyms
- Hydrobiidae sp. 11 (M.174101)

= Opacuincola dulcinella =

Species of mollusc

Opacuincola dulcinella is a critically endangered species of freshwater snail endemic to New Zealand.

== Habitat ==
This snail has been found in two caves in very close proximity within a 1 km^{2} area in Pōhara, near Tākaka. The population trend of this snail is unknown at present but it is regarded as potentially threatened by urban development and groundwater removal and contamination.

== Conservation status ==
In November 2018 the Department of Conservation classified Opacuincola dulcinella as Nationally Critical under the New Zealand Threat Classification System. The species was judged as meeting the criteria for Nationally Critical threat status as a result of it occupying a total area of less than 1 hectare. It is found in what is regarded as one location and is also classified as Data Poor under the threat classification system.
