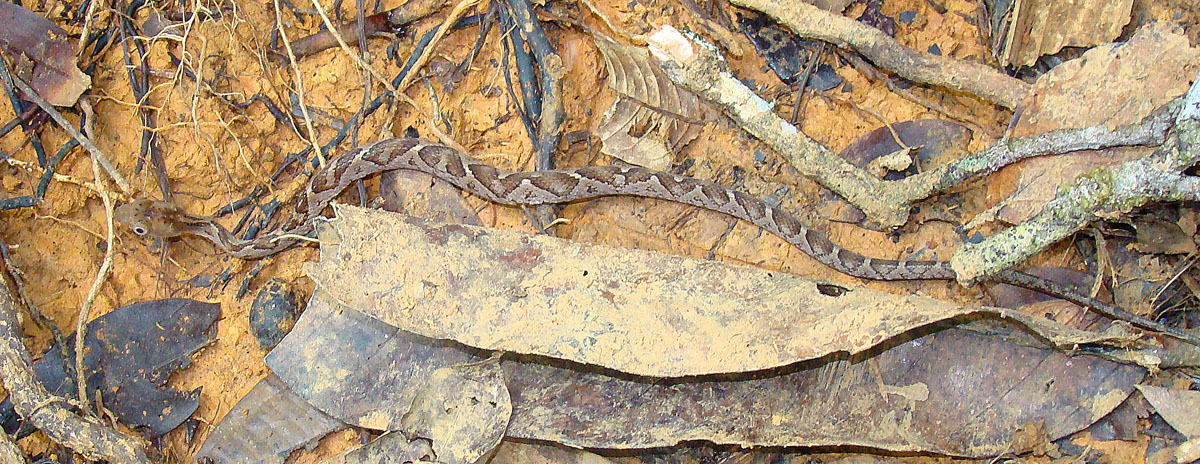

Conservation status
- Least Concern (IUCN 3.1)

Scientific classification
- Kingdom: Animalia
- Phylum: Chordata
- Class: Reptilia
- Order: Squamata
- Suborder: Serpentes
- Family: Colubridae
- Genus: Dendrophidion
- Species: D. nuchale

Binomial name
- Dendrophidion nuchale (Peters, 1863)

= Dendrophidion nuchale =

Species of snake

Dendrophidion nuchale, Peters's forest racer, is a species of non-venomous snake in the family Colubridae. The species is found in Venezuela.
