= Dendrophidion boshelli =

Conservation status
- Critically Endangered (IUCN 3.1)

Scientific classification
- Kingdom: Animalia
- Phylum: Chordata
- Class: Reptilia
- Order: Squamata
- Suborder: Serpentes
- Family: Colubridae
- Genus: Dendrophidion
- Species: D. boshelli

Binomial name
- Dendrophidion boshelli Dunn, 1944

Species of snake

Dendrophidion boshelli, Hoshell's forest racer, is a species of non-venomous snake in the family Colubridae. The species is found in Colombia.
