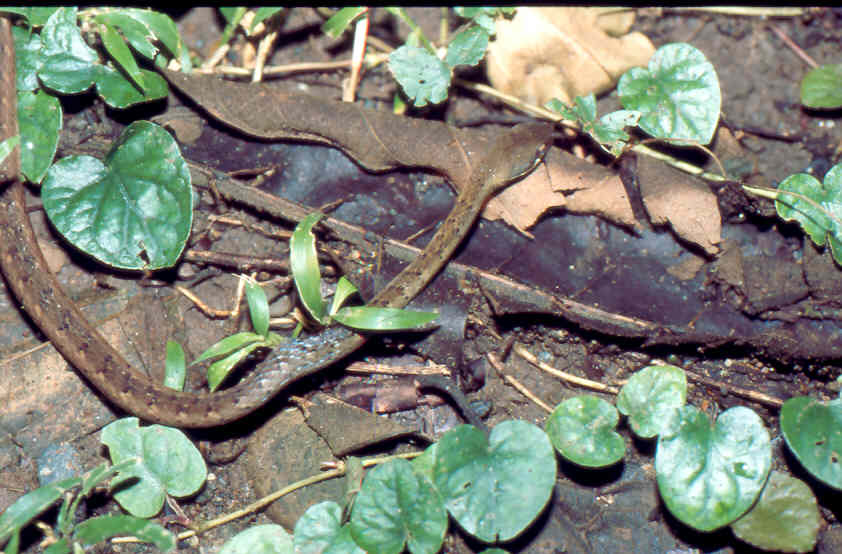
- Dendrophidion percarinatum, South American forest racer

Scientific classification
- Kingdom: Animalia
- Phylum: Chordata
- Class: Reptilia
- Order: Squamata
- Suborder: Serpentes
- Family: Colubridae
- Subfamily: Colubrinae
- Genus: Dendrophidion; Fitzinger, 1843

Species
- See text

= Dendrophidion =

Genus of snakes

Dendrophidion is a genus of New World colubrid snakes commonly referred to as forest racers.

== Geographic range ==
Species in the genus Dendrophidion range from southeastern Mexico to Bolivia.

== Species ==
The following 15 species are recognized as being valid.

- Dendrophidion apharocybe Cadle, 2012
- Dendrophidion atlantica Freire, Caramaschi & Gonçalves, 2010 - Atlantic forest racer
- Dendrophidion bivittatus (A.M.C. Duméril, Bibron & A.H.A. Duméril, 1854) – forest racer
- Dendrophidion boshelli Dunn, 1944 – Boshell's forest racer
- Dendrophidion brunneum (Günther, 1858) – Günther's forest racer
- Dendrophidion clarkii Dunn, 1933 - Clark's forest racer
- Dendrophidion crybelum Cadle, 2012
- Dendrophidion dendrophis (Schlegel, 1837) – olive forest racer
- Dendrophidion graciliverpa Cadle, 2012 - west Ecuadorian forest racer
- Dendrophidion nuchale (W. Peters, 1863) – Peters's forest racer
- Dendrophidion paucicarinatum (Cope, 1894) – Cope's forest racer
- Dendrophidion percarinatum (Cope, 1893) – South American forest racer
- Dendrophidion prolixum Cadle, 2012
- Dendrophidion rufiterminorum Cadle & Savage, 2012
- Dendrophidion vinitor H.M. Smith, 1941 – barred forest racer

Nota bene: A binomial authority in parentheses indicates that the species was originally described in a genus other than Dendrophidion.
