= Dendrophidion vinitor =

Conservation status
- Least Concern (IUCN 3.1)

Scientific classification
- Kingdom: Animalia
- Phylum: Chordata
- Class: Reptilia
- Order: Squamata
- Suborder: Serpentes
- Family: Colubridae
- Genus: Dendrophidion
- Species: D. vinitor

Binomial name
- Dendrophidion vinitor H. M. Smith, 1941

Species of snake

Dendrophidion vinitor, the barred forest racer, is a species of non-venomous snake in the family Colubridae. The species is found in Mexico, Belize, and Guatemala.
