= Dendrophidion atlantica =

Conservation status
- Data Deficient (IUCN 3.1)

Scientific classification
- Kingdom: Animalia
- Phylum: Chordata
- Class: Reptilia
- Order: Squamata
- Suborder: Serpentes
- Family: Colubridae
- Genus: Dendrophidion
- Species: D. atlantica

Binomial name
- Dendrophidion atlantica Freire, Caramaschi, & Gonçalves, 2010

Species of snake

Dendrophidion atlantica, the Atlantic forest racer, is a species of non-venomous snake in the family Colubridae. The species is found in Brazil.
