= Maje language =

Maje may refer to:

- Camana language
- Cavana language

== See also ==
- Maje (disambiguation)
