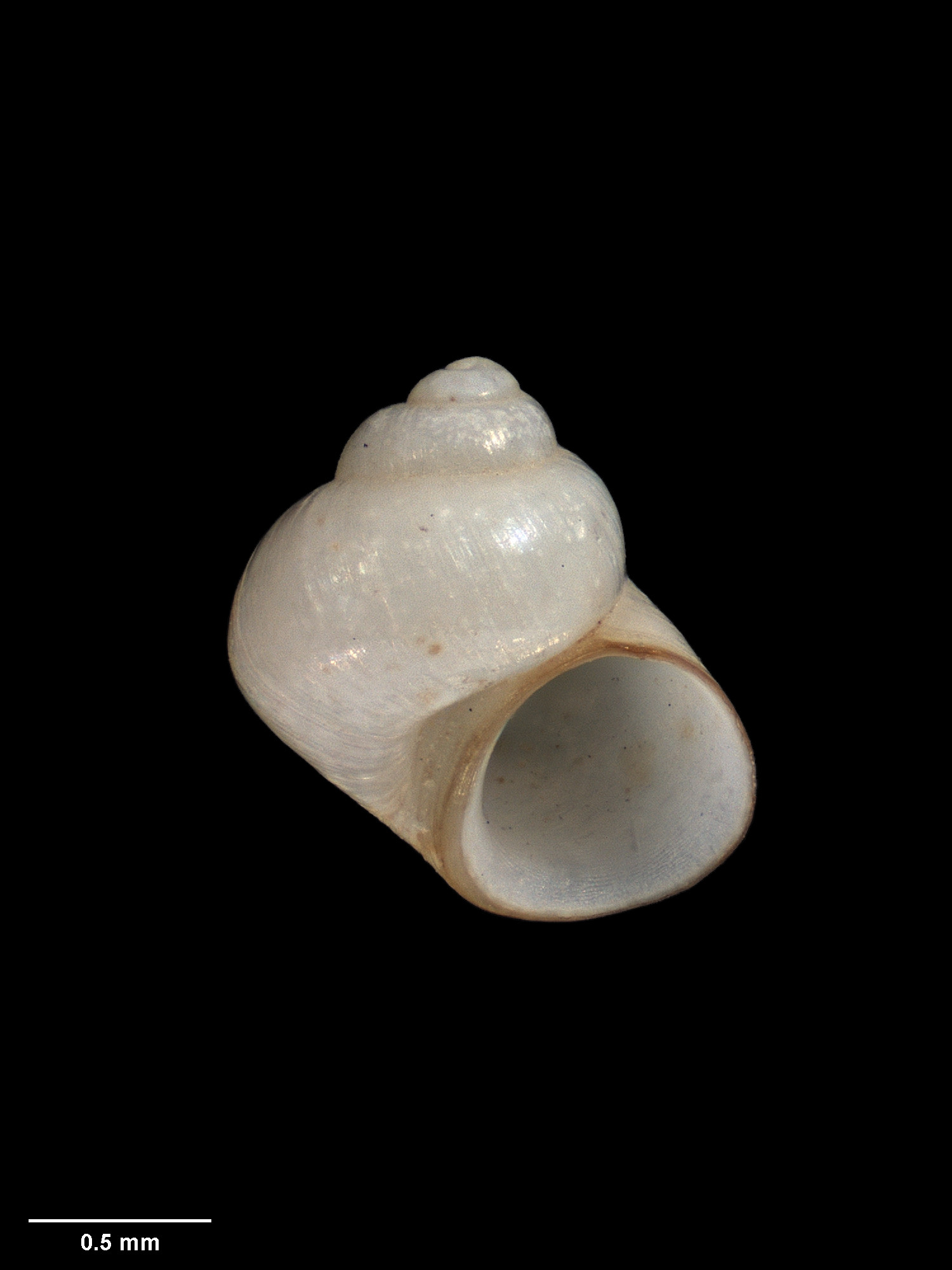
- Holotype of Opacuincola eduardstraussi.

Scientific classification
- Kingdom: Animalia
- Phylum: Mollusca
- Class: Gastropoda
- Subclass: Caenogastropoda
- Order: Littorinimorpha
- Family: Tateidae
- Genus: Opacuincola; Ponder, 1966

Species
- See text

= Opacuincola =

Genus of molluscs

Opacuincola is a genus of New Zealand freshwater snails in the family Tateidae.

The genus contains the following species:

- Opacuincola abradeta Haase, 2008
- Opacuincola caeca Ponder, 1966
- Opacuincola cervicesmadentes Haase, 2008
- Opacuincola conosimilis Haase, 2008
- Opacuincola delira Haase, 2008
- Opacuincola dulcinella Haase, 2008
- Opacuincola eduardstraussi Haase, 2008
- Opacuincola favus Haase, 2008
- Opacuincola fruticis Haase, 2008
- Opacuincola geometrica Haase, 2008
- Opacuincola gretathunbergae, Verhaege & Haase, 2021
- Opacuincola ignorata Haase, 2008
- Opacuincola johannstraussi Haase, 2008
- Opacuincola josefstraussi Haase, 2008
- Opacuincola kuscheli Climo, 1974
- Opacuincola lentesferens Haase, 2008
- Opacuincola mete Haase, 2008
- Opacuincola ngatapuna Haase, 2008
- Opacuincola ovata Haase, 2008
- Opacuincola permutata Haase, 2008
- Opacuincola piriformis Haase, 2008
- Opacuincola roscoei Haase, 2008
- Opacuincola tatakaensis Haase, 2008
- Opacuincola terraelapsus Haase, 2008
- Opacuincola turriformis Haase, 2008
