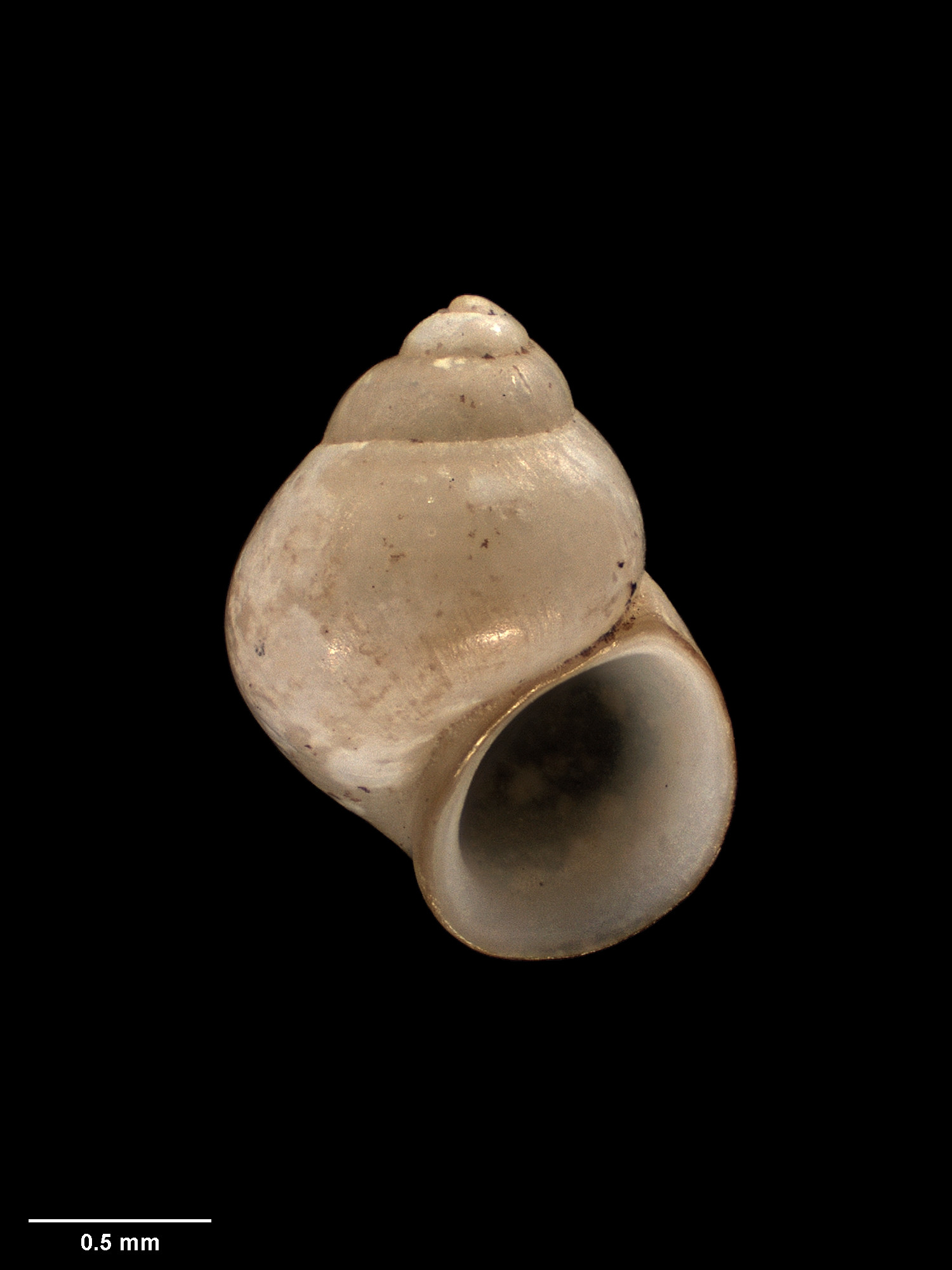
- Type specimen in Te Papa

Conservation status
- Nationally Critical (NZ TCS)

Scientific classification
- Kingdom: Animalia
- Phylum: Mollusca
- Class: Gastropoda
- Subclass: Caenogastropoda
- Order: Littorinimorpha
- Family: Tateidae
- Genus: Opacuincola
- Species: O. cervicesmadentes

Binomial name
- Opacuincola cervicesmadentes Martin Haase, 2008

Synonyms
- Hydrobiidae sp. 15 (M.174119)

= Opacuincola cervicesmadentes =

Species of gastropod

Opacuincola cervicesmadentes is a critically endangered species of freshwater snail endemic to New Zealand.

== Habitat ==
Opacuincola cervicesmadentes has been found in only one location at the Charing Cross entrance of Wet Neck Cave, west of Mangarākau and Collingwood. The population trend of this snail is unknown at present but it is regarded as potentially threatened by habitat destruction, agricultural work and caving pursuits.

== Conservation status ==
In November 2018 the Department of Conservation classified Opacuincola cervicesmadentes as Nationally Critical under the New Zealand Threat Classification System. The species was judged as meeting the criteria for Nationally Critical threat status as a result of it occupying a total area of less than 1 hectare. It is found only in one location and is also classified as Data Poor under that system.
