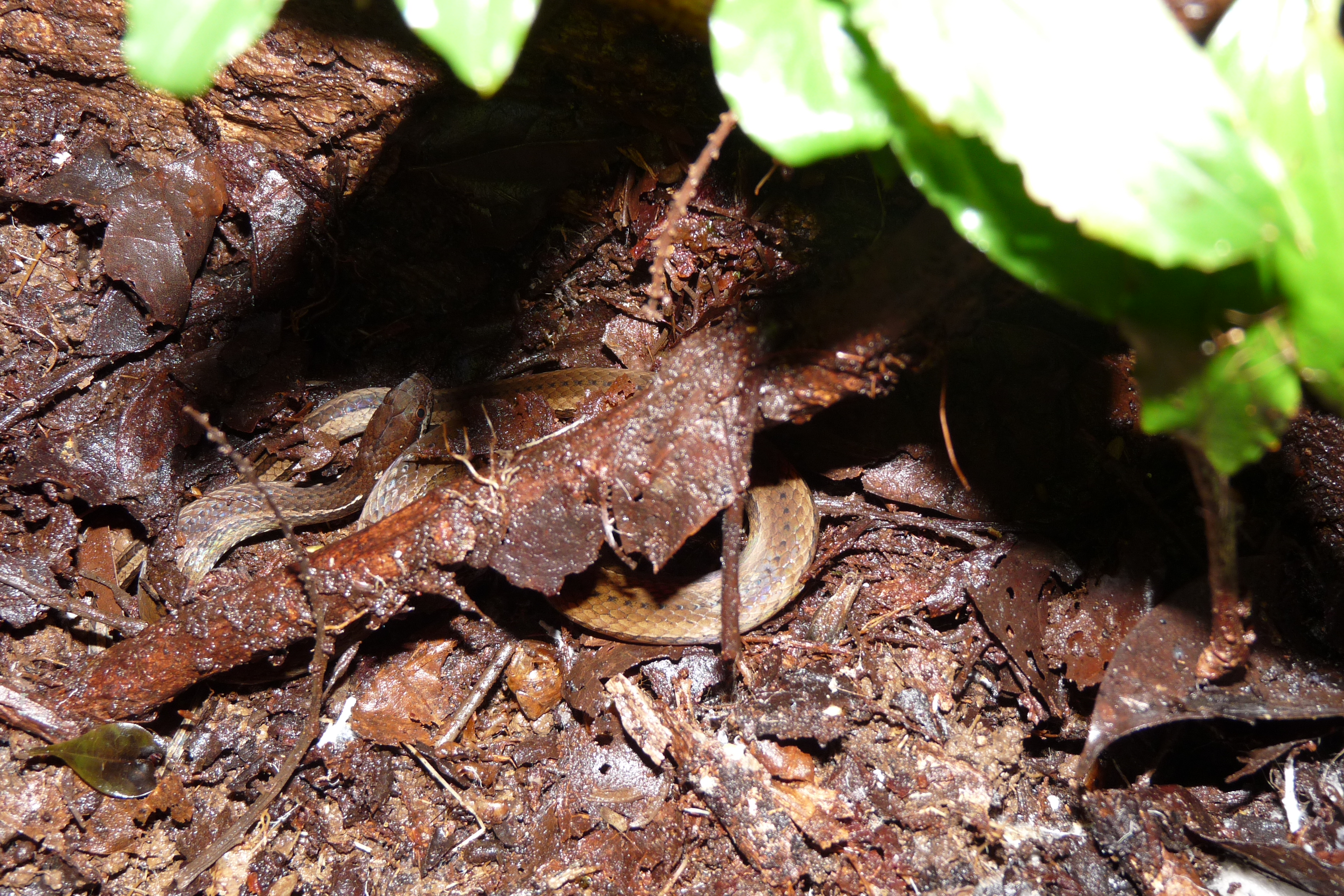

Scientific classification
- Kingdom: Animalia
- Phylum: Chordata
- Class: Reptilia
- Order: Squamata
- Suborder: Serpentes
- Family: Colubridae
- Genus: Dendrophidion
- Species: D. apharocybe

Binomial name
- Dendrophidion apharocybe Cadle, 2012

= Dendrophidion apharocybe =

Species of snake

Dendrophidion apharocybe is a species of non-venomous snake in the family Colubridae. The species is found in Costa Rica, Honduras, Nicaragua, and Panama.
