= Dendrophidion rufiterminorum =

Scientific classification
- Kingdom: Animalia
- Phylum: Chordata
- Class: Reptilia
- Order: Squamata
- Suborder: Serpentes
- Family: Colubridae
- Genus: Dendrophidion
- Species: D. rufiterminorum

Binomial name
- Dendrophidion rufiterminorum Cadle & Savage, 2012

Species of snake

Dendrophidion rufiterminorum is a species of non-venomous snake in the family Colubridae. The species is found in Belize, Guatemala, Honduras, Nicaragua, and Costa Rica. Its known range is strikingly disjunct: it occurs in northern Central America (Belize, Guatemala, northern Honduras), then drops out across most of Honduras and Nicaragua, and reappears on the Caribbean versant of southern Nicaragua and Costa Rica plus the uplands of northwestern Costa Rica, a gap of several hundred kilometers with essentially no records in between.
