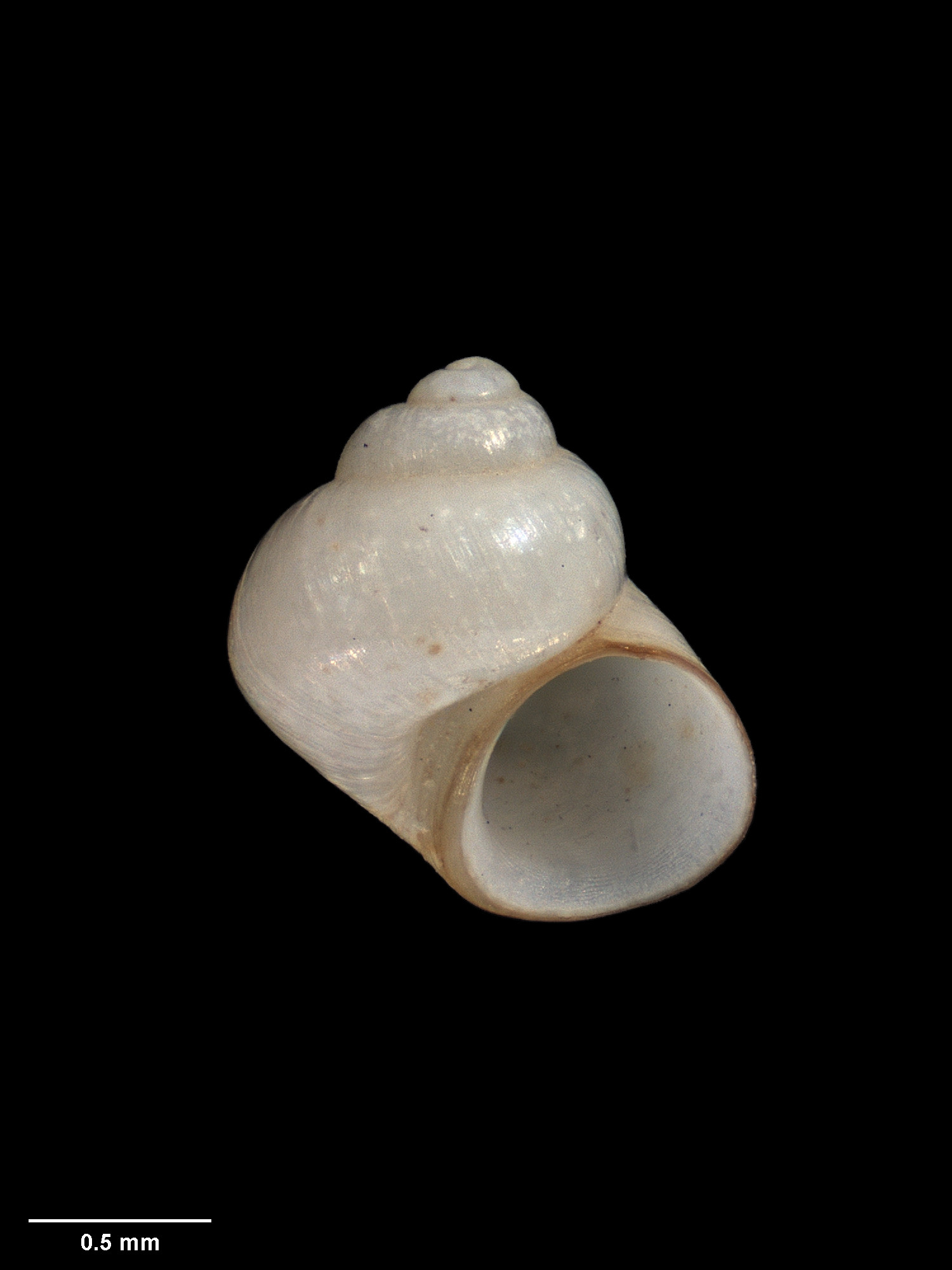

Conservation status
- Nationally Critical (NZ TCS)

Scientific classification
- Kingdom: Animalia
- Phylum: Mollusca
- Class: Gastropoda
- Subclass: Caenogastropoda
- Order: Littorinimorpha
- Family: Tateidae
- Genus: Opacuincola
- Species: O. eduardstraussi

Binomial name
- Opacuincola eduardstraussi Martin Haase, 2008

Synonyms
- Hydrobiidae sp. 13 (M.174115)

= Opacuincola eduardstraussi =

Species of mollusc endemic to New Zealand

Opacuincola eduardstraussi is a critically endangered species of fresh water snail native to New Zealand.

== Habitat ==
This snail has been found in only one location in a stream in Twinforks Cave, Paturau in the Tasman District of New Zealand. The population trend of this snail is unknown at present but it is regarded as potentially threatened by land clearance, water pollution and damage by cattle.

== Conservation status ==
In 2013 the Department of Conservation classified Opacuincola eduardstraussi as Nationally Critical under the New Zealand Threat Classification System. The species was judged as meeting the criteria for Nationally Critical threat status as a result of it occupying a total area of less than 1 hectare. It is found only in one location and is also classified as Data Poor under the threat classification system.
