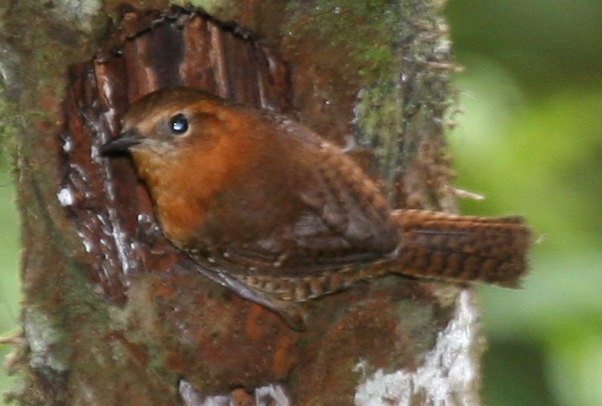

Conservation status
- Least Concern (IUCN 3.1)

Scientific classification
- Kingdom: Animalia
- Phylum: Chordata
- Class: Aves
- Order: Passeriformes
- Family: Troglodytidae
- Genus: Troglodytes
- Species: T. rufociliatus

Binomial name
- Troglodytes rufociliatus Sharpe, 1882

= Rufous-browed wren =

Species of bird

The rufous-browed wren (Troglodytes rufociliatus) is a species of bird in the family Troglodytidae. It is found in Central America from Mexico south into Nicaragua.

== Taxonomy and systematics ==
The rufous-browed wren has been treated as conspecific with the mountain wren (Troglodytes solstitialis) but DNA analysis supports that it is a species in its own right. It has four subspecies, the nominate Troglodytes rufociliatus rufociliatus, T. r. chiapensis, T. r. nannoides, and T. r. rehni.

== Description ==
The rufous-browed wren is 10 to 11.5 cm (3.9 to 4.5 in) long and weighs 11 g (0.39 oz). The adults of both sexes of the nominate subspecies have a dark brown crown, back, and rump and a warm brown tail. Their back and tail have dark bars. They have a pale buff supercilium and darker brown cheeks. Their chin is buffy and their throat and chest yellowish buff that is darker on the sides. The lower belly and vent area are barred. Compared to the nominate, T. r. chiapensis is darker above with a rufous cast to the throat and a white belly, T. r. nannoides's back is darker and the barring on the flanks heavier, and T. r. rehni is more reddish brown above and its throat more yellowish.

== Distribution and habitat ==
T. r. chiapensis is the most northerly of the rufous-browed wren subspecies; it is found in the mountains of Chiapas in southern Mexico. The nominate T. r. rufociliatus is found in central and southern Guatemala and northern El Salvador. T. r. nannoides is limited to Santa Ana Volcano in western El Salvador. T. r. rehni is found in Honduras and northwestern Nicaragua.

The rufous-browed wren inhabits humid montane forest of several types. In Guatemala it ranges in elevation from 1,700 to 3,500 m (5,600 to 11,500 ft) but has been found as low as 1,250 m (4,100 ft) in Nicaragua.

== Behavior ==
=== Feeding ===
The rufous-browed wren usually forages in pairs, and usually near the ground in thick foliage but also in aerial epiphytes. It has been recorded taking caterpillars but further details of its diet are lacking.

=== Breeding ===
The rufous-browed wren's nesting season appears to span from late April to early July. Three nests have been found, all of them in Guatemala. They were cups constructed of dry grass and pine needles. Two were in cavities in tree stumps and the third in a hole in the ground. The female alone incubated the eggs. Unusually for a wren, the male sometimes fed the female on the nest.

=== Vocalization ===
The rufous-browed wren's song is "a varied, scratchy warble running into tinkling trill" and its call "a loud nasal 'zhweet'".

== Status ==
The IUCN has assessed the rufous-browed wren as being of Least Concern. Though it has a somewhat restricted range, it is "common in many areas where habitat [is] undisturbed."
