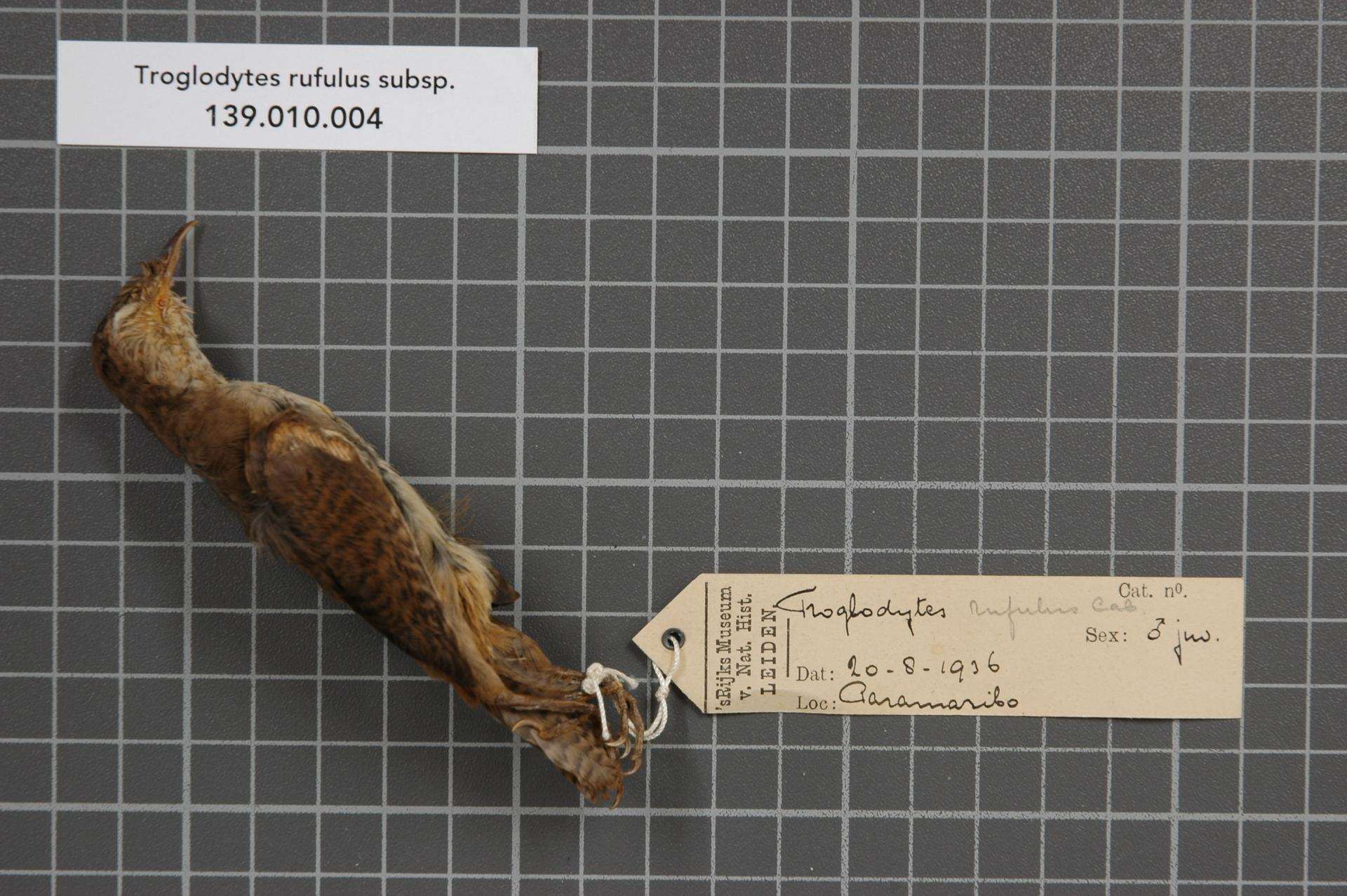
- ‘’Tepui wren’’

Conservation status
- Least Concern (IUCN 3.1)

Scientific classification
- Kingdom: Animalia
- Phylum: Chordata
- Class: Aves
- Order: Passeriformes
- Family: Troglodytidae
- Genus: Troglodytes
- Species: T. rufulus

Binomial name
- Troglodytes rufulus Cabanis, 1849

= Tepui wren =

Species of bird

The tepui wren (Troglodytes rufulus) is a species of bird in the family Troglodytidae. It is found in Brazil, Guyana, and Venezuela, where it inhabits high tablelands called tepuis.

== Taxonomy and systematics ==
The tepui wren has often been treated a subspecies of mountain wren (Troglodytes solstitialis). The South American Classification Committee of the American Ornithological Society (SACC/AOS) considers those two, ochraceous wren (T. achraceus), rufous-browed wren (T. rufociliatus), and Santa Marta wren (T. monticola) to be a superspecies.

The tepui wren has six subspecies:

- T. r. rufulus Cabanis (1849)
- T. r. fulvigularis Zimmer & Phelps (1945)
- T. r. yavii Phelps & Phelps Jr. (1949)
- T. r. duidae Chapman (1929)
- T. r. wetmorei Phelps & Phelps Jr. (1955)
- T. r. marahuacae Phelps Jr. & Aveledo (1984)

== Description ==
The nominate subspecies of tepui wren is 11.5 to 12 cm (4.5 to 4.7 in) long and weighs 13 to 18 g (0.46 to 0.63 oz). The adult's crown and upperparts are chestnut brown that is slightly redder on the lower back and rump. Its tail is dark reddish brown with thin blackish bars. It has a yellowish buff supercilium and a dark brown streak behind the eye. The throat and breast are yellowish buff; the sides, flanks, and lower belly are reddish brown; and the vent area is buffy brown with dark brown bars. The juvenile is darker with scaly underparts. T. r. fulvigularis is darker and less reddish than the nominate. T. r. yavii has white underparts. T. r. duidae has whitish underparts and the bars on its tail are more pronounced. T. r. wetmorei is the most similar to the nominate, differing only by having gray central underparts. T. r. marahuacae is similar to wetmorei but is smaller and the entire belly is gray.

== Distribution and habitat ==
The subspecies of tepui wren are distributed thus:

- T. r. rufulus, Mount Roraima and Uei-tepui at the Venezuela-Guyana-Brazil border
- T. r. fulvigularis, southeastern Bolívar state, southeastern Venezuela
- T. r. yavii, northern Amazonas state, south central Venezuela
- T. r. duidae, central Amazonas and southern Bolívar states, southern Venezuela
- T. r. wetmorei, Cerro de la Neblina in southern Amazonas state, venezuela, and perhaps adjoining northern Brazil
- T. r. marahuacae, central Amazonas state, southern Venezuela

The tepui wren inhabits humid forest, forest edges, and bushland on isolated flat-topped mountains called tepuis. In elevation it ranges from 1,000 to 2,800 m (3,300 to 9,200 ft) but is mostly found in the narrower band between 1,600 and 2,400 m (5,200 and 7,900 ft).

== Behavior ==
=== Feeding ===
The tepui wren primarily forages on the ground or in low vegetation. Its diet has not been documented.

=== Breeding ===
No information about the tepui wren's breeding phenology has been published.

=== Vocalization ===
The tepui wren's song is "a series of high, thin whistled twitters" that may run together or be in separate phrases.

== Status ==
The IUCN has assessed the tepui wren as being of Least Concern. Though its population has not been quantified, it is locally common and many of the inhabited tepuis are protected preserves.
