= Dendrophidion bivittatus =

Conservation status
- Least Concern (IUCN 3.1)

Scientific classification
- Domain: Eukaryota
- Kingdom: Animalia
- Phylum: Chordata
- Class: Reptilia
- Order: Squamata
- Suborder: Serpentes
- Family: Colubridae
- Genus: Dendrophidion
- Species: D. bivittatus

Binomial name
- Dendrophidion bivittatus (Duméril, Bibron & Duméril, 1854)

Synonyms
- Leptophis bivittatus Duméril, Bibron & Duméril, 1854; Tropidonotus subradiatus Jan, 1865; Herpetodryas tetrataenia Günther, 1872

Species of snake

Dendrophidion bivittatus, commonly known as the forest racer, is a snake of the colubrid family.

== Geographic distribution ==
The snake is found in Colombia, Ecuador and Peru.
