= Mental gland =

Body part in some animals that produces chemicals used for communation

A mental gland is a part of the body found in many species of amphibians and reptiles. Mental glands produce chemicals that conspecific animals use to communicate.

== Location ==
The mental glands appear in pairs, one on each side of the head. They are located behind the end of the mandible.

== Function ==
Mental glands produce hormones that are secreted through the skin. The secretions from mental glands have been implicated in mate selection, species identification, and other functions.

Scientists believe that the head bobbing behavior observed in turtles encountering another member of their own species may serve to disperse the chemicals from the mental glands through the air. Certain courtship behaviors observed in salamanders, such as snapping, only appear in salamanders that have mental glands, so scientists believe they are also meant to spread the chemicals through the air.

== Origins and evolution ==
Not all reptiles and amphibians have mental glands. It is not unusual for some species in the same family to have mental glands while others do not.

In 2021, one team of scientists found that most turtles that have mental glands are aquatic. They concluded that mental glands developed once in turtles, in the ancestor of the family Testudinoidea, and that all turtles that have mental glands develop them from tissue of homologous origin. They inferred that turtles that do not have mental glands lost them.
