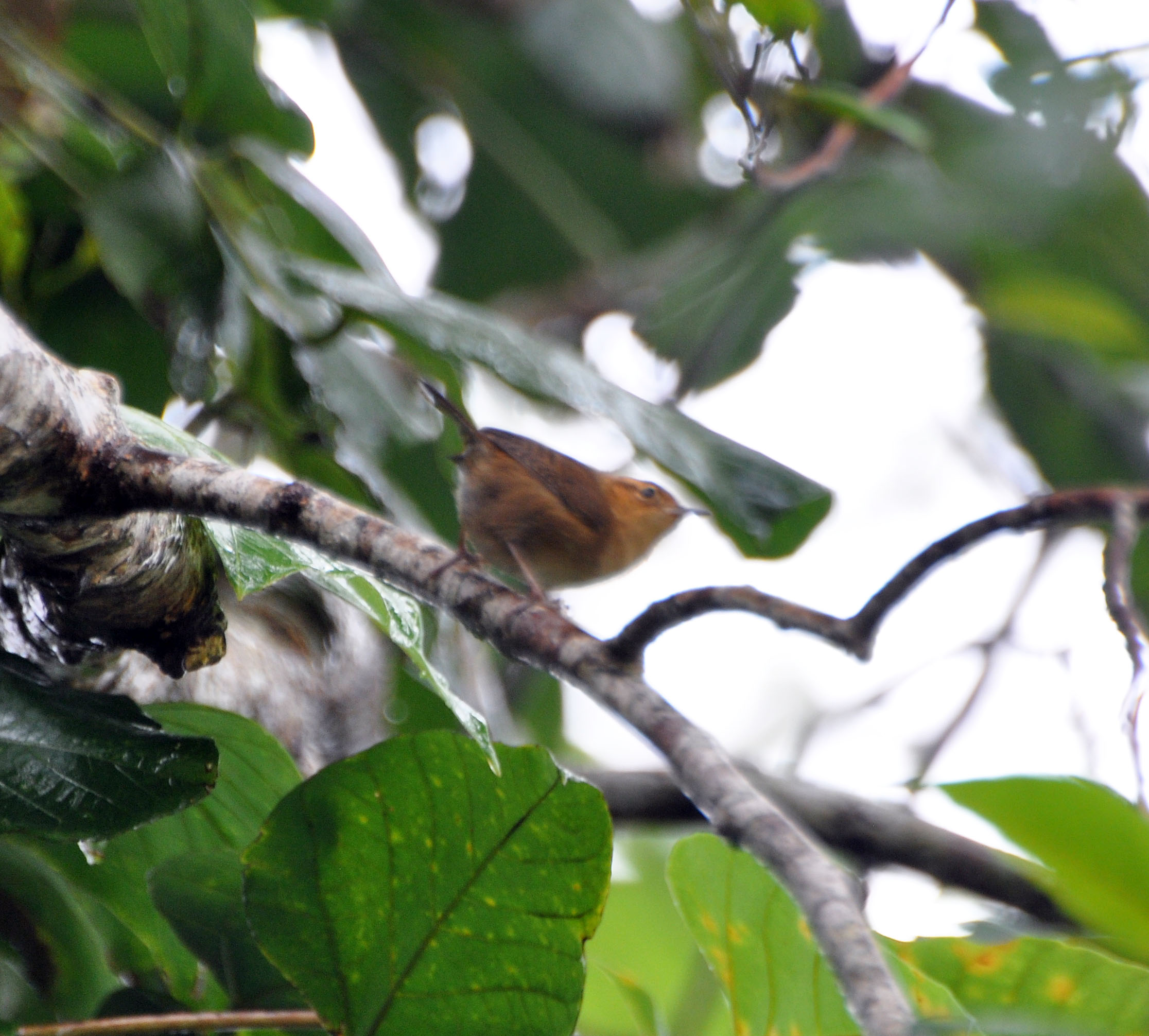
- In Costa Rica

Conservation status
- Least Concern (IUCN 3.1)

Scientific classification
- Domain: Eukaryota
- Kingdom: Animalia
- Phylum: Chordata
- Class: Aves
- Order: Passeriformes
- Family: Troglodytidae
- Genus: Troglodytes
- Species: T. ochraceus

Binomial name
- Troglodytes ochraceus Ridgway, 1882

= Ochraceous wren =

Species of bird

The ochraceous wren (Troglodytes ochraceus) is a small songbird of the wren family. It is a resident breeding species in Costa Rica, Panama, and Colombia.

== Taxonomy and systematics ==
The ochraceous wren was previously considered to be a subspecies of mountain wren (Troglodytes solstitialis). The International Ornithological Committee (IOC) recognizes two subspecies, the nominate Troglodytes ochraceus ochraceus and T. o. festinus. The Cornell Lab of Ornithology's Birds of the World and the Clements taxonomy split T. o. ligea from the nominate subspecies.

== Description ==
The adult ochraceous wren is 9.5 to 10 cm (3.7 to 3.9 in) long and weighs 8 to 10 g (0.28 to 0.35 oz). The nominate subspecies sensu stricto has a rich medium brown crown and back with a rufous cast to the rump. The tail is brown with blackish bars. It has a bold yellowish buff supercilium that extends to the nape. Its chin, throat, and upper chest are buffy brown, its lower breast and upper belly buffy white, and its flanks and lower belly darker buffy brown. T. o. ligea, when treated separately, is duller than the nominate and has a heavier bill. T. o. festinus is smaller and lighter below than the nominate and also has a larger bill.

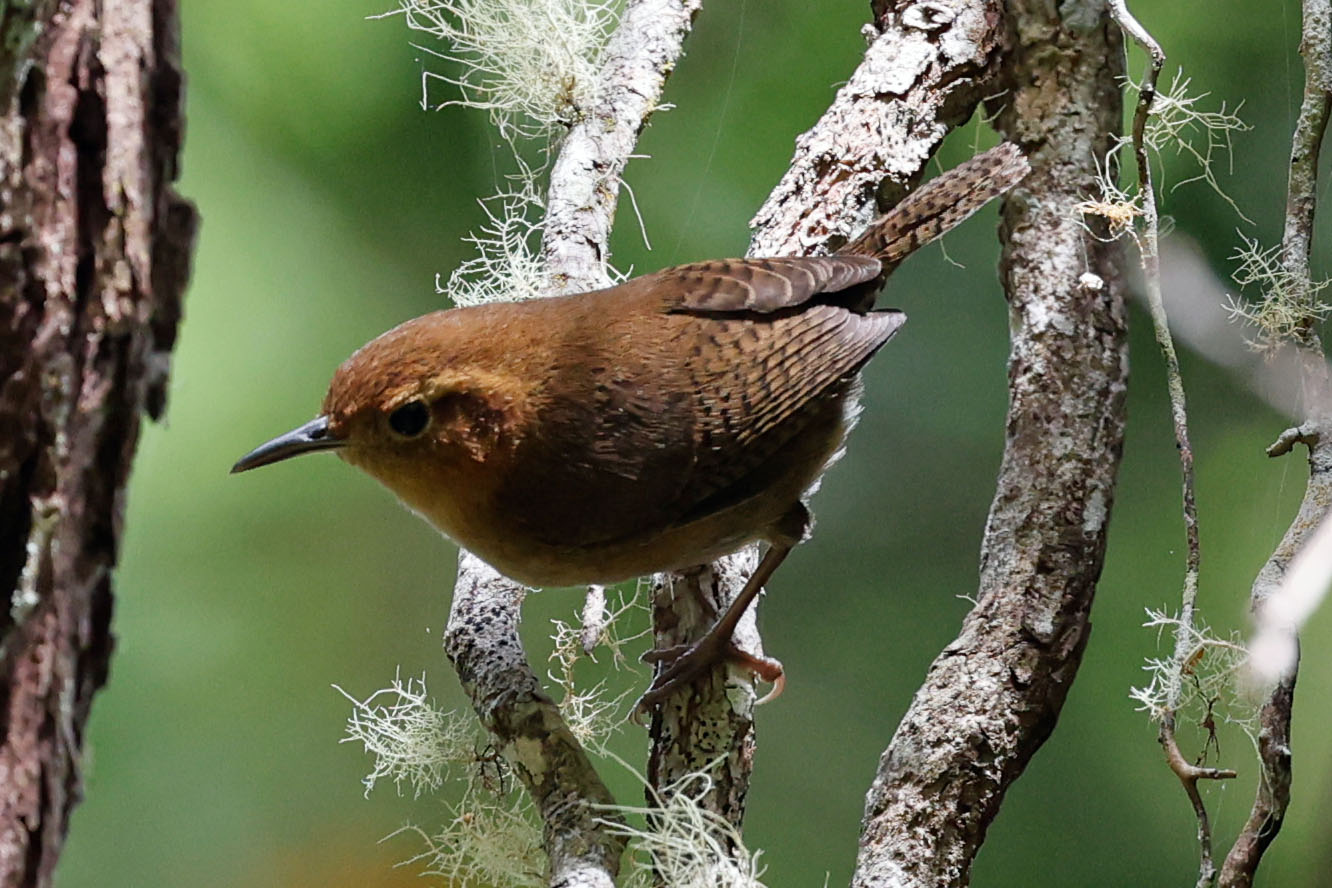
Near San Gerardo in Costa Rica, 20 March 2024.

== Distribution and habitat ==
According to the IOC, the nominate subspecies of ochraceous wren is found in the Costa Rica highlands from the Tilarán Mountains to the Talamanca ranges and in western and central Panama. Cornell and Clements treat the Panamanian population as T. o. ligea and confine T. o. ochraceus to Costa Rica. All three place T. o. festinus in eastern Panama; Cornell, Clements, and the South American Classification Committee of the American Ornithological Society (SACC/AOS) note its occurrence in adjacent northwestern Colombia as well.

The ochraceous wren primarily inhabits wet epiphyte-laden montane forest, and also semi-open areas such as woodland edges, tall second growth, and pastures with trees. In elevation it usually ranges between 900 and 2,450 m (2,950 and 8,040 ft) but has occasionally been recorded as low as 600 m (2,000 ft) and as high as 3,000 m (9,800 ft).

== Behavior ==
=== Feeding ===
The ochraceous wren mostly forages on mossy tree trunks and in epiphytes. Its prey is small invertebrates.

=== Breeding ===
The ochraceous wren's nesting period apparently spans from April to July in Costa Rica. Skutch (1960) found three nests; all were constructed in a mass of epiphytes and debris on a hanging, partially detached, branch 40 to 50 ft (12 to 15 m) above ground. Families of two adults and two young have been observered.

=== Vocalization ===
The ochraceous wren's song is "a rather subdued medley of varied liquid trills and high, thin slurred whistles" and it calls "a rolling, thin high-pitched 'peeer' or 'peeew' and low, weak 'churr'."

== Status ==
The IUCN has assessed the ochraceous wren as being of Least Concern. Though its population has not been quantified, it is believed to be fairly common, and it occurs in several national parks and biological reserves.
