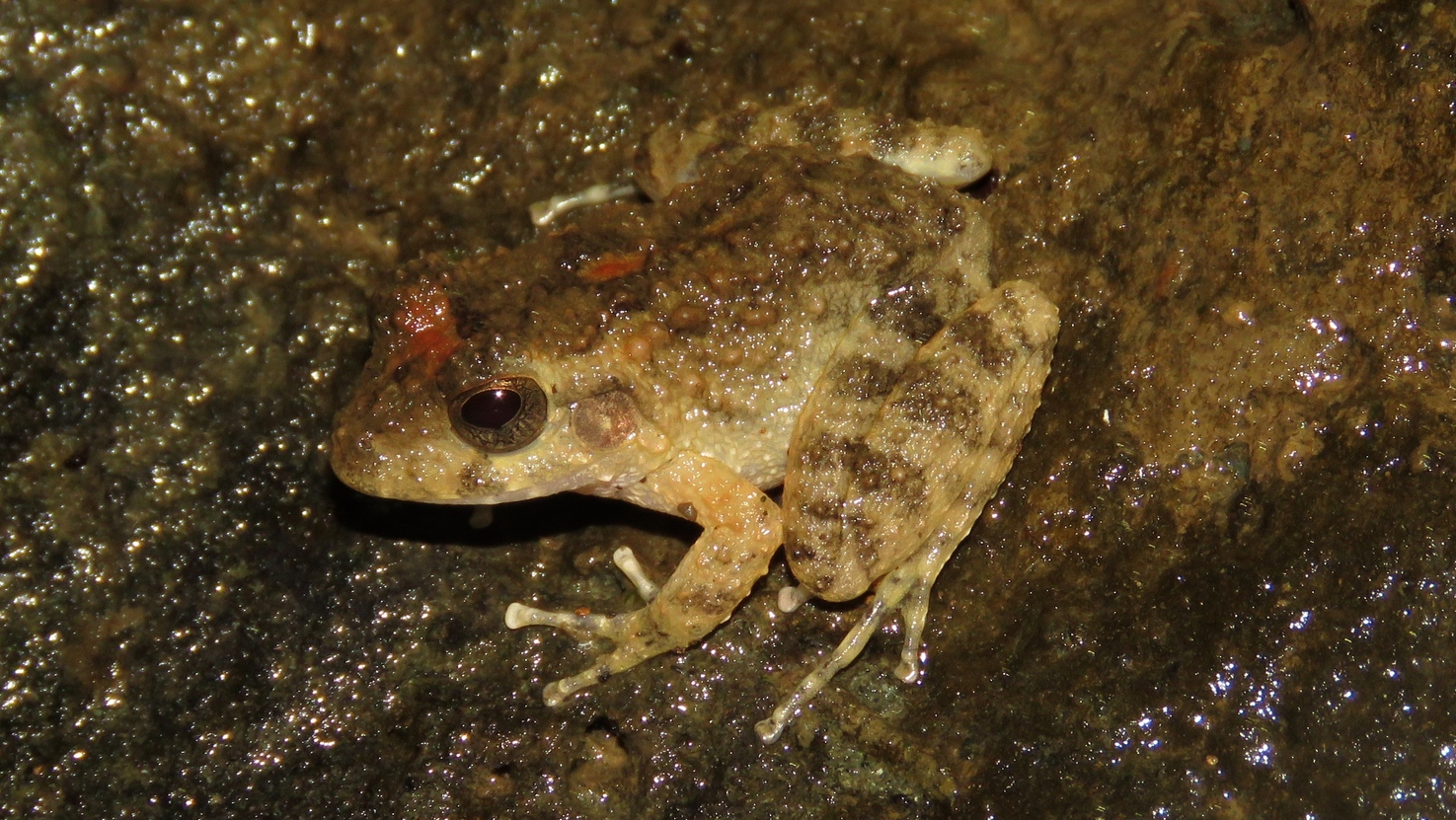
- C. taurus in Golfito, Puntarenas, Costa Rica

Conservation status
- Endangered (IUCN 3.1)

Scientific classification
- Kingdom: Animalia
- Phylum: Chordata
- Class: Amphibia
- Order: Anura
- Family: Craugastoridae
- Genus: Craugastor
- Species: C. taurus

Binomial name
- Craugastor taurus (Taylor, 1958)

Synonyms
- Eleutherodactylus taurus Taylor, 1958

= Craugastor taurus =

Species of amphibian

Craugastor taurus is a species of frog in the family Craugastoridae. It is found in the Golfo Dulce region of southern Costa Rica and adjacent western Panama. It is sometimes known as the Golfito robber frog.

== Etymology ==
The specific name taurus is derived from the Latin word for "bull".

== Description ==
Craugastor taurus is a large, somewhat toad-like frog. Female Craugastor taurus can grow as large as 80 mm (3.1 in) in snout–vent length, whereas males are smaller, up to 42 mm (1.7 in) SVL. Dorsum is bumpy and grey or brown in colour, with darker blotches. Arms and legs have dark bars. Feet have extensive webbing. Males have vocal sac and proportionally larger tympanum.

== Habitat and conservation ==
Natural habitats of Craugastor taurus are rocky areas of streams in humid lowland forests at elevations between 25 and 525 m (82 and 1,722 ft) above sea level. It can be found on rocks or in the debris, roots, and vegetation along the stream banks. It is a nocturnal species.

This species was formerly abundant. However, between 2000 and 2008, only one frog has been observed, despite intensive field work. The reasons of the decline are unknown, but chytridiomycosis (or similar disease) is a potential culprit. Outside protected areas, habitat loss remains a threat. Fortunately, in 2014 two populations were reported from Punta Banco (Golfito canton). The species remains absent from the known historic sites. A possible explanation of its persistence in Punta Banco is the drier climate in the area, which is less conducive for outbreaks of chytridiomycosis, compared to the historic range further north.

Map showing Punta Banco, the location of remaining populations of Craugastor taurus
