= Serranía de Majé =

Mountain range in Panama

- Location within Panama

Highest point
- Peak: Cerro Chucantí
- Elevation: 1,489 m (4,885 ft)
- Coordinates: 8°54′55″N 78°38′49″W

Geography
- Country: Panama
- Biome: Chocó–Darién moist forests, Eastern Panamanian montane forests

Serranía de Majé is a mountain range located in Panama which extends from Panama Province to the zone that borders Darién Province. It lies 100 km east of Panama City. It is formerly known as the Serranía de Cañazas. It is bounded on the west and north by Chepo River lowlands, on the east by the Chucunaque River lowlands, and on the south by the Pacific Ocean. The highest point in the Cerro Chucantí (1,489 m).

== Ecology ==
Most of the range is covered by lowland and submontane evergreen forest, with cloud forest at the highest elevations. The isolated range has been designated an Important Bird Area (IBA) by BirdLife International because it supports significant populations of great curassows, russet-crowned quail-doves, violet-capped hummingbirds, great green macaws, beautiful treerunners, olive-sided flycatchers, ochraceous wrens, varied solitaires, Tacarcuna chlorospinguses and golden-winged warblers. It contains the Majé Hydrological Reserve which is a separate IBA.
