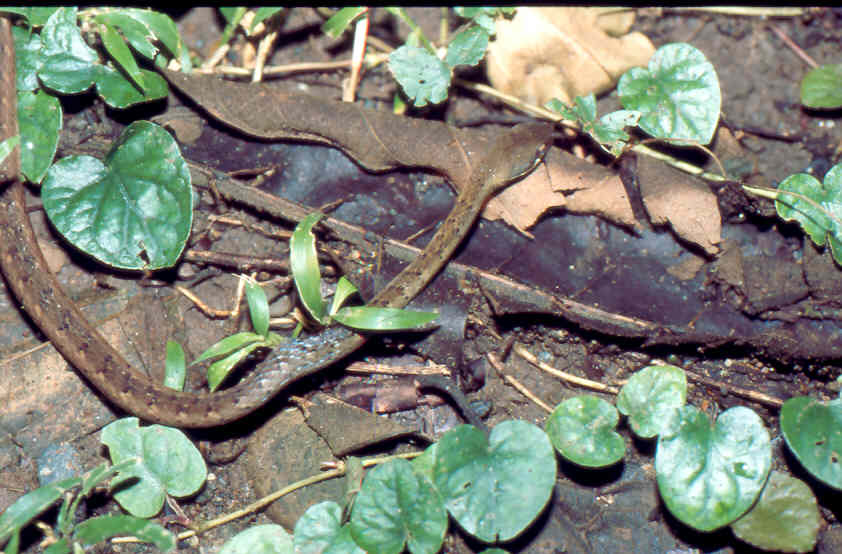

Conservation status
- Least Concern (IUCN 3.1)

Scientific classification
- Kingdom: Animalia
- Phylum: Chordata
- Class: Reptilia
- Order: Squamata
- Suborder: Serpentes
- Family: Colubridae
- Genus: Dendrophidion
- Species: D. percarinatum

Binomial name
- Dendrophidion percarinatum (Cope, 1893)

Synonyms
- Drymobius percarinatus Cope, 1893; Dendrophidion percarinatus (Cope, 1893)

= Dendrophidion percarinatum =

Species of snake

Dendrophidion percarinatum, commonly known as the South American forest racer, is a snake in the family Colubridae. It is found in forests in Central and northern South America.

== Description ==
Dendrophidion percarinatum is a forest snake that lives on the forest floor. Its size varies from 40.1 to 85.2 cm (15.8 to 33.5 in). It has 147 to 170 ventral scales, 84 to 106 dorsal scales, and 133 to 164 subcaudal scales. One main characteristic is the presence of a divided anal plate. Its coloration is dark brown or gray dorsally, with a lighter, cream color on its underbelly. Additionally, on its dorsal side, it has black cross bars with light dots that cover most of the snake's body.

== Geographic distribution ==
Dendrophidion percarinatum is found in Honduras, Nicaragua, Costa Rica, Panama, northern Colombia and northwestern Venezuela, with the population in Venezuela believed to be a distinct population from the rest of the range. It is normally found at elevations <1000 m but has been found up to 1200 m in southwestern Costa Rica.

== Behavior ==
Dendrophidion percarinatum is a diurnal and semi-arboreal snake that primarily consumes frogs, lizards, and other small animals that live in the leaf litter present on the forest floor.

== Reproduction ==
Dendrophidion percarinatum is oviparous, and has an average clutch size of 3 to 6 eggs.
