= Majé Hydrological Reserve =

Protected area of Panama

- Reserva Hidrologica Majé
- IUCN category V (protected landscape/seascape)
- Location within Panama
- Location: Panamá Province, Panama
- Nearest city: Panama City
- Coordinates: 08°58′59″N 78°43′59″W
- Area: 187.39 km^{2} (72.35 sq mi)
- Established: 1996

The Majé Hydrological Reserve is an 18,000 ha protected area in Panama. It encompasses the forested watershed of the Majé River, which flows into Lake Bayano. The reserve lies within the Serranía de Majé, an isolated mountain range on the Pacific slope of the Panama isthmus and has a high point of 1,074 m elevation. It has been designated an Important Bird Area (IBA) by BirdLife International because it supports significant populations of great curassows and great green macaws.

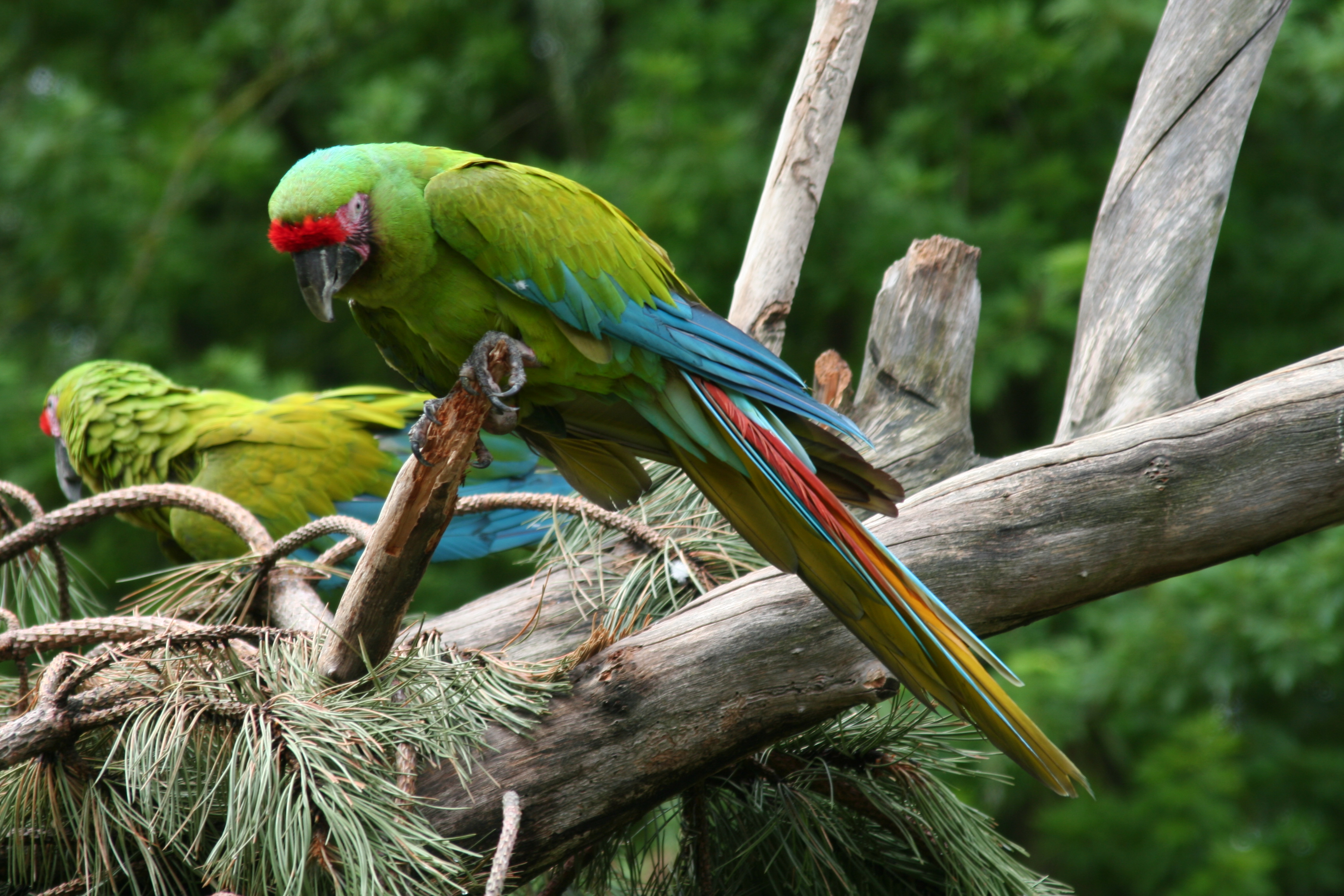
Great green macaws
