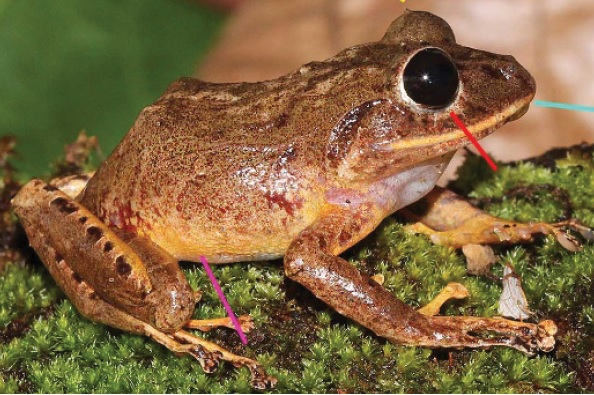

Scientific classification
- Kingdom: Animalia
- Phylum: Chordata
- Class: Amphibia
- Order: Anura
- Clade: Brachycephaloidea
- Family: Craugastoridae
- Genus: Pristimantis
- Species: P. gretathunbergae

Binomial name
- Pristimantis gretathunbergae Mebert, González-Pinzón, Miranda, Griffith, Vesely, Schmid & Batista, 2022

= Pristimantis gretathunbergae =

Species of frog in the family Craugastoridae

Pristimantis gretathunbergae, dubbed Greta Thunberg's rainfrog, is a species of frog in the family Strabomantidae, native to Panama. It is named in honor of Greta Thunberg, a climate activist. It lives in small pools of water held in bromeliads growing on the cloud forests of Mount Chucantí and other mountains of the Darién Gap, and of central Panama.

The type specimen was discovered by an international team of biologists led by Abel Batista, from Panama, and Konrad Mebert from Switzerland in Cerro Chucantí, a private reserve located in the province of Darién. The specimen was named after Greta Thunberg, an activist, due to their natural environment facing changes with the climate, endangering the organism. In appearance, this species has dark irises, which is distinct from other species which have paler irises. Additionally, they have a pale light-colored upper lip, and a groin coloration which varies from red to a cream color. At night, the frog is known to be seen 0.5 to 3 meter above the ground, while in daytime it spends most of its time on bromeliads, where it engages in vocalization.
