= List of near threatened birds =

- Extinct in the wild (EW): 5 species
- Critically endangered (CR): 216 species
- Endangered (EN): 372 species
- Vulnerable (VU): 670 species
- Near threatened (NT): 967 species
- Least concern (LC): 8,767 species
- Data deficient (DD): 37 species
Avian species (IUCN, 2025-2)
- 11,198 extant species have been evaluated
- 11,161 of those are fully assessed (Note: excludes data deficient evaluations.)
- 9,734 are not threatened at present (Note: NT and LC.)
- 1,427 to 1,464 are threatened (Note: Threatened comprises CR, EN and VU. Upper estimate additionally includes DD.)
- 169 to 187 are extinct or extinct in the wild:
  - 164 extinct (EX) species (Note: Chart omits extinct (EX) species)
  - 5 extinct in the wild (EW)
  - 18 possibly extinct [CR(PE)]

Near threatened (NT) species do not currently qualify for critically endangered (CR), endangered (EN) or vulnerable (VU) status, but are likely to qualify for a threatened category in the near future, or are already close to qualifying.

As of December 2020, the International Union for Conservation of Nature (IUCN) lists 1001 near threatened avian species. Of all evaluated avian species, 9.1% are listed as near threatened. No subpopulations of birds have been evaluated by the IUCN.

This is a complete list of near threatened avian species evaluated by the IUCN. Where possible common names for taxa are given while links point to the scientific name used by the IUCN.

== Rheiformes ==
Rheas

- Greater rhea

== Apterygiformes ==
Kiwis

- Little spotted kiwi

== Tinamiformes ==
Tinamous

- Choco tinamou
- Yellow-legged tinamou
- Pale-browed tinamou
- White-throated tinamou
- Great tinamou
- Solitary tinamou

== Anseriformes ==
Ducks, geese, swans, and screamers

- Andaman teal
- Auckland teal
- Brown teal
- Ferruginous duck
- Nene
- Blue-winged goose
- West Indian whistling-duck
- Marbled duck
- Black scoter
- Common eider
- Bronze-winged duck

== Galliformes ==
Landfowl

=== Cracidae ===
Chachalacas, guans, and currassows

- Yellow-knobbed curassow
- Bearded guan
- White-throated piping-guan

=== Phasianidae ===
Pheasants and allies

- Congo peafowl
- Rock partridge
- Red-legged partridge
- Orange-necked partridge
- White-necklaced partridge
- Chestnut-breasted partridge
- Ferruginous partridge
- Japanese quail
- Salvadori's pheasant
- Swinhoe's pheasant
- Caucasian grouse
- Ocellated turkey
- Swamp francolin
- Mountain peacock-pheasant
- Harwood's spurfowl
- Long-billed partridge
- Chinese grouse
- Sabah partridge
- Greater prairie-chicken

=== Odontophoridae ===
New World quails

- Northern bobwhite
- Salle's quail
- Venezuelan wood quail

=== Megapodiidae ===
Megapodes

- Biak scrubfowl
- Micronesian megapode

== Caprimulgiformes ==
Nightjars

- Chuck-will's-widow
- Eastern whip-poor-will
- Least poorwill

== Podargiformes ==
Frogmouths

- Gould's frogmouth
- Solomons frogmouth

== Apodiformes ==
Hummingbirds and swifts

=== Apodidae ===
Swifts

- Mascarene swiftlet
- Dark-rumped swift
- Philippine spinetail

=== Trochilidae ===
Hummingbirds

- White-tufted sunbeam
- Hooded visorbearer
- White-tailed sabrewing
- Little woodstar
- Tres Marias hummingbird
- Mexican sheartail
- White-tailed hummingbird
- Pirre hummingbird
- Hoary puffleg
- Marvellous spatuletail
- Dot-eared coquette
- Bee hummingbird
- Perijá metaltail
- Black-backed thornbill
- Chestnut-bellied hummingbird
- Rufous hummingbird

== Musophagiformes ==
Turacos

- Bannerman's turaco
- Fischer's turaco
- Ruspoli's turaco

== Otidiformes ==
Bustards

- Arabian bustard
- Kori bustard
- Blue korhaan
- Little brown bustard
- Denham's bustard
- Little bustard

== Cuculiformes ==
Cuckoos

- Biak coucal
- Whistling long-tailed cuckoo
- Bahama lizard-cuckoo
- Chestnut-vented coua
- Moustached hawk-cuckoo
- Black-bellied malkoha
- Chestnut-bellied malkoha

== Columbiformes ==
Doves and pigeons

- Madagascar blue pigeon
- Comoro blue pigeon
- Nicobar pigeon
- Whistling fruit dove
- Laurel pigeon
- Island bronze-naped pigeon
- Andaman wood pigeon
- Comoro olive pigeon
- Chestnut-bellied imperial pigeon
- Timor imperial pigeon
- Finsch's imperial pigeon
- Goliath imperial pigeon
- Mindoro imperial pigeon
- Enggano imperial pigeon
- Grey imperial pigeon
- Pink-bellied imperial pigeon
- Pink-headed imperial pigeon
- Yellowish imperial pigeon
- Luzon bleeding-heart
- Crested quail-dove
- Sclater's crowned pigeon
- Victoria crowned pigeon
- Tolima dove
- White-throated ground dove
- Plain pigeon
- White-crowned pigeon
- Maranon pigeon
- Grey-breasted brown dove
- Atoll fruit dove
- Lilac-crowned fruit dove
- Sula fruit dove
- Flame-breasted fruit dove
- Cream-breasted fruit dove
- Banggai fruit dove
- Pied cuckoo-dove
- Buru green pigeon
- Andaman green pigeon
- Whistling green pigeon
- Sumatran green pigeon
- Ashy-headed green pigeon
- Sumba green pigeon
- Black cuckoo-dove
- Galapagos dove
- Russet-crowned quail-dove

== Gruiformes ==
Cranes, rails, finfoots and trumpeters

=== Sarothruridae ===
Flufftails and forest rails

- Slender-billed flufftail

=== Rallidae ===
Rails, crakes, and coots

- Hawaiian coot
- Horned coot
- Pink-legged rail
- Dot-winged crake
- New Guinea flightless rail
- King rail
- Ridgway's rail
- Aztec rail
- Rouget's rail
- Band-bellied crake

=== Gruidae ===
Cranes

- Black-necked crane

== Podicipediformes ==
Grebes

- Northern silvery grebe

== Phoenicopteriformes ==
Flamingos

- Lesser flamingo
- James's flamingo
- Chilean flamingo

== Charadriiformes ==
Shorebirds and gulls

=== Burhinidae ===
Stone-curlews

- Beach stone-curlew
- Great stone-curlew

=== Haematopodidae ===
Oystercatchers

- Eurasian oystercatcher

=== Charadriidae ===
Plovers, dotterels, and lapwings

- Killdeer
- Double-banded plover
- Piping plover
- Mountain plover
- Snowy plover
- Malaysian plover
- Hooded dotterel
- Diademed plover
- River lapwing
- Northern lapwing

=== Rostratulidae ===
Painted-snipes

- South American painted-snipe

=== Scolopacidae ===
Sandpipers and allies

- Red knot
- Stilt sandpiper
- Semipalmated sandpiper
- Least sandpiper
- Red-necked stint
- Ruddy turnstone
- Subantarctic snipe
- Snares snipe
- Imperial snipe
- Great snipe
- Latham’s snipe
- Noble snipe
- Fuegian snipe
- Asian dowitcher
- Long-billed dowitcher
- Bar-tailed godwit
- Black-tailed godwit
- Eurasian curlew
- Bristle-thighed curlew
- Amami woodcock
- Javan woodcock

=== Glareolidae ===
Pratincoles and coursers

- Black-winged pratincole
- Madagascar pratincole

=== Laridae ===
Gulls, terns, and allies

- Inca tern
- Olrog's gull
- Black-billed gull
- Heermann's gull
- Ivory gull
- White-fronted tern
- Kerguelen tern
- Elegant tern

=== Alcidae ===
Auks and allies

- Kittlitz's murrelet
- Long-billed murrelet
- Cassin's auklet

== Gaviiformes ==
Loons (Divers)

- Yellow-billed loon

== Sphenisciformes ==
Penguins

- Fiordland penguin

== Procellariiformes ==
Petrels, albatrosses, and shearwaters

- Sooty shearwater
- Jouanin's petrel
- Cape Verde shearwater
- Streaked shearwater
- Hornby's storm-petrel
- Markham's storm-petrel
- Swinhoe's storm petrel
- Peruvian diving-petrel
- Laysan albatross
- Black-footed albatross
- Light-mantled albatross
- Grey petrel
- Tahiti petrel
- Fea's petrel
- Mottled petrel
- Murphy's petrel
- Black-vented shearwater
- Buller's albatross
- Shy albatross
- White-capped albatross

== Ciconiiformes ==
Storks

- Asian woolyneck
- Saddle-billed stork
- Greater adjutant
- Lesser adjutant

== Suliformes ==
Cormorants and allies

- Guanay cormorant
- Red-legged cormorant

== Pelecaniformes ==
Pelicans, ibises, and herons

- Agami heron
- Reddish egret
- Southern bald ibis
- White-eared night heron
- Schrenck's bittern
- Dalmatian pelican
- Spot-billed pelican
- Peruvian pelican
- Andean ibis
- Forest bittern

== Accipitriformes ==
Hawks, eagles, kites, and vultures

- White-bellied goshawk
- Moluccan goshawk
- Imitator goshawk
- Madagascar sparrowhawk
- Grey-bellied hawk
- Cinereous vulture
- Gurney's eagle
- Mountain buzzard
- Hawaiian hawk
- Forest buzzard
- Rufous crab hawk
- Cuban black hawk
- White-necked hawk
- Solitary eagle
- Southern banded snake eagle
- Pallid harrier
- Indian spotted eagle
- Plumbeous hawk
- Letter-winged kite
- Chestnut-shouldered goshawk
- Bearded vulture
- Himalayan vulture
- Harpy eagle
- Lesser fish eagle
- Grey-headed fish eagle
- Rufous-bellied eagle
- Crested eagle
- Mountain hawk-eagle
- Mantled hawk
- Mountain serpent eagle
- Ornate hawk-eagle
- Crowned eagle

== Strigiformes ==
Owls

=== Tytonidae ===
Barn owls

- Taliabu masked owl

=== Strigidae ===
Owls

- Fearful owl
- Guadalcanal owl
- Barred eagle-owl
- Albertine owlet
- Chestnut-backed owlet
- Tamaulipas pygmy owl
- Togian boobook
- Ochre-bellied boobook
- Chocolate boobook
- Rote boobook
- Sumba boobook
- Mindanao hawk owl
- Nicobar scops owl
- Javan scops owl
- Biak scops owl
- Ryūkyū scops owl
- Giant scops owl
- Rinjani scops owl
- Banggai scops-owl
- Mindoro scops owl
- Negros scops owl
- Reddish scops owl
- Sula scops owl
- Chaco owl
- Spotted owl

== Trogoniformes ==
Trogons

- Diard's trogon
- Scarlet-rumped trogon
- Red-naped trogon
- Resplendent quetzal
- Baird's trogon

== Bucerotiformes ==
Hornbills and hoopoes

- Austen's brown hornbill
- Bushy-crested hornbill
- Writhed hornbill
- Tickell's brown hornbill
- Malabar pied hornbill

== Coraciiformes ==
Kingfishers and allies

=== Coraciidae ===
Rollers

- Azure dollarbird

=== Brachypteraciidae ===
Ground rollers

- Rufous-headed ground roller

=== Alcedinidae ===
Kingfishers

- Black-headed kingfisher
- Rufous-collared kingfisher
- Green-backed kingfisher
- Scaly-breasted kingfisher
- Blyth's kingfisher
- Malay blue-banded kingfisher
- Southern silvery kingfisher
- Buru dwarf kingfisher
- Manus dwarf kingfisher
- Sulawesi dwarf kingfisher
- Northern silvery kingfisher
- Makira dwarf kingfisher
- Southern indigo-banded kingfisher
- Sula dwarf kingfisher
- Sangihe lilac kingfisher
- Brown-winged kingfisher
- Numfor paradise kingfisher
- Kofiau paradise kingfisher
- Biak paradise kingfisher
- White-mantled kingfisher
- Cinnamon-banded kingfisher
- Talaud kingfisher
- Vanuatu kingfisher
- Lazuli kingfisher
- Rusty-capped kingfisher
- Chattering kingfisher

=== Meropidae ===
Bee-eaters

- Blue-moustached bee-eater

== Piciformes ==
Woodpeckers, toucans, and barbets

=== Galbulidae ===
Jacamars

- Three-toed jacamar

=== Bucconidae ===
Puffbirds

- Sooty-capped puffbird

=== Capitonidae ===
New World barbets

- Black-girdled barbet
- Sira barbet
- Five-colored barbet
- Blue-chinned barbet (sometimes considered a subspecies of Versicolored barbet

=== Semnornithidae ===
Toucan barbets

- Toucan barbet

=== Ramphastidae ===
Toucans

- Plate-billed mountain toucan
- Yellow-browed toucanet
- Saffron toucanet
- Eastern red-necked araçari
- Ariel toucan
- Citron-throated toucan
- Keel-billed toucan

=== Megalaimidae ===
Asian barbets

- Sooty barbet
- Yellow-crowned barbet
- Red-throated barbet
- Red-crowned barbet

=== Lybiidae ===
African barbets

- Red-faced barbet

=== Indicatoridae ===
Honeyguides

- Malaysian honeyguide
- Yellow-footed honeyguide

=== Picidae ===
Woodpeckers

- Knysna woodpecker
- Red-headed flameback
- Javan flameback
- Chequer-throated yellownape
- Amami woodpecker
- Arabian woodpecker
- Spot-throated flameback
- Olive-backed woodpecker
- Ground woodpecker
- Black-bodied woodpecker
- Red-cockaded woodpecker
- Buff-necked woodpecker
- Northern sooty woodpecker
- Speckle-chested piculet
- Varzea piculet
- Sumatran woodpecker
- Red-collared woodpecker

== Falconiformes ==
Falcons and caracaras

- Red-necked falcon
- Orange-breasted falcon
- Laggar falcon
- White-fronted falconet
- Striated caracara
- White-rumped falcon

== Psittaciformes ==
Parrots

=== Cacatuidae ===
Cockatoos

- Tanimbar corella
- Palm cockatoo

=== Psittacidae ===
African & New World parrots

- Yellow-faced parrot
- Turquoise-fronted amazon
- Yellow-shouldered amazon
- Red-tailed amazon
- Northern festive amazon
- Blue-cheeked amazon
- Mealy amazon
- Festive amazon
- Northern mealy amazon
- Kawall's amazon
- Cuban amazon
- Golden-capped parakeet
- Olive-throated parakeet
- Mexican parrotlet
- Blue-winged macaw
- Red-masked parakeet
- Cordilleran parakeet
- Scarlet-fronted parakeet
- Iris lorikeet
- Bald parrot
- Saffron-headed parrot
- Blaze-winged parakeet
- Red-fronted parrotlet
- Spot-winged parrotlet
- Blue-bellied parrot

=== Psittaculidae ===
Old World parrots

- Fischer's lovebird
- Lilian's lovebird
- Jonquil parrot
- Comoro parrot
- Yellow-crowned parakeet
- Black-winged lory
- Blue-streaked lory
- Blue-eared lory
- Sangihe hanging parrot
- Yellow-throated hanging parrot
- White-naped lory
- Princess parrot
- Yellow-breasted racket-tail
- Montane racket-tail
- Mindanao racket-tail
- Masked shining parrot
- Crimson shining parrot
- Red-breasted parakeet
- Nicobar parakeet
- Lord Derby's parakeet
- Alexandrine parakeet
- Grey-headed parakeet
- Blossom-headed parakeet
- Simeulue parrot
- Blue-rumped parrot
- Blue-naped parrot
- Sula lorikeet
- Iris lorikeet
- Mindanao lorikeet
- Pohnpei lorikeet
- Leaf lorikeet

== Passeriformes ==
Passerines

=== Eurylaimidae ===
Broadbills

- Black-and-yellow broadbill

=== Calyptomenidae ===
African & green broadbills

- Green broadbill

=== Pittidae ===
Pittas

- Garnet pitta
- Giant pitta
- Malayan banded pitta
- Black-faced pitta
- Mangrove pitta
- Morotai pitta
- Biak hooded pitta

=== Furnariidae ===
Ovenbirds

- Pink-legged graveteiro
- White-browed foliage-gleaner
- Berlepsch's canastero
- Maquis canastero
- Hudson's canastero
- Cipo canastero
- Line-fronted canastero
- Santa Marta foliage-gleaner
- Long-tailed cinclodes
- Canebrake groundcreeper
- Henna-hooded foliage-gleaner
- Russet-mantled softtail
- Araucaria tit-spinetail
- White-browed tit-spinetail
- Tawny tit-spinetail
- Straight-billed reedhaunter
- Beautiful treerunner
- Star-chested treerunner
- Chestnut-backed thornbird
- Grey-throated leaftosser
- Peruvian recurvebill
- Bay-capped wren-spinetail
- Río Orinoco spinetail
- Cabanis's spinetail
- Chestnut-throated spinetail
- Bahia spinetail
- Apurímac spinetail
- Rusty-headed spinetail
- Great spinetail
- Dusky spinetail
- Striated softtail
- Equatorial greytail

=== Thamnophilidae ===
Antbirds

- Grey-headed antbird
- Rio de Janeiro antbird
- Bananal antbird
- Rondônia bushbird
- Ochre-rumped antbird
- Bicolored antvireo
- Spot-breasted antvireo
- Yellow-rumped antwren
- Parana antwren
- Sincorá antwren
- Narrow-billed antwren
- Creamy-bellied antwren
- Bahia antwren
- Magdalena antbird
- Salvadori's antwren
- Black-tailed antbird
- Wing-banded antbird
- Brown-bellied antwren
- Klages's antwren
- Unicolored antwren
- White-masked antbird
- Fringe-backed fire-eye
- White-breasted antbird
- Slender antbird
- Castelnau's antshrike
- Blackish-grey antshrike
- Cocha antshrike
- Spiny-faced antshrike

=== Grallariidae ===
Antpittas

- Chestnut antpitta
- Great antpitta
- Watkins's antpitta
- Ochre-breasted antpitta
- Scallop-breasted antpitta
- Peruvian antpitta
- White-browed antpitta

=== Conopophagidae ===
Gnateaters

- Rufous-crowned antpitta

=== Rhinocryptidae ===
Tapaculos

- Paramillo tapaculo
- Tacarcuna tapaculo

=== Tyrannidae ===
Tyrant flycatchers

- Black-billed flycatcher
- Ochraceous attila
- Chapada flycatcher
- Acre tody-tyrant
- Tumbes tyrant
- Yungas tyrannulet
- Bahia tyrannulet
- Rufous-lored tyrannulet
- São Paulo tyrannulet
- Minas Gerais tyrannulet
- Black-capped piprites
- Venezuelan bristle tyrant
- Bearded tachuri
- Dinelli's doradito
- Brujo flycatcher
- Chico's tyrannulet

=== Cotingidae ===
Cotingas

- Yellow-billed cotinga
- Black-headed berryeater
- Chestnut-bellied cotinga
- Bay-vented cotinga
- Bearded bellbird
- Bare-throated bellbird
- White-tailed cotinga
- White-cheeked cotinga

=== Pipridae ===
Manakins

- Wied's tyrant-manakin

=== Onychorhynchidae ===
Royal flycatchers and allies

- Western royal-flycatcher (subspecies of tropical royal flycatcher in IOC taxonomy, as Onychorhynchus coronatus ssp. occidentalis)

=== Ptilonorhynchidae ===
Bowerbirds

- Fire-maned bowerbird

=== Maluridae ===
Australasian wrens

- Short-tailed grasswren

=== Meliphagidae ===
Honeyeaters

- Eungella honeyeater
- Red-vested myzomela
- Dusky friarbird
- Gilliard's honeyeater

=== Acanthizidae ===
Australasian warblers

- Chestnut-breasted whiteface

=== Callaeidae ===
New Zealand wattlebirds

- North Island saddleback

=== Platysteiridae ===
Wattle-eyes and batises

- White-fronted wattle-eye

=== Malaconotidae ===
Bushshrikes

- Papyrus gonolek
- Lagden's bushshrike
- Monteiro's bushshrike

=== Vangidae ===
Vangas and allies

- Red-billed helmetshrike

=== Artamidae ===
Woodswallows, butcherbirds, and allies

- Tagula butcherbird

=== Aegithinidae ===
Ioras

- Green iora

=== Campephagidae ===
Cuckooshrikes

- New Caledonian cuckooshrike
- Pied cuckooshrike
- Buru cuckooshrike
- Grauer's cuckooshrike
- Solomons cuckooshrike
- McGregor's cuckooshrike
- Rossel cicadabird
- Samoan triller
- Fiery minivet

=== Pachycephalidae ===
Whistlers and allies

- Tongan whistler

=== Mohouidae ===
Whitehead, yellowhead, pipipi

- Yellowhead

=== Vireonidae ===
Vireos

- Black-capped vireo
- Bell's vireo
- Noronha vireo
- Choco vireo
- Blue Mountain vireo

=== Dicruridae ===
Drongos

- Aldabra drongo
- Paradise drongo
- Sumatran drongo

=== Rhipiduridae ===
Fantails

- Taveuni silktail
- Cockerell's fantail
- Cinnamon-tailed fantail
- Mussau fantail
- Long-tailed fantail
- Kadavu fantail
- Makira fantail

=== Monarchidae ===
Monarchs

- Hawaiʻi ʻelepaio
- Kauaʻi ʻelepaio
- Rennell shrikebill
- Black-throated shrikebill
- Short-crested monarch
- Versicolored monarch
- Solomons monarch
- Kolombangara monarch
- Yap monarch
- Manus monarch
- White-tailed monarch
- Mussau monarch
- Tinian monarch
- Samoan flycatcher
- Biak black flycatcher
- Makira flycatcher
- Biak monarch
- Kofiau monarch
- Japanese paradise flycatcher
- Bedford's paradise flycatcher

=== Platylophidae ===
Jayshrike (monotypic)

- Crested jayshrike

=== Laniidae ===
Shrikes

- Loggerhead shrike
- Woodchat shrike

=== Corvidae ===
Crows, jays, and allies

- Brown-headed crow
- Jamaican crow
- Collared crow
- Long-billed crow
- Hooded treepie
- Azure jay
- Tufted jay
- Dwarf jay
- Beautiful jay
- White-collared jay
- Black magpie
- Biddulph's ground jay

=== Paradisaeidae ===
Birds-of-paradise

- Wilson's bird-of-paradise
- Long-tailed paradigalla
- Emperor bird-of-paradise
- Red bird-of-paradise
- Wahnes's parotia

=== Petroicidae ===
Australasian robins

- Golden-bellied flyrobin
- Snow Mountains robin

=== Eupetidae ===
Rail-babbler (monotypic)

- Rail-babbler

=== Bombycillidae ===
Waxwings

- Japanese waxwing

=== Paridae ===
Tits and chickadees

- White-naped tit
- Palawan tit
- White-fronted tit

=== Alaudidae ===
Larks

- Sclater's lark

=== Pycnonotidae ===
Bulbuls

- Brown-cheeked bulbul
- Finsch's bulbul
- Cameroon greenbul
- Green-tailed bristlebill
- Nicobar bulbul
- Buff-vented bulbul
- Streaked bulbul
- Zamboanga bulbul
- Grey-headed greenbul
- Grey-bellied bulbul
- Puff-backed bulbul
- Black-and-white bulbul
- Yellow-eared bulbul
- Grey-headed bulbul
- Scaly-breasted bulbul
- Spot-necked bulbul

=== Hirundinidae ===
Swallows and martins

- Peruvian martin

=== Cettiidae ===
Cettia bush warblers and allies

- Tanimbar bush warbler
- Bougainville bush warbler

=== Phylloscopidae ===
Leaf warblers

- Tytler's leaf warbler

=== Acrocephalidae ===
Reed warblers and allies

- Cook reed warbler
- Rodrigues warbler
- Seychelles warbler

=== Locustellidae ===
Grassbirds and allies

- Bangwa forest warbler
- Ja River scrub warbler
- Long-billed bush warbler
- Sri Lanka bush warbler
- Timor bush warbler
- Bougainville thicketbird
- Santo thicketbird
- Grey-banded babbler

=== Bernieridae ===
Tetrakas and allies

- Madagascar yellowbrow
- Wedge-tailed jery
- Grey-crowned tetraka
- Spectacled tetraka

=== Cisticolidae ===
Cisticolas and allies

- Yellow-throated apalis
- Turner's eremomela
- Visayan miniature babbler
- Yellow-breasted tailorbird
- White-tailed warbler

=== Sylviidae ===
Sylviid babblers

- Dartford warbler

=== Paradoxornithidae ===
Parrotbills and allies

- Reed parrotbill
- Black-headed parrotbill

=== Zosteropidae ===
White-eyes

- Bonin white-eye
- Flame-templed babbler
- Spot-breasted heleia
- Giant white-eye
- Long-billed white-eye
- Sanford's white-eye
- Javan white-eye
- Pearl-bellied white-eye
- Plain white-eye
- Ambon white-eye
- Tagula white-eye
- Biak white-eye
- Christmas white-eye
- Olive-colored white-eye
- Saipan white-eye
- Togian white-eye
- Slender-billed white-eye
- Golden-bellied white-eye
- Vella Lavella white-eye

=== Timaliidae ===
Old World babblers

- Fluffy-backed tit-babbler
- Rufous-throated wren-babbler
- Golden-crowned babbler
- White-breasted babbler
- Sikkim wedge-billed babbler
- Palawan striped babbler
- Panay striped babbler
- White-necked babbler
- Chestnut-rumped babbler
- Black-throated babbler
- Mindanao pygmy babbler
- Visayan pygmy babbler
- Cachar wedge-billed babbler
- Luzon striped babbler

=== Pellorneidae ===
Ground babblers

- Indian grassbird
- Rufous-winged illadopsis
- Striped wren-babbler
- Rufous-vented grass-babbler
- Black-browed babbler
- Sooty-capped babbler
- Grey-breasted babbler
- Rufous-crowned babbler
- Melodious babbler
- Short-tailed scimitar babbler
- Sumatran babbler
- Short-tailed babbler
- White-chested babbler
- Black-throated wren-babbler
- Large wren-babbler

=== Leiothrichidae ===
Laughingthrushes and allies

- Black-crowned barwing
- Orange-billed babbler
- Brown fulvetta
- Vietnamese cutia
- Cambodian laughingthrush
- Chestnut-backed laughingthrush
- Taiwan hwamei
- Chapin's babbler
- Red-collared babbler
- Spotted crocias
- Pelani laughingthrush

=== Irenidae ===
Fairy-bluebirds

- Philippine fairy-bluebird
- Palawan fairy-bluebird

=== Troglodytidae ===
Wrens

- Yucatan wren
- Bar-winged wood wren
- Sumichrast's wren
- Tooth-billed wren
- Socorro wren

=== Polioptilidae ===
Gnatcatchers

- Creamy-bellied gnatcatcher

=== Sittidae ===
Nuthatches

- Yellow-billed nuthatch
- Yunnan nuthatch

=== Mimidae ===
Mockingbirds and thrashers

- San cristobal mockingbird

=== Sturnidae ===
Starlings

- Tanimbar starling
- Atoll starling
- Yellow-eyed starling
- Rusty-winged starling
- Helmeted myna
- Apo myna
- Sri Lanka hill myna
- Copper-tailed starling
- Bare-eyed myna

=== Turdidae ===
Thrushes

- Rusty-bellied shortwing
- Sulawesi mountain-thrush
- Cuban solitaire
- Brown-winged whistling thrush
- Malayan whistling thrush
- Tristan thrush
- Unicoloured thrush
- Redwing
- Forest thrush
- Crossley's ground thrush
- Chestnut-backed thrush
- Buru thrush
- Red-backed thrush
- Everett's thrush
- Sri Lanka thrush
- Seram thrush
- Enggano thrush
- Fawn-breasted thrush
- White-bellied thrush
- Red-and-black thrush
- Oberländer's ground thrush
- Orange-sided thrush
- Slaty-backed thrush
- Spot-winged thrush
- Black-backed thrush

=== Muscicapidae ===
Old World flycatchers

- Palawan blue flycatcher
- Malaysian blue flycatcher
- Chestnut-naped forktail
- Ryukyu robin
- Dull-blue flycatcher
- Furtive flycatcher
- Rufous-chested flycatcher
- Damar flycatcher
- Rufous-throated flycatcher
- Black-banded flycatcher
- Firethroat
- Amber Mountain rock thrush
- Sumba brown flycatcher
- Maroon-breasted philentoma
- Przevalski's redstart
- Luzon water-tyrant
- Streak-breasted jungle flycatcher
- Henna-tailed jungle flycatcher
- Slaty-backed jungle flycatcher
- Grey-chested jungle flycatcher
- Canary Islands stonechat
- White-bellied bush chat
- East coast akalat
- Rufous-tailed shama

=== Chloropseidae ===
Leafbirds

- Lesser green leafbird
- Blue-masked leafbird

=== Dicaeidae ===
Flowerpeckers

- Flame-crowned flowerpecker
- Brown-backed flowerpecker
- Legge's flowerpecker
- Scarlet-breasted flowerpecker

=== Nectariniidae ===
Sunbirds

- Lina's sunbird
- Plain-backed sunbird
- Red-throated sunbird
- Moreau's sunbird
- Neergaard's sunbird
- Ursula's sunbird

=== Ploceidae ===
Weavers

- Jackson's widowbird
- Rodrigues fody
- Seychelles fody
- Asian golden weaver
- Olive-headed weaver
- Fox's weaver

=== Estrildidae ===
Waxbills, munias, and allies

- Anambra waxbill
- Timor sparrow
- Red-fronted antpecker

=== Motacillidae ===
Wagtails and pipits

- Yellow-tufted pipit
- Mountain pipit
- Abyssinian longclaw
- Madanga
- Mekong wagtail

=== Fringillidae ===
Finches and euphonias

- Oʻahu ʻamakihi
- Protea canary
- Salvadori's seedeater
- Tenerife blue chaffinch
- Warsangli linnet
- Somali golden-winged grosbeak
- Arabian golden-winged grosbeak

=== Emberizidae ===
Buntings

- Cinereous bunting
- Ochre-rumped bunting

=== Passerellidae ===
New World sparrows

- Olive finch
- São Francisco sparrow
- Yellow-headed brush finch
- Dusky-headed brush finch
- Vilcabamba brush finch
- Cabani's ground sparrow
- Bachman's sparrow
- Cinnamon-tailed sparrow

=== Phaenicophilidae ===
Hispaniolan palm-tanagers

- Grey-crowned palm-tanager

=== Icteridae ===
Oropendolas, New World orioles, and blackbirds

- Selva cacique
- Eastern meadowlark

=== Parulidae ===
New World warblers

- Altamira yellowthroat
- Santa Marta warbler
- White-lored warbler
- Grey-headed warbler
- White-fronted whitestart
- Cerulean warbler
- Kirtland's warbler
- Vitelline warbler
- Golden-winged warbler

=== Cardinalidae ===
Cardinals and allies

- Black-cheeked ant tanager
- Rose-bellied bunting

=== Thraupidae ===
Tanagers and allies

- Blue-and-gold tanager
- Woodpecker finch
- Coal-crested finch
- Multicolored tanager
- Golden-backed mountain tanager
- Bicolored conebill
- Turquoise dacnis
- Black-legged dacnis
- Chestnut-bellied flowerpiercer
- Carriker's mountain-tanager
- Purplish-mantled tanager
- Parodi's hemispingus
- Grey-capped hemispingus
- Cuban bullfinch
- Grand Cayman bullfinch
- Plain-tailed warbling finch
- Shrike-like tanager
- Brown tanager
- Giant conebill
- Slaty-backed hemispingus
- Rufous-breasted warbling finch
- Blue finch
- Rufous-rumped seedeater
- Ibera seedeater
- Black-bellied seedeater
- Dark-throated seedeater
- Green-capped tanager
- Slender-billed finch

== See also ==
- Lists of IUCN Red List near threatened species
- List of least concern birds
- List of vulnerable birds
- List of endangered birds
- List of critically endangered birds
- List of recently extinct birds
- List of data deficient birds
