= List of endangered birds =

- Extinct in the wild (EW): 5 species
- Critically endangered (CR): 216 species
- Endangered (EN): 372 species
- Vulnerable (VU): 670 species
- Near threatened (NT): 967 species
- Least concern (LC): 8,767 species
- Data deficient (DD): 37 species
Avian species (IUCN, 2025-2)
- 11,198 extant species have been evaluated
- 11,161 of those are fully assessed (Note: excludes data deficient evaluations.)
- 9,734 are not threatened at present (Note: NT and LC.)
- 1,427 to 1,464 are threatened (Note: Threatened comprises CR, EN and VU. Upper estimate additionally includes DD.)
- 169 to 187 are extinct or extinct in the wild:
  - 164 extinct (EX) species (Note: Chart omits extinct (EX) species)
  - 5 extinct in the wild (EW)
  - 18 possibly extinct [CR(PE)]

Endangered (EN) species are considered to be facing a very high risk of extinction in the wild.

In December 2019, the International Union for Conservation of Nature (IUCN) listed 460 endangered avian species. Of all evaluated avian species, 4% are listed as endangered. No subpopulations of birds have been evaluated by the IUCN.

For a species to be considered endangered by the IUCN it must meet certain quantitative criteria which are designed to classify taxa facing "a very high risk of extinction". An even higher risk is faced by critically endangered species, which meet the quantitative criteria for endangered species. Critically endangered birds are listed separately. There are 683 avian species which are endangered or critically endangered.

Additionally 53 avian species (0.48% of those evaluated) are listed as data deficient, meaning there is insufficient information for a full assessment of conservation status. As these species typically have small distributions and/or populations, they are intrinsically likely to be threatened, according to the IUCN. While the category of data deficient indicates that no assessment of extinction risk has been made for the taxa, the IUCN notes that it may be appropriate to give them "the same degree of attention as threatened taxa, at least until their status can be assessed".

This is a complete list of endangered avian species evaluated by the IUCN. Where possible, common names for taxa are given while links point to the scientific name used by the IUCN.

== Tinamiformes ==
Tinamous

- Dwarf tinamou

== Anseriformes ==
Ducks, geese, swans, and screamers

- Bernier's teal
- Meller's duck
- Swan goose
- Blue duck
- Scaly-sided merganser
- White-headed duck
- Maccoa duck

== Galliformes ==
Landfowl

- Waigeo brushturkey
- Gunnison grouse
- Red-billed curassow
- Wattled curassow
- Bornean crestless fireback
- Horned guan
- Horned curassow
- Green peafowl
- White-winged guan
- Baudo guan
- Black-fronted piping guan
- Hainan peacock-pheasant
- Malayan peacock-pheasant
- Bornean peacock-pheasant
- Black-fronted spurfowl (sometimes considered a subspecies of Chestnut-naped spurfowl)
- Mount Cameroon spurfowl
- Udzungwa forest partridge

== Apodiformes ==
Hummingbirds and swifts

- Mangrove hummingbird
- Perija starfrontlet
- Glittering starfrontlet
- Colorful puffleg
- Black-breasted puffleg
- Blue-capped hummingbird
- Scissor-tailed hummingbird
- Blue-bearded helmetcrest
- Glow-throated hummingbird
- Grey-bellied comet
- Long-tailed woodnymph

== Otidiformes ==
Bustards

- Ludwig's bustard
- Great bustard

== Cuculiformes ==
Cuckoos

- Coral-billed ground cuckoo
- Sumatran ground cuckoo
- Bay-breasted cuckoo

== Columbiformes ==
Pigeons and doves

- Palau ground dove
- Wetar ground dove
- Caroline ground dove
- Marquesas ground dove
- Santa Cruz ground dove
- São Tomé olive pigeon
- Polynesian imperial pigeon
- Marquesan imperial pigeon
- White-fronted quail-dove
- Indigo-crowned quail-dove
- Tawitawi brown dove
- Raiatea fruit dove
- Blue-headed quail dove
- Comoro green pigeon
- Timor green pigeon
- São Tomé green pigeon
- Tuxtla quail dove

== Gruiformes ==
Cranes, rails, finfoots, and trumpeters

- Grey crowned crane
- Whooping crane
- Talaud rail
- Okinawa rail
- Lord Howe woodhen
- Black rail
- Junin crake
- Takahē
- Olive-winged trumpeter
- Plain-flanked rail
- Sakalava rail

== Podicipediformes ==
Grebes

- Junin grebe
- Titicaca grebe
- Madagascar grebe

== Charadriiformes ==
Shorebirds and gulls

- Madagascar jacana
- Marbled murrelet
- Great knot
- Black-fronted tern
- Chatham oystercatcher
- Far Eastern curlew
- Tuamotu sandpiper
- Indian skimmer
- Australian painted-snipe
- Black-bellied tern
- Peruvian tern
- Guadalupe murrelet
- Shore dotterel
- Nordmann's greenshank

== Eurypygiformes ==
Sunbittern, Kagu

- Kagu

== Sphenisciformes ==
Penguins

- Emperor penguin
- Northern rockhopper penguin
- Erect-crested penguin
- Yellow-eyed penguin
- Galapagos penguin

== Procellariiformes ==
Petrels, albatrosses, and shearwaters

- Amsterdam albatross
- Antipodean albatross
- Northern royal albatross
- Polynesian storm petrel
- Ashy storm petrel
- Townsend's storm petrel
- Sooty albatross
- Westland petrel
- Henderson petrel
- Barau's petrel
- Bermuda petrel
- Black-capped petrel
- Atlantic petrel
- Zino's petrel
- Hawaiian petrel
- Bannerman's shearwater
- Hutton's shearwater
- Indian yellow-nosed albatross
- Atlantic yellow-nosed albatross
- Grey-headed albatross

== Ciconiiformes ==
Storks

- Oriental stork
- Storm's stork
- Milky stork

== Suliformes ==
Cormorants and allies

- Cape gannet
- Abbott's booby
- Cape cormorant
- Pitt shag
- Bank cormorant

== Pelecaniformes ==
Pelicans, ibises, and herons

- Humblot's heron
- Malagasy pond heron
- Northern bald ibis
- Crested ibis
- Malagasy sacred ibis

== Accipitriformes ==
Hawks, eagles, kites, and vultures

=== Sagittariidae ===
Secretarybird (monotypic)

- Secretarybird

=== Accipitridae ===
Kites, hawks, eagles, and Old World vultures

- Gundlach's hawk
- Steppe eagle
- Rufous-tailed hawk
- Chaco eagle
- Malagasy harrier
- Réunion harrier
- Black harrier
- Red goshawk
- Madagascar serpent eagle
- Pallas's fish eagle
- White-collared kite
- Egyptian vulture
- Javan hawk-eagle
- Flores hawk-eagle
- Philippine hawk-eagle
- Pinsker's hawk-eagle
- Martial eagle
- Great Nicobar serpent eagle
- Black-and-chestnut eagle
- Bateleur
- Lappet-faced vulture

== Strigiformes ==
Owls

- Forest owlet
- Romblon boobook
- Little Sumba boobook
- Anjouan scops owl
- Sokoke scops owl
- Moheli scops owl
- Karthala scops owl
- Serendib scops owl

== Bucerotiformes ==
Hornbills and hoopoes

- White-crowned hornbill
- Mindoro hornbill
- Visayan hornbill
- Wrinkled hornbill
- Walden's hornbill
- Sumba hornbill

== Piciformes ==
Woodpeckers, toucans, and barbets

- Yellow-faced flameback
- Fernandina's flicker
- Okinawa woodpecker
- White-bellied barbet (treated as a subspecies of Lybius leucocephalus (LC) by IOC taxonomy)
- Lesser crescent-chested puffbird (treated as a subspecies of Malacoptila striata (LC) by IOC taxonomy)
- White-rumped woodpecker

== Falconiformes ==
Falcons and caracaras

- Saker falcon
- Mauritius kestrel

== Psittaciformes ==
Parrots

=== Strigopidae ===
New Zealand parrots

- Kea

=== Cacatuidae ===
Cockatoos

- White cockatoo
- Salmon-crested cockatoo
- Carnaby's black cockatoo

=== Psittacidae ===
African & New World parrots

- Black-billed amazon
- Lilac-crowned amazon
- Yellow-headed amazon
- Vinaceous-breasted amazon
- Red-crowned amazon
- Lear's macaw
- Sun parakeet
- Grey parrot
- Timneh parrot
- Perija parakeet
- El Oro parakeet
- Pfrimer's parakeet
- Santa Marta parakeet
- Thick-billed parrot
- Maroon-fronted parrot

=== Psittaculidae ===
Old World parrots

- Sumba eclectus
- Red-and-blue lory
- Purple-naped lory
- Green racket-tail
- Golden-shouldered parrot
- Blue-backed parrot
- Sunset lorikeet
- Kuhl's lorikeet

== Passeriformes ==
Passerines

=== Acanthisittidae ===
New Zealand wrens

- New Zealand rock wren

=== Pittidae ===
Pittas

- Superb pitta

=== Furnariidae ===
Ovenbirds

- Perijá thistletail
- Pernambuco foliage-gleaner
- Royal cinclodes
- Paria barbtail
- White-throated barbtail
- Pinto's spinetail
- Hoary-throated spinetail

=== Thamnophilidae ===
Antbirds

- Recurve-billed bushbird
- Black-hooded antwren
- Scalloped antbird

=== Grallariidae ===
Antpittas

- Cundinamarca antpitta
- Jocotoco antpitta

=== Rhinocryptidae ===
Tapaculos

- Bahia tapaculo
- Diamantina tapaculo
- Boa Nova tapaculo
- Brasilia tapaculo
- El Oro tapaculo
- Magdalena tapaculo

=== Tyrannidae ===
Tyrant flycatchers

- Juan Fernandez tit-tyrant
- Santa Marta bush tyrant
- Urich's tyrannulet
- Giant kingbird

=== Cotingidae ===
Cotingas

- Bare-necked umbrellabird
- Apolo cotinga

=== Tityridae ===
Tityras, becards, and allies

- Buff-throated purpletuft

=== Atrichornithidae ===
Scrubbirds

- Noisy scrubbird
- Rufous scrubbird

=== Maluridae ===
Australasian wrens

- White-throated grasswren
- Mallee emu-wren

=== Meliphagidae ===
Honeyeaters

- Mao
- Black-eared miner

=== Dasyornithidae ===
Bristlebirds

- Western bristlebird

=== Pardalotidae ===
Pardalotes

- Forty-spotted pardalote

=== Malaconotidae ===
Bushshrikes and allies

- Mount Kupe bushshrike
- Gabela bushshrike
- Braun's bushshrike
- Uluguru bushshrike

=== Vangidae ===
Vangas and allies

- Helmet vanga
- Bernier's vanga
- Gabela helmetshrike
- Van Dam's vanga

=== Oriolidae ===
Figbirds, Old World orioles, piopios

- Silver oriole

=== Dicruridae ===
Drongos

- Grand Comoro drongo
- Tablas drongo

=== Monarchidae ===
Monarchs

- Santa Cruz shrikebill
- Chuuk monarch
- Marquesan monarch
- White-tipped monarch
- Flores monarch

=== Corvidae ===
Crows, jays, and allies

- Flores crow
- Asir magpie
- White-winged magpie
- Stresemann's bushcrow

=== Petroicidae ===
Australasian robins

- Norfolk Island robin

=== Paridae ===
Tits and chickadees

- Owston's tit

=== Alaudidae ===
Larks

- Rudd's lark
- Sharpe's lark (subspecies M. a. sharpii)
- Botha's lark

=== Pycnonotidae ===
Bulbuls

- Brown-cheeked bulbul
- Streak-breasted bulbul
- Aceh bulbul

=== Hirundinidae ===
Swallows and martins

- Galápagos martin
- Bahama swallow

=== Macrosphenidae ===
Crombecs, African warblers, longbills

- Pulitzer's longbill

=== Acrocephalidae ===
Reed warblers and allies

- Bokikokiko
- Millerbird
- Basra reed warbler
- Pitcairn reed warbler

=== Locustellidae ===
Grassbirds and allies

- Long-legged thicketbird

=== Cisticolidae ===
Cisticolas and allies

- Namuli apalis
- Mozambique forest warbler (subspecies A. m. sousae)
- Sierra Leone prinia

=== Zosteropidae ===
White-eyes

- Golden white-eye
- Teardrop white-eye
- Príncipe white-eye
- Javan white-eye
- Wangi-wangi white-eye
- Negros striped babbler

=== Pellorneidae ===
Ground babblers

- White-throated wren-babbler

=== Leiothrichidae ===
Laughingthrushes and allies

- Sumatran laughingthrush
- Grey-crowned crocias
- Nilgiri laughingthrush
- Banasura laughingthrush
- Golden-winged laughingthrush
- Collared laughingthrush

=== Hyliotidae ===
Hyliotas

- Usambara hyliota

=== Troglodytidae ===
Wrens

- Apolinar's wren
- Zapata wren

=== Sittidae ===
Nuthatches

- Algerian nuthatch
- Giant nuthatch
- White-browed nuthatch

=== Mimidae ===
Mockingbirds and thrashers

- Floreana mockingbird
- White-breasted thrasher

=== Sturnidae ===
Starlings

- Black-winged myna
- Mountain starling

=== Turdidae ===
Thrushes

- Chestnut-capped thrush
- Taita thrush

=== Muscicapidae ===
Old World flycatchers

- Black shama
- Seychelles magpie-robin
- Matinan blue flycatcher
- Lompobattang flycatcher
- Humblot's flycatcher
- Rufous-headed robin
- Amber Mountain rock thrush
- Nilgiri blue robin
- Sri Lanka whistling thrush
- Rubeho akalat
- Gabela akalat
- Usambara akalat
- White-throated jungle flycatcher

=== Chloropseidae ===
Leafbirds

- Javan leafbird
- Sumatran leafbird
- Greater green leafbird

=== Nectariniidae ===
Sunbirds

- Amani sunbird
- Loveridge's sunbird

=== Ploceidae ===
Weavers

- Aldabra fody
- Mauritius fody
- Gola malimbe
- Ibadan malimbe
- Golden-naped weaver
- Bates's weaver
- Clarke's weaver
- Usambara weaver

=== Estrildidae ===
Estrildid finches

- Shelley's crimsonwing
- Java sparrow

=== Motacillidae ===
Wagtails and pipits

- Sokoke pipit
- Sharpe's longclaw

=== Fringillidae ===
Finches and euphonias

- Kauaʻi ʻamakihi
- Yellow-throated seedeater
- ʻAkiapolaʻau
- Black rosy finch
- Brown-capped rosy finch
- ʻAnianiau
- Hispaniolan crossbill
- Hawaiʻi ʻakepa
- Hawaiʻi creeper
- Maui ʻalauahio
- Red siskin

=== Emberizidae ===
Buntings

- Jankowski's bunting

=== Passerellidae ===
New World sparrows

- Saltmarsh sparrow
- Black-spectacled brush finch
- Pale-headed brush finch
- Worthen's sparrow
- Sierra Madre sparrow

=== Icteridae ===
Oropendolas, blackbirds, and New World orioles

- Tricolored blackbird
- Yellow-shouldered blackbird
- Saint Lucia oriole
- Colombian mountain grackle
- Jamaican blackbird
- Baudó oropendola
- Saffron-cowled blackbird

=== Parulidae ===
New World warblers

- Whistling warbler
- Paria whitestart
- Elfin woods warbler
- Bahama warbler
- Golden-cheeked warbler

=== Thraupidae ===
Tanagers and allies

- Cone-billed tanager
- Venezuelan flowerpiercer
- Yellow cardinal
- Saint Lucia black finch
- Great-billed seed finch
- Marsh seedeater

== See also ==
- Lists of IUCN Red List endangered species
- List of least concern birds
- List of near threatened birds
- List of vulnerable birds
- List of critically endangered birds
- List of extinct bird species since 1500
- List of data deficient birds
