= List of vulnerable birds =

- Extinct in the wild (EW): 5 species
- Critically endangered (CR): 216 species
- Endangered (EN): 372 species
- Vulnerable (VU): 670 species
- Near threatened (NT): 967 species
- Least concern (LC): 8,767 species
- Data deficient (DD): 37 species
Avian species (IUCN, 2025-2)
- 11,198 extant species have been evaluated
- 11,161 of those are fully assessed (Note: excludes data deficient evaluations.)
- 9,734 are not threatened at present (Note: NT and LC.)
- 1,427 to 1,464 are threatened (Note: Threatened comprises CR, EN and VU. Upper estimate additionally includes DD.)
- 169 to 187 are extinct or extinct in the wild:
  - 164 extinct (EX) species (Note: Chart omits extinct (EX) species)
  - 5 extinct in the wild (EW)
  - 18 possibly extinct [CR(PE)]

Vulnerable (VU) species are considered to be facing a high risk of extinction in the wild.

As of June 2026, the International Union for Conservation of Nature (IUCN) listed 668 vulnerable avian species. Of all evaluated avian species, 6.0% are listed as vulnerable. No subpopulations of birds have been evaluated by the IUCN.

For a species to be assessed as vulnerable to extinction the best available evidence must meet quantitative criteria set by the IUCN designed to reflect "a high risk of extinction in the wild". Endangered and critically endangered species also meet the quantitative criteria of vulnerable species, and are listed separately. See: List of endangered birds, List of critically endangered birds. Vulnerable, endangered and critically endangered species are collectively referred to as threatened species by the IUCN.

Additionally, 36 avian species (0.3% of those evaluated) are listed as data deficient, meaning there is insufficient information for a full assessment of conservation status. As these species typically have small distributions and/or populations, they are intrinsically likely to be threatened, according to the IUCN. While the category of data deficient indicates that no assessment of extinction risk has been made for the taxa, the IUCN notes that it may be appropriate to give them "the same degree of attention as threatened taxa, at least until their status can be assessed".

This is a complete list of vulnerable avian species evaluated by the IUCN. Where possible common names for taxa are given while links point to the scientific name used by the IUCN.

== Struthioniformes ==
Ostriches

- Somali ostrich

== Apterygiformes ==
Kiwis

- Southern brown kiwi
- Great spotted kiwi
- North Island brown kiwi
- Okarito kiwi

== Tinamiformes ==
Tinamous

- Slaty-breasted tinamou
- Taczanowski's tinamou
- Lesser nothura
- Black tinamou
- Grey tinamou

== Anseriformes ==
Ducks, geese, swans, and screamers

- Campbell teal
- Lesser white-fronted goose
- Hawaiian duck
- Common pochard
- Red-breasted goose
- Long-tailed duck
- Velvet scoter
- Steller's eider
- Chubut steamer duck

== Galliformes ==
Landfowl

=== Megapodiidae ===
Megapodes

- Moluccan megapode
- Malleefowl
- Sula megapode
- Nicobar megapode
- Tongan scrubfowl
- Tanimbar scrubfowl

=== Cracidae ===
Chachalacas, curassows, and guans

- Bare-faced curassow
- Great curassow
- Rufous-headed chachalaca
- Helmeted curassow
- White-browed guan
- Chestnut-bellied guan
- Cauca guan
- White-crested guan
- Highland guan

=== Numididae ===
Guineafowl

- White-breasted guineafowl

=== Odontophoridae ===
New World quail

- Ocellated quail
- Bearded wood partridge

=== Phasianidae ===
Pheasants and allies

- Hainan partridge
- Chestnut-necklaced partridge
- Grey-breasted partridge
- Sichuan partridge
- Great argus
- Cheer pheasant
- Greater sage-grouse
- Chinese monal
- Bulwer's pheasant
- Bornean crested fireback
- Malaysian crested fireback
- Black partridge
- Germain's peacock-pheasant
- Palawan peacock-pheasant
- Swierstra's spurfowl
- Crested partridge
- Mrs. Hume's pheasant
- Reeves's pheasant
- Blyth's tragopan
- Cabot's tragopan
- Western tragopan
- Lesser prairie chicken

== Caprimulgiformes ==
Nightjars

- Puerto Rican nightjar
- Bonaparte's nightjar
- Nechisar nightjar
- Sickle-winged nightjar
- White-winged nightjar
- Solomons nightjar

== Podargiformes ==
Frogmouths

- Large frogmouth

== Apodiformes ==
Hummingbirds and swifts

- Mariana swiftlet
- Seychelles swiftlet
- Atiu swiftlet
- Purple-backed sunbeam
- Venezuelan sylph
- Honduran emerald
- Santa Marta blossomcrown
- Chimney swift
- Esmeraldas woodstar
- Black inca
- Hook-billed hermit
- Violet-throated metaltail
- Buffy helmetcrest
- Mexican woodnymph

== Otidiformes ==
Bustards

- Southern black korhaan
- Asian houbara
- African houbara
- Nubian bustard

== Cuculiformes ==
Cuckoos

- Bornean ground cuckoo
- Green-billed coucal
- Sunda coucal
- Short-toed coucal
- Cocos cuckoo
- Giant coua
- Rufous-vented ground cuckoo
- Banded ground cuckoo
- Red-faced malkoha

== Mesitornithiformes ==
Mesites

- Brown mesite
- White-breasted mesite
- Subdesert mesite

== Columbiformes ==
Pigeons and doves

- Yellow-eyed pigeon
- Yellow-legged pigeon
- Pale-capped pigeon
- Sri Lanka wood pigeon
- Vanuatu imperial pigeon
- Spotted imperial pigeon
- Micronesian imperial pigeon
- Mindanao bleeding-heart
- Grey-fronted quail-dove
- Western crowned pigeon
- Scheepmaker's crowned pigeon
- Chatham Islands pigeon
- New Britain bronzewing
- Pink pigeon
- Azuero dove
- Ochre-bellied dove
- White-naped pheasant-pigeon
- Ring-tailed pigeon
- Mindanao brown dove
- Makatea fruit dove
- Red-naped fruit dove
- Carunculated fruit dove
- Henderson fruit dove
- Jambu fruit dove
- Philippine collared dove
- European turtle dove
- Large green pigeon
- Flores green pigeon
- Cinnamon-headed green pigeon
- Pemba green pigeon

== Gruiformes ==
Cranes, rails, finfoots, and trumpeters

=== Rallidae ===
Rails, crakes, and coots

- Talaud bush-hen
- Snoring rail
- Inaccessible Island rail
- Gough moorhen
- Weka
- Calayan rail
- Invisible rail
- Galapagos crake
- Rufous-faced crake
- Auckland rail
- Tsingy wood rail
- Austral rail
- Madagascar rail
- Bogotá rail
- Henderson crake

=== Psophiidae ===
Trumpeters

- Dark-winged trumpeter

=== Gruidae ===
Cranes

- Blue crane
- Sarus crane
- White-naped crane
- Black crowned crane
- Wattled crane
- Red-crowned crane
- Hooded crane

== Podicipediformes ==
Grebes

- Horned grebe

== Phoenicopteriformes ==
Flamingos

- Andean flamingo

== Charadriiformes ==
Shorebirds and gulls

- Wrybill
- Peruvian thick-knee
- Saint Helena plover
- Madagascar plover
- Sharp-tailed sandpiper
- Buff-breasted sandpiper
- Chatham Islands snipe
- Atlantic puffin
- Madagascar snipe
- Wood snipe
- Audouin's gull
- Lava gull
- Relict gull
- Aleutian tern
- Magellanic plover
- Red-legged kittiwake
- Black-legged kittiwake
- Saunders's gull
- Moluccan woodcock
- River tern
- Fairy tern
- Craveri's murrelet
- Scripps's murrelet
- Japanese murrelet
- Black-breasted buttonquail

== Sphenisciformes ==
Penguins

- Southern rockhopper penguin
- Macaroni penguin
- Snares penguin
- Humboldt penguin

== Procellariiformes ==
Petrels, albatrosses, and shearwaters

=== Diomedeidae ===
Albatrosses

- Southern royal albatross
- Wandering albatross
- Short-tailed albatross
- Chatham albatross
- Campbell albatross
- Salvin's albatross

=== Hydrobatidae ===
Northern storm petrels

- Matsudaira's storm petrel
- Monteiro's storm petrel

=== Procellariidae ===
Petrels and shearwaters

- Buller's shearwater
- Pink-footed shearwater
- White-chinned petrel
- Spectacled petrel
- Black petrel
- Phoenix petrel
- Trindade petrel
- Chatham Islands petrel
- Collared petrel
- White-necked petrel
- Cook's petrel
- De Filippi's petrel
- Desertas petrel
- Juan Fernández petrel
- Gould's petrel
- Stejneger's petrel
- Pycroft's petrel
- Hawaiian petrel
- Heinroth's shearwater
- Yelkouan shearwater

== Suliformes ==
Cormorants and allies

- Ascension frigatebird
- Campbell shag
- New Zealand king shag
- Otago shag
- Auckland shag
- Flightless cormorant
- Socotra cormorant
- Bounty shag

== Pelecaniformes ==
Pelicans, ibises, and herons

- Shoebill
- Australasian bittern
- Chinese egret
- Slaty egret
- Japanese night heron
- Madagascar ibis
- Black-faced spoonbill

== Accipitriformes ==
Hawks, eagles, kites, and vultures

- New Britain sparrowhawk
- Nicobar sparrowhawk
- Henst's goshawk
- Slaty-mantled goshawk
- New Britain goshawk
- Spanish imperial eagle
- Eastern imperial eagle
- Tawny eagle
- Galapagos hawk
- Socotra buzzard
- Scissor-tailed kite
- Beaudouin's snake eagle
- Greater spotted eagle
- Cape vulture
- Steller's sea eagle
- Sanford's sea eagle
- Harpy eagle
- Papuan eagle
- Black honey buzzard
- Wallace's hawk-eagle
- Grey-backed hawk
- Andaman serpent eagle
- Andean condor

== Strigiformes ==
Owls

=== Tytonidae ===
Barn owls

- Golden masked owl
- Red owl

=== Strigidae ===
Owls

- Malaita owl
- Makira owl
- Blakiston's fish owl
- Philippine eagle-owl
- Snowy owl
- Shelley's eagle-owl
- Cloud-forest pygmy owl
- Santa Marta screech owl
- Camiguin boobook
- Mindoro hawk-owl
- Christmas boobook
- New Britain boobook
- Sulu boobook
- Cebu boobook
- Flores scops owl
- São Tomé scops owl
- Pemba scops owl
- White-fronted scops owl
- Rufous fishing owl
- Long-whiskered owlet

== Trogoniformes ==
Trogons

- Javan trogon
- Cinnamon-rumped trogon

== Bucerotiformes ==
Hornbills and hoopoes

- Rufous-necked hornbill
- Black hornbill
- Palawan hornbill
- Great hornbill
- Rufous hornbill
- Southern rufous hornbill
- Rhinoceros hornbill
- Northern ground hornbill
- Southern ground hornbill
- Brown-cheeked hornbill
- Yellow-casqued hornbill
- Malabar grey hornbill
- Sulawesi hornbill
- Wreathed hornbill
- Knobbed hornbill
- Narcondam hornbill
- Plain-pouched hornbill

== Coraciiformes ==
Kingfishers and allies

- Short-legged ground roller
- Bismarck kingfisher
- Keel-billed motmot
- Scaly ground roller
- Black-capped kingfisher
- Pohnpei kingfisher
- Winchell's kingfisher
- Moorea kingfisher (sometimes considered subspecies of Society kingfisher)
- Long-tailed ground roller

== Piciformes ==
(Woodpeckers, toucans, and barbets)

- Scarlet-banded barbet
- Helmeted woodpecker
- Kaempfer's woodpecker
- Andaman woodpecker
- Pale-throated barbet
- Chaplin's barbet
- Southern sooty woodpecker
- Great slaty woodpecker
- Sulu pygmy woodpecker

== Falconiformes ==
Falcons and caracaras

- Seychelles kestrel
- Sooty falcon
- Taita falcon
- Grey falcon
- Red-footed falcon
- Plumbeous forest falcon

== Psittaciformes ==
Parrots

=== Strigopidae ===
New Zealand parrots

- New Zealand kaka

=== Cacatuidae ===
Cockatoos

- Blue-eyed cockatoo

=== Psittacidae ===
African & New World parrots

- Red-necked amazon
- Yellow-billed amazon
- Saint Vincent amazon
- Red-spectacled amazon
- Tucumán amazon
- Hispaniolan amazon
- Saint Lucia amazon
- Hyacinth macaw
- Military macaw
- Rufous-fronted parakeet
- Grey-cheeked parakeet
- Orange-fronted parakeet
- Yellow-faced parrotlet
- Golden parakeet
- Yellow-eared parrot
- Green-thighed parrot
- Blue-headed macaw
- Hispaniolan parakeet
- Cuban parakeet
- White-breasted parakeet
- Flame-winged parakeet
- Ochre-marked parakeet
- Azuero parakeet
- Pearly parakeet
- Golden-tailed parrotlet

=== Psittaculidae ===
Old World parrots

- Black-cheeked lovebird
- Seychelles black parrot
- Lesser vasa parrot
- Chatham parakeet
- Antipodes parakeet
- Tanimbar eclectus
- Horned parakeet
- Ouvea parakeet
- Flores hanging-parrot
- Chattering lory
- Blue-winged parrot
- Mindoro racket-tail
- Blue-headed racket-tail
- Echo parakeet
- Pesquet's parrot
- Black-lored parrot
- Biak lorikeet
- Blue lorikeet
- Stephen's lorikeet

== Passeriformes ==
Passerines

=== Petroicidae ===
Australasian robins

- Black robin

=== Philepittidae ===
Asities

- Yellow-bellied sunbird-asity
- Schlegel's asity

=== Eurylaimidae ===
Broadbills

- Grauer's broadbill
- Visayan broadbill
- Wattled broadbill

=== Pittidae ===
Pittas

- Blue-headed pitta
- Fairy pitta
- Azure-breasted pitta

=== Furnariidae ===
Ovenbirds

- Santa Marta foliage-gleaner
- Bolivian spinetail
- Campo miner
- Uniform woodcreeper
- Ceara leaftosser
- Blackish-headed spinetail
- Russet-bellied spinetail
- Delta Amacuro spinetail
- Orinoco softtail
- Atlantic woodcreeper
- Moustached woodcreeper

=== Thamnophilidae ===
Antbirds

- White-bearded antshrike
- Rio Branco antbird
- Plumbeous antvireo
- Sincora antwren
- Ash-throated antwren
- Pectoral antwren
- Rondonia warbling antbird
- Klages's antwren
- Band-tailed antwren
- Allpahuayo antbird
- Bare-eyed antbird
- Maranon antshrike

=== Grallariidae ===
Antpittas

- Moustached antpitta
- Santa Marta antpitta
- Giant antpitta
- Brown-banded antpitta
- Sucre antpitta
- Ochre-fronted antpitta
- Masked antpitta

=== Rhinocryptidae ===
Tapaculos

- Marsh tapaculo

=== Tyrannidae ===
Tyrant flycatchers

- White-tailed shrike-tyrant
- Strange-tailed tyrant
- Cock-tailed tyrant
- Ash-breasted tit-tyrant
- Tawny-chested flycatcher
- Rufous twistwing
- Noronha elaenia
- Kaempfer's tody-tyrant
- Buff-breasted tody-tyrant
- Rufous flycatcher
- Cocos flycatcher
- Antioquia bristle tyrant
- Russet-winged spadebill
- Black-and-white monjita

=== Cotingidae ===
Cotingas

- Long-wattled umbrellabird
- Turquoise cotinga
- Grey-winged cotinga
- Scimitar-winged piha
- Peruvian plantcutter
- Three-wattled bellbird
- White-winged cotinga

=== Pipridae ===
Manakins

- Yellow-headed manakin
- Opal-crowned manakin

=== Tityridae ===
Tityras, becards, and allies

- Slaty becard

=== Onychorhynchidae ===
Royal flycatchers and allies

- Atlantic royal flycatcher

=== Maluridae ===
Australasian wrens

- Kalkadoon grasswren
- Carpentarian grasswren

=== Meliphagidae ===
Honeyeaters

- MacGregor's honeyeater
- Long-bearded honeyeater
- Strong-billed honeyeater
- Bacan myzomela
- Rotuma myzomela
- Alor myzomela

=== Dasyornithidae ===
Bristlebirds

- Eastern bristlebird

=== Notiomystidae ===
Stitchbird (monotypic)

- Stitchbird

=== Platysteiridae ===
Wattle-eyes and batises

- Banded wattle-eye

=== Malaconotidae ===
Bushshrikes

- Green-breasted bushshrike

=== Vangidae ===
Vangas and allies

- Red-shouldered vanga
- Red-tailed newtonia
- Bernier's vanga
- Yellow-crested helmetshrike
- Pollen's vanga

=== Pityriasidae ===
Bristlehead (monotypic)

- Bornean bristlehead

=== Campephagidae ===
Cuckooshrikes and allies

- Black-bibbed cicadabird
- White-winged cuckooshrike
- Mauritius cuckooshrike
- Western wattled cuckooshrike

=== Pachycephalidae ===
Whistlers and allies

- Bower's shrikethrush
- Red-lored whistler

=== Vireonidae ===
Vireos

- San Andres vireo

=== Oriolidae ===
Figbirds, Old World orioles, piopios

- São Tomé oriole

=== Dicruridae ===
Drongos

- Mayotte drongo

=== Rhipiduridae ===
Fantails

- Natewa silktail
- Malaita fantail
- Manus fantail

=== Monarchidae ===
Monarchs

- Oʻahu ʻelepaio
- Celestial monarch
- Vanikoro monarch
- Rarotonga monarch
- Seychelles paradise-flycatcher

=== Corvidae ===
Crows, jays, and allies

- Florida scrub jay
- Island scrub jay
- White-necked crow
- White-throated jay
- Lidth's jay
- Pinyon jay
- Sichuan jay
- Sri Lanka blue magpie

=== Paradisaeidae ===
Birds-of-paradise

- Goldie's bird-of-paradise
- Blue bird-of-paradise

=== Picathartidae ===
Rockfowl

- White-necked rockfowl
- Grey-necked rockfowl

=== Alaudidae ===
Larks

- Red lark
- Dupont's lark
- Rudd's lark

=== Pycnonotidae ===
Bulbuls

- Grey-cheeked bulbul
- Yellow-bearded greenbul
- Mauritius bulbul
- Styan's bulbul
- Yellow-throated bulbul
- Hook-billed bulbul

=== Hirundinidae ===
Swallows and martins

- Blue swallow
- White-tailed swallow
- Peruvian martin
- Sinaloa martin
- Golden swallow

=== Phylloscopidae ===
Leaf warblers

- Kolombangara leaf warbler
- Hainan leaf warbler
- Ijima's leaf warbler

=== Acrocephalidae ===
Reed warblers and allies

- Tahiti reed warbler
- Aquatic warbler
- Nauru reed warbler
- Rimatara reed warbler
- Henderson reed warbler
- Manchurian reed warbler
- Papyrus yellow warbler

=== Locustellidae ===
Grassbirds and allies

- Grauer's swamp warbler
- Knysna warbler
- Bristled grassbird
- New Britain thicketbird
- Styan's grasshopper warbler
- Fly River grassbird
- Cordillera ground warbler
- Broad-tailed grassbird

=== Bernieridae ===
Tetrakas and allies

- Appert's tetraka

=== Cisticolidae ===
Cisticolas and allies

- White-winged apalis
- Kabobo apalis
- Karamoja apalis
- Winifred's warbler
- Grey-crowned prinia
- Sierra Leone prinia

=== Sylviidae ===
Sylviid babblers

- Yemen warbler

=== Paradoxornithidae ===
Parrotbills and allies

- Jerdon's babbler
- Black-breasted parrotbill
- Przevalski's parrotbill
- Grey-hooded parrotbill
- Black-headed parrotbill

=== Zosteropidae ===
White-eyes

- Fernando Po speirops
- Annobón white-eye
- Gizo white-eye
- Mount Cameroon speirops
- Seychelles white-eye
- Karthala white-eye
- Samoan white-eye
- Taita white-eye
- South Pare white-eye

=== Timaliidae ===
Old World babblers

- Rusty-throated wren-babbler
- Naga wren-babbler
- Pale-throated wren-babbler
- Tawny-breasted wren-babbler
- Nonggang babbler
- Snowy-throated babbler

=== Pellorneidae ===
Ground babblers

- Golden-fronted fulvetta
- Marsh babbler
- Falcated wren-babbler
- Bornean wren-babbler

=== Leiothrichidae ===
Laughingthrushes and allies

- Slender-billed babbler
- Sumatran laughingthrush
- White-speckled laughingthrush
- Ashy-headed laughingthrush
- Chestnut-eared laughingthrush
- Golden-winged laughingthrush
- Snowy-cheeked laughingthrush
- Emei Shan liocichla
- Hinde's babbler

=== Troglodytidae ===
Wrens

- Nava's wren
- Cobb's wren
- Clarión wren

=== Sittidae ===
Nuthatches

- Beautiful nuthatch
- Corsican nuthatch

=== Mimidae ===
Mockingbirds and thrashers

- Española mockingbird
- Bendire's thrasher

=== Sturnidae ===
Starlings

- Pale-bellied myna
- Rarotonga starling
- Mountain starling
- Abbott's starling
- White-faced starling

=== Turdidae ===
Thrushes

- Bicknell's thrush
- Rufous-brown solitaire
- Javan cochoa
- Sumatran cochoa
- Ashy thrush
- ʻŌmaʻo
- Izu thrush
- Grey-sided thrush
- Somali thrush
- La Selle thrush
- Spotted ground thrush
- Guadalcanal thrush

=== Muscicapidae ===
Old World flycatchers

- White-headed robin-chat
- Sunda blue flycatcher
- Little slaty flycatcher
- Palawan flycatcher
- Kashmir flycatcher
- Blackthroat
- Nimba flycatcher
- Dapple-throat
- Chapin's flycatcher
- Ashy-breasted flycatcher
- Brown-chested jungle flycatcher
- White-browed jungle flycatcher
- White-throated bush chat
- White-browed bush chat
- Iringa akalat
- Swynnerton's robin

=== Cinclidae ===
Dippers

- Rufous-throated dipper

=== Chloropseidae ===
Leafbirds

- Philippine leafbird

=== Dicaeidae ===
Flowerpeckers

- Black-belted flowerpecker
- Scarlet-collared flowerpecker

=== Nectariniidae ===
Sunbirds

- Elegant sunbird
- Banded green sunbird
- Rockefeller's sunbird
- Rufous-winged sunbird
- Giant sunbird

=== Passeridae ===
Old World sparrows

- Abd al-Kuri sparrow

=== Ploceidae ===
Weavers

- Bannerman's weaver
- Kilombero weaver
- Yellow-legged weaver
- Finn's weaver
- Loango weaver

=== Estrildidae ===
Waxbills, munias, and allies

- Green avadavat
- Pink-billed parrotfinch
- Diamond firetail

=== Motacillidae ===
Wagtails and pipits

- São Tomé shorttail
- Yellow-breasted pipit
- Ochre-breasted pipit
- Nilgiri pipit
- Sprague's pipit

=== Fringillidae ===
Finches and euphonias

- Ankober serin
- ʻIʻiwi
- Evening grosbeak
- Syrian serin
- Yellow-faced siskin
- Laysan finch

=== Passerellidae ===
New World sparrows

- Guadalupe junco
- Yellow-green finch

=== Calyptophilidae ===
Chat-tanagers

- Western chat-tanager

=== Phaenicophilidae ===
Hispaniolan palm-tanagers

- White-winged warbler

=== Nesospingidae ===
Puerto Rican tanager (monotypic)

- Puerto Rican tanager

=== Icteridae ===
Oropendolas, blackbirds, and New World orioles

- Forbes's blackbird
- Rusty blackbird
- Red-bellied grackle
- Martinique oriole
- Pampas meadowlark
- Bauda oropendola

=== Parulidae ===
New World warblers

- Pirre warbler
- Black-polled yellowthroat
- Barbuda warbler

=== Thraupidae ===
Tanagers and allies

- Yellow-green tanager
- Masked mountain tanager
- Large tree finch
- Green warbler finch
- Yellow-green bush tanager
- Pearly-breasted conebill
- Black-masked finch
- Little Inca finch
- Puerto Rican bullfinch
- Inaccessible Island finch
- Nightingale Island finch
- White-capped tanager
- Chestnut seedeater
- Temminck's seedeater
- Buffy-fronted seedeater
- Black-and-tawny seedeater
- Straw-backed tanager
- Azure-rumped tanager
- Seven-coloured tanager
- Black-backed tanager
- Orange-throated tanager

== See also ==
- Lists of IUCN Red List vulnerable species
- List of least concern birds
- List of near threatened birds
- List of endangered birds
- List of critically endangered birds
- List of extinct bird species since 1500
- List of data deficient birds
