= List of critically endangered birds =

- Extinct in the wild (EW): 5 species
- Critically endangered (CR): 216 species
- Endangered (EN): 372 species
- Vulnerable (VU): 670 species
- Near threatened (NT): 967 species
- Least concern (LC): 8,767 species
- Data deficient (DD): 37 species
Avian species (IUCN, 2025-2)
- 11,198 extant species have been evaluated
- 11,161 of those are fully assessed (Note: excludes data deficient evaluations.)
- 9,734 are not threatened at present (Note: NT and LC.)
- 1,427 to 1,464 are threatened (Note: Threatened comprises CR, EN and VU. Upper estimate additionally includes DD.)
- 169 to 187 are extinct or extinct in the wild:
  - 164 extinct (EX) species (Note: Chart omits extinct (EX) species)
  - 5 extinct in the wild (EW)
  - 18 possibly extinct [CR(PE)]

Critically endangered (CR) species face an extremely high risk of extinction in the wild.

As of December 2019, the International Union for Conservation of Nature (IUCN) listed 223 critically endangered avian species, including 19 which are tagged as possibly extinct or possibly extinct in the wild. 2% of all evaluated avian species are listed as critically endangered. No subpopulations of birds have been evaluated by the IUCN.

Additionally 55 avian species (0.48% of those evaluated) are listed as data deficient, meaning there is insufficient information for a full assessment of conservation status. As these species typically have small distributions and/or populations, they are intrinsically likely to be threatened, according to the IUCN. While the category of data deficient indicates that no assessment of extinction risk has been made for the taxa, the IUCN notes that it may be appropriate to give them "the same degree of attention as threatened taxa, at least until their status can be assessed".

This is a complete list of critically endangered avian species evaluated by the IUCN. Species considered possibly extinct by the IUCN are marked as such. Where possible common names for taxa are given while links point to the scientific name used by the IUCN.

== Anseriformes ==
Ducks, geese, swans, screamers

- Laysan duck
- White-winged duck
- Baer's pochard
- Madagascan pochard
- Brazilian merganser
- Pink-headed duck (possibly extinct)
- Crested shelduck (possibly extinct)

== Galliformes ==
Landfowl

- Blue-billed curassow
- Belem curassow (subspecies, bare-faced curassow)
- Edwards's pheasant (possibly extinct in the wild)
- Malay crestless fireback
- Maleo
- Himalayan quail
- Sira curassow
- Manipur bush quail
- Trinidad piping guan
- Djibouti francolin
- Crested argus
- New Caledonian buttonquail (possibly extinct)
- Buff-breasted buttonquail

== Podicipediformes ==
Grebes

- Hooded grebe

== Columbiformes ==
Pigeons and doves

- Polynesian ground dove
- Purple-winged ground dove
- Silvery pigeon
- Blue-eyed ground dove
- Tooth-billed pigeon
- Negros bleeding-heart
- Sulu bleeding-heart
- Mindoro bleeding-heart
- Grenada dove
- Black-naped pheasant-pigeon (considered a subspecies of pheasant pigeon by IOC taxonomy)
- Negros fruit dove
- Rapa fruit dove

== Otidiformes ==
Bustards

- Great Indian bustard
- Lesser florican
- Bengal florican

== Cuculiformes ==
Cuckoos

- Black-hooded coucal

== Gruiformes ==
Cranes, rails, trumpeters, and finfoots

- Zapata rail
- New Caledonian rail (possibly extinct)
- Guam rail
- Siberian crane
- Samoan woodhen (possibly extinct)
- Makira woodhen (possibly extinct)
- White-winged flufftail
- Masked finfoot
- Black-winged trumpeter

== Charadriiformes ==
Shorebirds and gulls

- Spoon-billed sandpiper
- Southern red-breasted plover (subspecies, New Zealand dotterel)
- Black stilt
- Eskimo curlew (possibly extinct)
- Jerdon's courser
- Chinese crested tern
- Buff-breasted buttonquail
- Sociable lapwing
- Javan lapwing (possibly extinct)

== Aegotheliformes ==
Owlet-nightjars

- New Caledonian owlet-nightjar (possibly extinct)

== Caprimulgiformes ==
Nightjars

- New Caledonian nightjar (possibly extinct)
- Jamaican poorwill (possibly extinct)

== Apodiformes ==
Hummingbirds and swifts

- Santa Marta sabrewing
- Turquoise-throated puffleg (possibly extinct)
- Gorgeted puffleg
- Chilean woodstar
- Short-crested coquette
- Juan Fernández firecrown

== Sphenisciformes ==
Penguins

- African penguin

== Procellariiformes ==
Petrels, albatrosses, and shearwaters

- Tristan albatross
- New Zealand storm petrel
- Guadalupe storm petrel (possibly extinct)
- MacGillivray's prion
- Waved albatross
- Mascarene petrel
- Beck's petrel
- Fiji petrel
- Jamaican petrel (possibly extinct)
- Magenta petrel
- Galápagos petrel
- Townsend's shearwater
- Bryan's shearwater
- Rapa shearwater
- Newell's shearwater
- Balearic shearwater

== Suliformes ==
Cormorants and allies

- Chatham shag

== Pelecaniformes ==
Pelicans, ibises, and herons

- White-bellied heron
- São Tomé ibis
- White-shouldered ibis
- Giant ibis

== Accipitriformes ==
Hawks, eagles, kites, and vultures

- Ridgway's hawk
- Cuban kite
- California condor
- White-backed vulture
- White-rumped vulture
- Indian vulture
- Rüppell's vulture
- Slender-billed vulture
- Madagascan fish eagle
- Hooded vulture
- Philippine eagle
- Red-headed vulture
- White-headed vulture

== Strigiformes ==
Owls

- Pernambuco pygmy owl (possibly extinct)
- Principe scops owl
- Seychelles scops owl
- Siau scops owl

== Bucerotiformes ==
Hornbills and hoopoes

- Sulu hornbill
- Helmeted hornbill

== Coraciiformes ==
Kingfishers and allies

- Javan blue-banded kingfisher
- Sangihe dwarf kingfisher
- Mangareva kingfisher
- Marquesan kingfisher

== Piciformes ==
Woodpeckers, toucans, and barbets

- Imperial woodpecker (possibly extinct)
- Ivory-billed woodpecker (possibly extinct)

== Psittaciformes ==
Parrots

=== Strigopidae ===
New Zealand parrots

- Kākāpō

=== Cacatuidae ===
Cockatoos

- Red-vented cockatoo
- Yellow-crested cockatoo
- Baudin's black cockatoo

=== Psittacidae ===
African & New World parrots

- Imperial amazon
- Lilicine amazon
- Puerto Rican amazon
- Yellow-naped amazon
- Glaucous macaw (possibly extinct)
- Great green macaw
- Blue-throated macaw
- Red-fronted macaw
- Sinú parakeet (possibly extinct)

=== Psittaculidae ===
Old World parrots

- Red-throated lorikeet
- New Caledonian lorikeet (possibly extinct)
- Malherbe's parakeet
- Coxen's fig parrot
- Swift parrot
- Orange-bellied parrot
- Night parrot
- Blue-winged racket-tail
- Ultramarine lorikeet

== Passeriformes ==
Passerines

=== Pittidae ===
Pittas

- Gurney's pitta

=== Furnariidae ===
Ovenbirds

- White-bellied cinclodes
- Masafuera rayadito
- Marañón spinetail

=== Thamnophilidae ===
Antbirds

- Marsh antwren
- Alagoas antwren
- Orange-bellied antwren

=== Grallariidae ===
Antpittas

- Táchira antpitta
- Urrao antpitta

=== Rhinocryptidae ===
Tapaculos

- Stresemann's bristlefront

=== Tyrannidae ===
Tyrant flycatchers

- Kinglet calyptura (possibly extinct)
- Alagoas tyrannulet

=== Cotingidae ===
Cotingas

- Banded cotinga
- Chestnut-capped piha

=== Pipridae ===
Manakins

- Araripe manakin

=== Meliphagidae ===
Honeyeaters

- Regent honeyeater
- Crow honeyeater

=== Callaeidae ===
New Zealand wattlebirds

- South Island kokako (possibly extinct)

=== Campephagidae ===
Cuckooshrikes

- Réunion cuckooshrike

=== Pachycephalidae ===
Whistlers and allies

- Sangihe whistler

=== Oriolidae ===
Figbirds, Old World orioles, piopios

- Isabela oriole

=== Monarchidae ===
Monarchs

- Cerulean paradise flycatcher
- Iphis monarch
- Ua Pou monarch (possibly extinct)
- Tahiti monarch
- Fatu Hiva monarch
- Black-chinned monarch

=== Laniidae ===
Shrikes

- São Tomé fiscal

=== Corvidae ===
Crows, jays, and allies

- Javan green magpie
- Mariana crow
- Banggai crow

=== Alaudidae ===
Larks

- Raso lark
- Archer's lark

=== Pycnonotidae ===
Bulbuls

- Straw-headed bulbul

=== Hirundinidae ===
Swallows and martins

- White-eyed river martin

=== Acrocephalidae ===
Reed warblers and allies

- Moorea reed warbler (possibly extinct)
- Rimatara reed warbler
- Speckled reed warbler

=== Cisticolidae ===
Cisticolas and allies

- Taita apalis
- Long-billed forest warbler

=== Zosteropidae ===
White-eyes

- Mauritius olive white-eye
- Sangihe white-eye
- Rota white-eye

=== Leiothrichidae ===
Laughingthrushes and allies

- Bugun liocichla
- Blue-crowned laughingthrush

=== Troglodytidae ===
Wrens

- Niceforo's wren
- Santa Marta wren

=== Mimidae ===
Mockingbirds and thrashers

- Socorro mockingbird
- Cozumel thrasher

=== Sturnidae ===
Starlings

- Pohnpei starling (possibly extinct)
- Nias hill myna (sometimes regarded as subspecies of Common hill myna)
- Bali myna

=== Turdidae ===
Thrushes

- Olomaʻo (possibly extinct)
- Puaiohi
- Príncipe thrush

=== Muscicapidae ===
Old World flycatchers

- Javan blue flycatcher
- Rück's blue flycatcher

=== Dicaeidae ===
Flowerpeckers

- Cebu flowerpecker

=== Fringillidae ===
Finches and euphonias

- São Tomé grosbeak
- Palila
- ‘Akeke‘e
- ʻAkikiki
- ʻAkohekohe
- Oʻahu ʻalauahio (possibly extinct)
- Maui parrotbill
- Nihoa finch

=== Emberizidae ===
Buntings

- Yellow-breasted bunting

=== Passerellidae ===
New World Sparrows

- Antioquia brush finch

=== Parulidae ===
New World warblers

- Semper's warbler
- Bachman's warbler (possibly extinct)

=== Thraupidae ===
Tanagers and allies

- Mangrove finch
- Medium tree finch
- St. Kitts bullfinch (possibly extinct)
- Cherry-throated tanager
- Wilkins's finch
- Gough finch

== See also ==
- Lists of IUCN Red List critically endangered species
- List of least concern birds
- List of near threatened birds
- List of vulnerable birds
- List of endangered birds
- List of extinct bird species since 1500
- List of data deficient birds
