= List of data deficient birds =

- Extinct in the wild (EW): 5 species
- Critically endangered (CR): 216 species
- Endangered (EN): 372 species
- Vulnerable (VU): 670 species
- Near threatened (NT): 967 species
- Least concern (LC): 8,767 species
- Data deficient (DD): 37 species
Avian species (IUCN, 2025-2)
- 11,198 extant species have been evaluated
- 11,161 of those are fully assessed (Note: excludes data deficient evaluations.)
- 9,734 are not threatened at present (Note: NT and LC.)
- 1,427 to 1,464 are threatened (Note: Threatened comprises CR, EN and VU. Upper estimate additionally includes DD.)
- 169 to 187 are extinct or extinct in the wild:
  - 164 extinct (EX) species (Note: Chart omits extinct (EX) species)
  - 5 extinct in the wild (EW)
  - 18 possibly extinct [CR(PE)]

As of June 2026, the International Union for Conservation of Nature (IUCN) lists 36 data deficient avian species.

This is a complete list of data deficient avian species evaluated by the IUCN. Where possible common names for taxa are given while links point to the scientific name used by the IUCN.

== Galliformes ==
Landfowl

- Dulit partridge

== Caprimulgiformes ==
Nightjars

- Prigogine's nightjar
- Cayenne nightjar

== Apodiformes ==
Hummingbirds and swifts

- Mayr's swiftlet
- Papuan swiftlet
- Whitehead's swiftlet
- Fernando Po swift
- White-fronted swift
- Letitia's thorntail

== Gruiformes ==
Cranes, rails, finfoots, and trumpeters

- Brown-banded rail
- Colombian crake

== Charadriiformes ==
Shorebirds and gulls

- Luzon buttonquail

== Procellariiformes ==
Petrels, albatrosses, and shearwaters

- New Caledonia storm petrel
- Elliot's storm petrel
- Pincoya storm petrel

== Strigiformes ==
Owls

- Itombwe owl

== Coraciiformes ==
Kingfishers and allies

- Little paradise kingfisher

== Psittaciformes ==
Parrots

- Blue-fronted lorikeet

== Passeriformes ==
Passerines

- Black-headed rufous warbler
- Sillem's mountain finch
- Prigogine's greenbul
- Tana River cisticola
- Dusky tetraka
- Spectacled flowerpecker
- Duida grass-finch
- Louisiade pitta
- Black-lored waxbill
- Eastern wattled cuckooshrike
- Friedmann's lark
- White-chinned myzomela
- Sombre rock chat
- Javan oriole
- Red Sea cliff swallow
- Blue-wattled bulbul
- Philippa's crombec
- White-tailed tityra

== See also ==
- Lists of IUCN Red List data deficient species
- List of least concern birds
- List of near threatened birds
- List of vulnerable birds
- List of endangered birds
- List of critically endangered birds
- List of recently extinct birds
