= Lists of IUCN Red List species =

This is a list of lists of IUCN Red List species.

== Critically endangered ==
Version 2026.1 of the IUCN Red List of Threatened Species identified 10,947 critically endangered species, subspecies, varieties, stocks, and subpopulations.

For IUCN lists of critically endangered species by kingdom, see:

- Animals (kingdom Animalia) — IUCN Red List critically endangered species (Animalia)
  - Amphibians — List of critically endangered amphibians
  - Birds — List of critically endangered birds
  - Fish — List of critically endangered fishes
  - Invertebrates — List of critically endangered invertebrates
    - Arthropods — List of critically endangered arthropods
      - Insects — List of critically endangered insects
    - Molluscs List of critically endangered molluscs
  - Mammals — List of critically endangered mammals
  - Reptiles — List of critically endangered reptiles
- Fungi (kingdom Fungi) — List of fungi by conservation status
- Plants (kingdom Plantae) — List of critically endangered plants
- Protists (various groups) — List of Chromista by conservation status

== Data deficient ==
As of 7 September 2026, the IUCN Red List of Threatened Species identified 23,037 (16,339 Animalia (193 Annelida, 4,910 Arthropoda, 8,659 Chordata, 149 Cnidaria, 2,149 Mollusca, 1 Nemertea, 1 Onychophora), 6,393 Plantae, 12 Protista) data deficient species.

- Animals
  - Amphibians — List of data deficient amphibians
  - Birds — List of data deficient birds
  - Fish — List of data deficient fishes
  - Invertebrates — List of data deficient invertebrates
    - Arthropods — List of data deficient arthropods
      - Insects — List of data deficient insects
    - Molluscs List of data deficient molluscs
  - Mammals — List of data deficient mammals
  - Reptiles — List of data deficient reptiles
- Plants — List of data deficient plants
- Chromista/Protista — List of Chromista by conservation status (12 data deficient species)
- Fungi — List of fungi by conservation status (293 data deficient species)

=== Older lists (IUCN 2009.2) ===
- Cnidaria — IUCN Red List data deficient species (Cnidaria)
- Nemertea — IUCN Red List data deficient species (Nemertea)
- Onychophora — IUCN Red List data deficient species (Onychophora)
- Protista — IUCN Red List data deficient species (Protista)

== Endangered ==
As of 8 September 2026, the IUCN Red List of Threatened Species identified 20,372 (7,252 animals, 130 fungi, 12,989 plants, 1 chromista) endangered species, subspecies and varieties, stocks and sub-populations.

For IUCN lists of endangered species by kingdom, see:

- Animals (kingdom Animalia) — IUCN Red List endangered species (Animalia)
  - Amphibians — List of endangered amphibians
  - Birds — List of endangered birds
  - Fish — List of endangered fishes
  - Invertebrates — List of endangered invertebrates
    - Arthropods — List of endangered arthropods
      - Insects — List of endangered insects
    - Molluscs List of endangered molluscs
  - Mammals — List of endangered mammals
  - Reptiles — List of endangered reptiles
- Fungi (kingdom Fungi) — IUCN Red List endangered species (Fungi)
- Plants (kingdom Plantae) — IUCN Red List endangered species (Plantae)
- Protists (kingdom Protista) — IUCN Red List endangered species (Protista)

== Extinct in the wild ==
Version 2026.1 of the IUCN Red List of Threatened Species identified 83 (36 animals, 47 plants) extinct in the wild species, subspecies and varieties, stocks and subpopulations.

For IUCN lists of extinct in the wild species by kingdom, see:

- Animals (kingdom Animalia) — IUCN Red List extinct in the wild species (Animalia)
- Plants (kingdom Plantae) — IUCN Red List extinct in the wild species (Plantae)

== Least concern ==
As of 8 September 2026, the IUCN Red List identified 91,517 (54,433 animals, 36,550 plants, 534 fungi) Least-concern species, subspecies and varieties, stocks and sub-populations.

- Animals (kingdom Animalia)
  - Amphibians — List of least concern amphibians
  - Birds — List of least concern birds
  - Fish — List of least concern fishes
  - Invertebrates — List of least concern invertebrates
    - Arthropods — List of least concern arthropods
      - Insects — List of least concern insects
    - Molluscs List of least concern molluscs
  - Mammals — List of least concern mammals
  - Reptiles — List of least concern reptiles
- Plants (kingdom Plantae) — List of least concern plants

== Near threatened ==
On 12 March 2010, the IUCN Red List of Threatened Species identified 3829 (2657 Animalia, 1172 Plantae) near threatened species, subspecies and varieties, stocks and sub-populations.

For IUCN lists of near threatened species by kingdom, see:

- Animals (kingdom Animalia) — IUCN Red List near threatened species (Animalia)
  - Amphibians — List of near threatened amphibians
  - Birds — List of near threatened birds
  - Fish — List of near threatened fishes
  - Invertebrates — List of near threatened invertebrates
    - Arthropods — List of near threatened arthropods
      - Insects — List of near threatened insects
    - Molluscs List of near threatened molluscs
  - Mammals — List of near threatened mammals
  - Reptiles — List of near threatened reptiles
- Fungi (kingdom Fungi) — IUCN Red List near threatened species (Fungi)
- Plants (kingdom Plantae) — IUCN Red List near threatened species (Plantae)

== Vulnerable ==
On 30 January 2010, the IUCN Red List of Threatened Species identified 9694 (4618 Animalia, 5075 Plantae, 1 Protista) Vulnerable species, subspecies and varieties, stocks and sub-populations.

For IUCN lists of vulnerable species by kingdom, see:

- Animals (kingdom Animalia) — IUCN Red List vulnerable species (Animalia)
  - Amphibians — List of vulnerable amphibians
  - Birds — List of vulnerable birds
  - Fish — List of vulnerable fishes
  - Invertebrates — List of vulnerable invertebrates
    - Arthropods — List of vulnerable arthropods
      - Insects — List of vulnerable insects
    - Molluscs List of vulnerable molluscs
  - Mammals — List of vulnerable mammals
  - Reptiles — List of vulnerable reptiles
- Fungi (kingdom Fungi) — IUCN Red List vulnerable species (Fungi)
- Plants (kingdom Plantae) — IUCN Red List vulnerable species (Plantae)
- Protists (kingdom Protista) — IUCN Red List vulnerable species (Protista)

== See also ==
- IUCN Red List conservation dependent species
- List of Chromista by conservation status
- List of fungi by conservation status
- List of recovering species
- The World's 25 Most Endangered Primates
- Category:IUCN Red List critically endangered species
- Category:IUCN Red List least concern species
