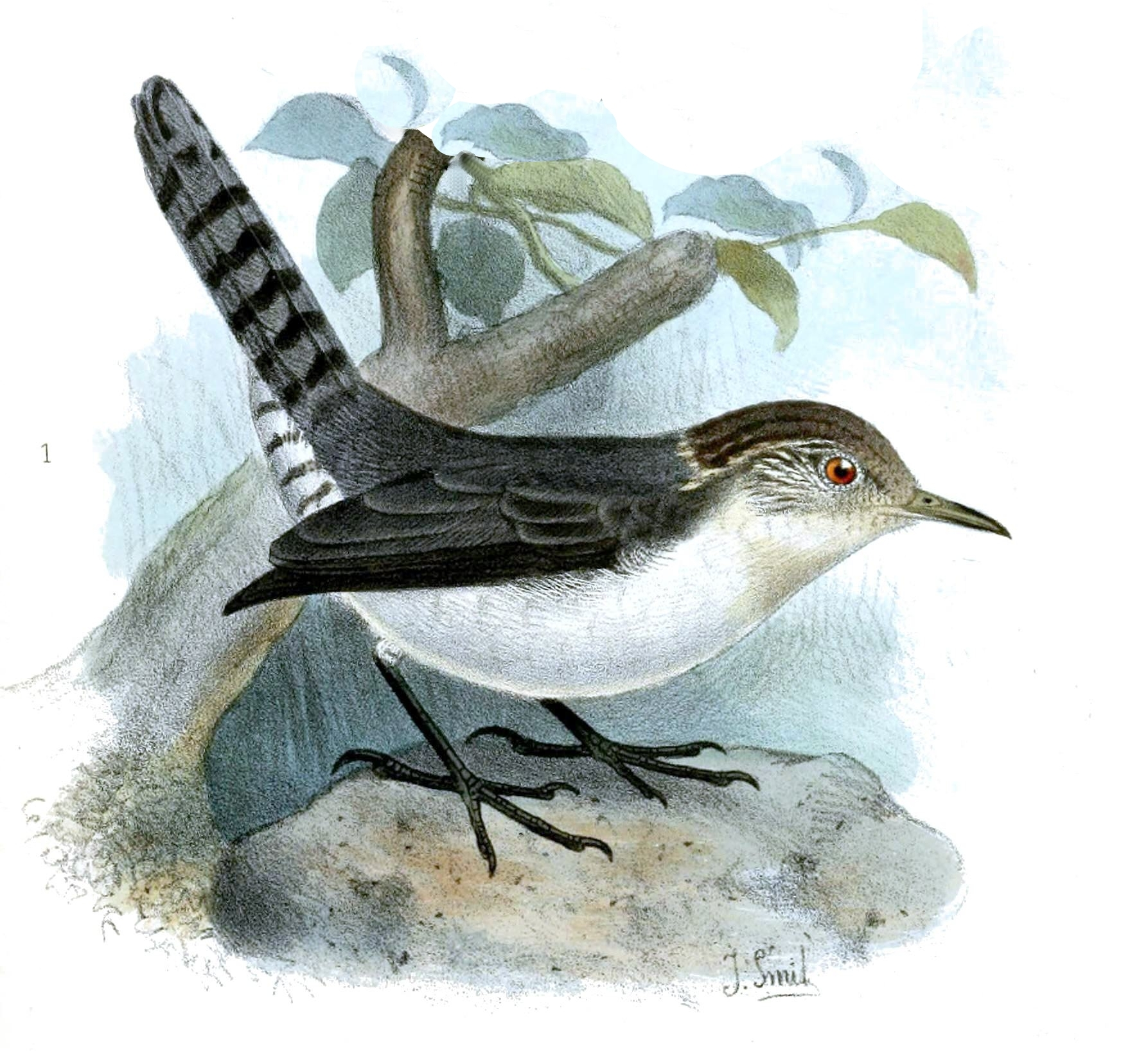
- Grey-mantled wren (Odontorchilus branickii)

Scientific classification
- Kingdom: Animalia
- Phylum: Chordata
- Class: Aves
- Order: Passeriformes
- Family: Troglodytidae
- Genus: Odontorchilus; Richmond, 1915

Type species
- Odontorhynchus cinereus von Pelzeln, 1868

= Odontorchilus =

Genus of birds

Odontorchilus is a small genus of South American birds in the family Troglodytidae. These small grey wrens are relatively long-tailed (giving them a superficially gnatcatcher-like appearance), and, uniquely in the family, they live in the canopy and subcanopy of humid forest, with one species associated with forest growing on the east Andean slope and the other with the Amazon rainforest.

It contains the following two species:

Image	Common name	Scientific name
	Grey-mantled wren	Odontorchilus branickii
	Tooth-billed wren	Odontorchilus cinereus
