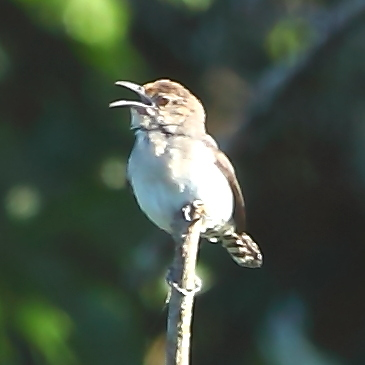
- at Alta Floresta, Mato Grosso State, Brazil

Conservation status
- Least Concern (IUCN 3.1)

Scientific classification
- Kingdom: Animalia
- Phylum: Chordata
- Class: Aves
- Order: Passeriformes
- Family: Troglodytidae
- Genus: Odontorchilus
- Species: O. cinereus

Binomial name
- Odontorchilus cinereus (Pelzeln, 1868)

= Tooth-billed wren =

Species of bird

The tooth-billed wren (Odontorchilus cinereus) is a species of bird in the family Troglodytidae. It is found in Bolivia and Brazil.

== Taxonomy and systematics ==
The tooth-billed wren shares its genus with one other species, the grey-mantled wren (Odontorchilus branickii). Some authors have suggested that they are conspecific or that they form a superspecies. The tooth-billed wren is monotypic.

== Description ==
The tooth-billed wren is 12 cm (4.7 in) long; one male weighed 11 g (0.39 oz). Adults have a grayish cinnamon crown, a grayish brown face, and a medium gray back. Their throat and breast are buffy gray, the belly pale buff, and the flanks grayish white. The juvenile looks essentially the same.

== Distribution and habitat ==
The tooth-billed wren is found mostly in Brazil but its range extends slightly into Bolivia's Santa Cruz Department. It is found south of the Amazon River between the Madeira River on the west and the Xingú River on the east. It inhabits tall humid lowland forest at elevations up to 600 m (2,000 ft).

== Behavior ==
=== Feeding ===
The tooth-billed wren's diet is not known in detail, but the species is insectivorous. It forages in the canopy, 15 to 30 m (49 to 98 ft) above ground, exploring and probing the foliage along branches and in vine tangles. It usually is part of a mixed-species foraging flock.

=== Breeding ===
The tooth-billed wren's breeding season appears to span from June to September based on dates when active nests, dependent juveniles, and physiological evidence have been observed. It nests in a cavity in a limb or trunk high above the ground. The clutch size is believed to be two.

=== Vocalization ===
The tooth-billed wren's typical song is "a short, simple trill" ; both sexes sing it.

== Status ==
The IUCN has assessed the tooth-billed wren to be of Least Concern. The species' population has not been quantified and is "suspected to decline by a rate approaching 30% over three generations.'
