= IUCN Red List data deficient species (Nemertina) =

On 29 January 2010, the IUCN Red List of Threatened Species identified three data deficient species in the Nemertina phylum (Animalia kingdom).

== Enopla ==
=== Hoplonemertea ===
==== Prosorhochmidae ====
- Argonemertes stocki
- Geonemertes rodericana
- Pantinonemertes agricola
