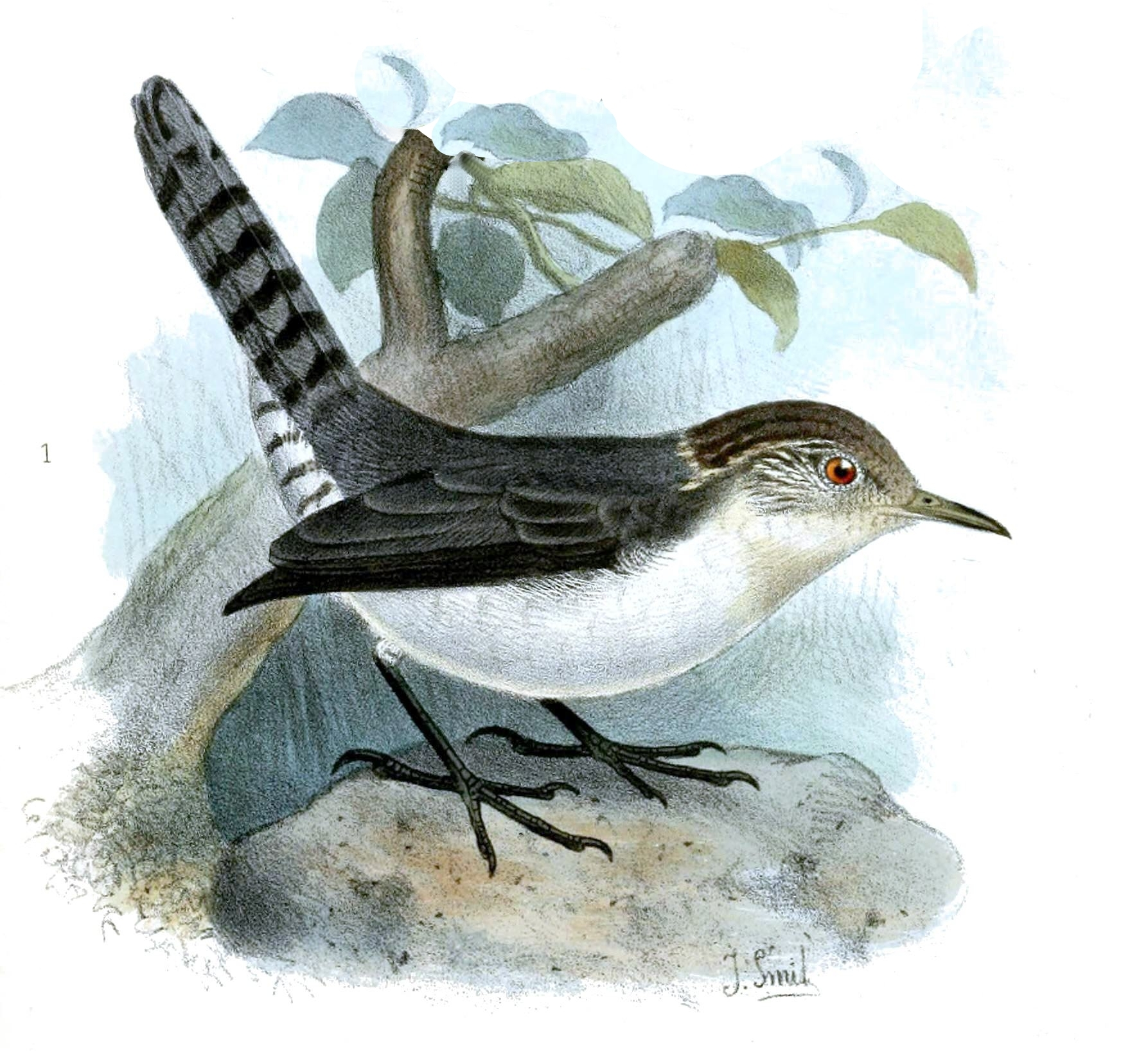

Conservation status
- Least Concern (IUCN 3.1)

Scientific classification
- Kingdom: Animalia
- Phylum: Chordata
- Class: Aves
- Order: Passeriformes
- Family: Troglodytidae
- Genus: Odontorchilus
- Species: O. branickii

Binomial name
- Odontorchilus branickii (Taczanowski & Berlepsch, 1885)

= Grey-mantled wren =

Species of bird

The grey-mantled wren (Odontorchilus branickii) is a species of bird in the family Troglodytidae. It is found in Bolivia, Colombia, Ecuador, and Peru.

== Taxonomy and systematics ==
The grey-mantled wren shares its genus with one other species, the tooth-billed wren (Odontorchilus cinereous). Some authors have suggested that they are conspecific or that they form a superspecies. The grey-mantled wren has two subspecies, the nominate Odontorchilus branickii branickii and O. b. minor.

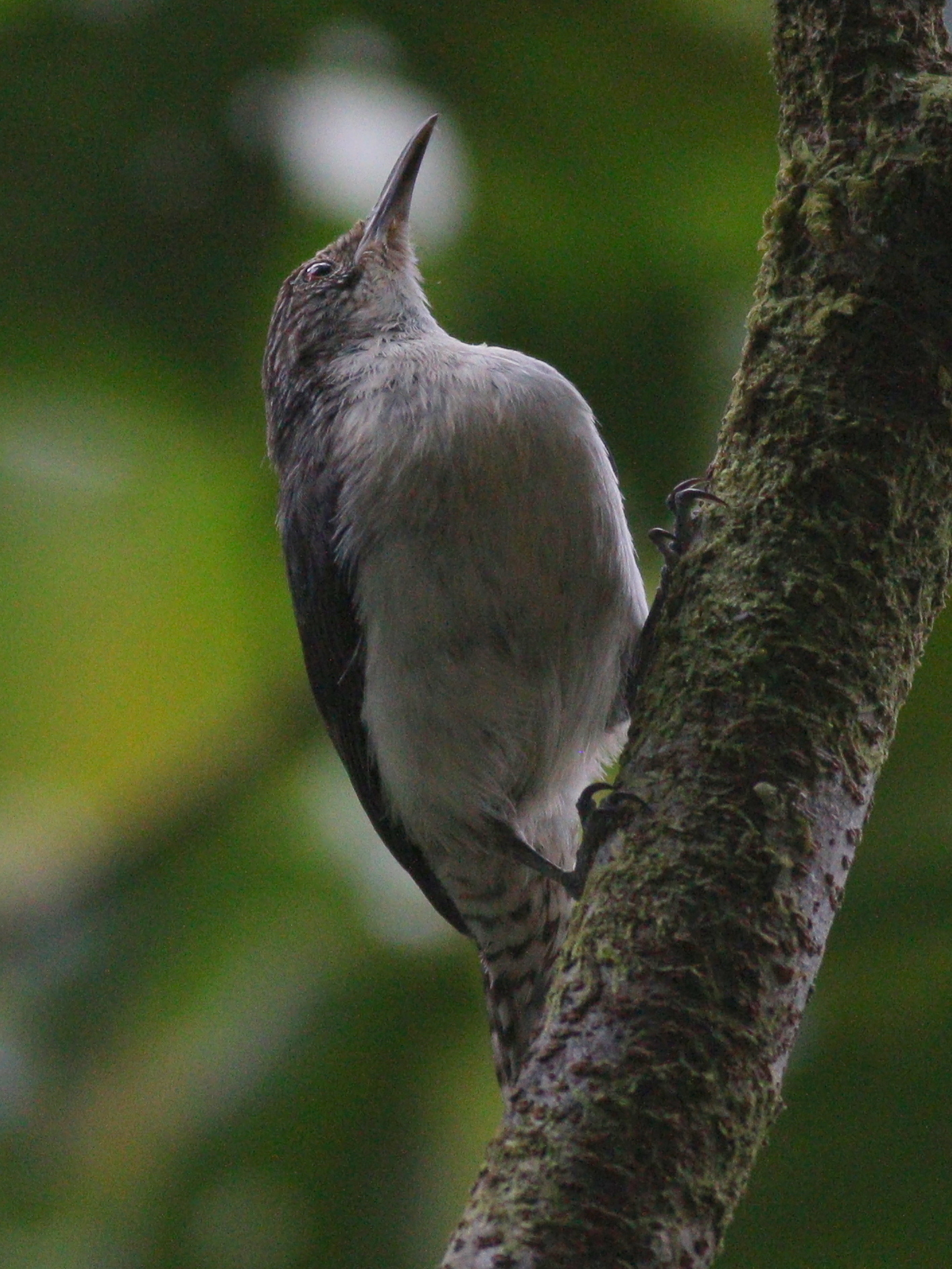
Grey-mantled wren

== Description ==
The grey-mantled wren is 12 to 13 cm (4.7 to 5.1 in) long; a male O. b. minor weighed 9.0 g (0.32 oz) and a female O. b. branickii 10.2 g (0.36 oz). The nominate adult has a tawny forecrown and a darker brown crown the merges into the gray of its back, which is browner on the rump. The tail is medium gray with prominent black bars and a white bar near the end. It has a faint grayish brown supercilium and the face and sides of the neck are also grayish brown. The throat, breast, and belly are white slightly tinged with buff, and the flanks are grayish. The adult O. b. minor is similar but the barring on the tail is reduced on the central feathers. The juvenile has more of a buff wash on the breast than the adult but is otherwise similar.

== Distribution and habitat ==
The nominate grey-mantled wren has a discontinuous range in the southern part of Colombia's Eastern Andes and on the eastern slope of the main Andes through Ecuador and Peru to Bolivia's La Paz Department. In elevation it ranges from 1,200 to 2,300 m (3,900 to 7,500 ft) in Colombia, 1,100 to 1,900 m (3,600 to 6,200 ft) in Ecuador, 750 to 1,800 m (2,460 to 5,910 ft) in Peru, and 1,200 to 1,700 m (3,900 to 5,600 ft) in Bolivia. O. b. minor is found on the west slope of Colombia's Western Andes and far northern Ecuador, mostly between 200 and 500 m (660 and 1,640 ft) but locally as low as 100 m (330 ft). It inhabits the canopy and sub-canopy of humid montane forest.

== Behavior ==
=== Feeding ===
No details are known about the grey-mantled wren's diet beyond that the species is insectivorous. It forages 15 to 30 m (49 to 98 ft) up in the canopy by constantly moving along branches while probing moss and lichens for prey. It usually is part of a mixed-species foraging flock.

=== Breeding ===
The grey-mantled wren's nest and eggs have not been documented. Its relative the tooth-billed wren is thought to nest in tree cavities, so grey-mantled might do so.

=== Vocalization ===
The grey-mantled wren's typical song is "a short dry trill". It also sings "a series of whistled notes".

== Status ==
The IUCN has assessed the grey-mantled wren as being of Least Concern. However, it "usually is considered to be uncommon or even rare" and "its population is suspected to be in decline".
