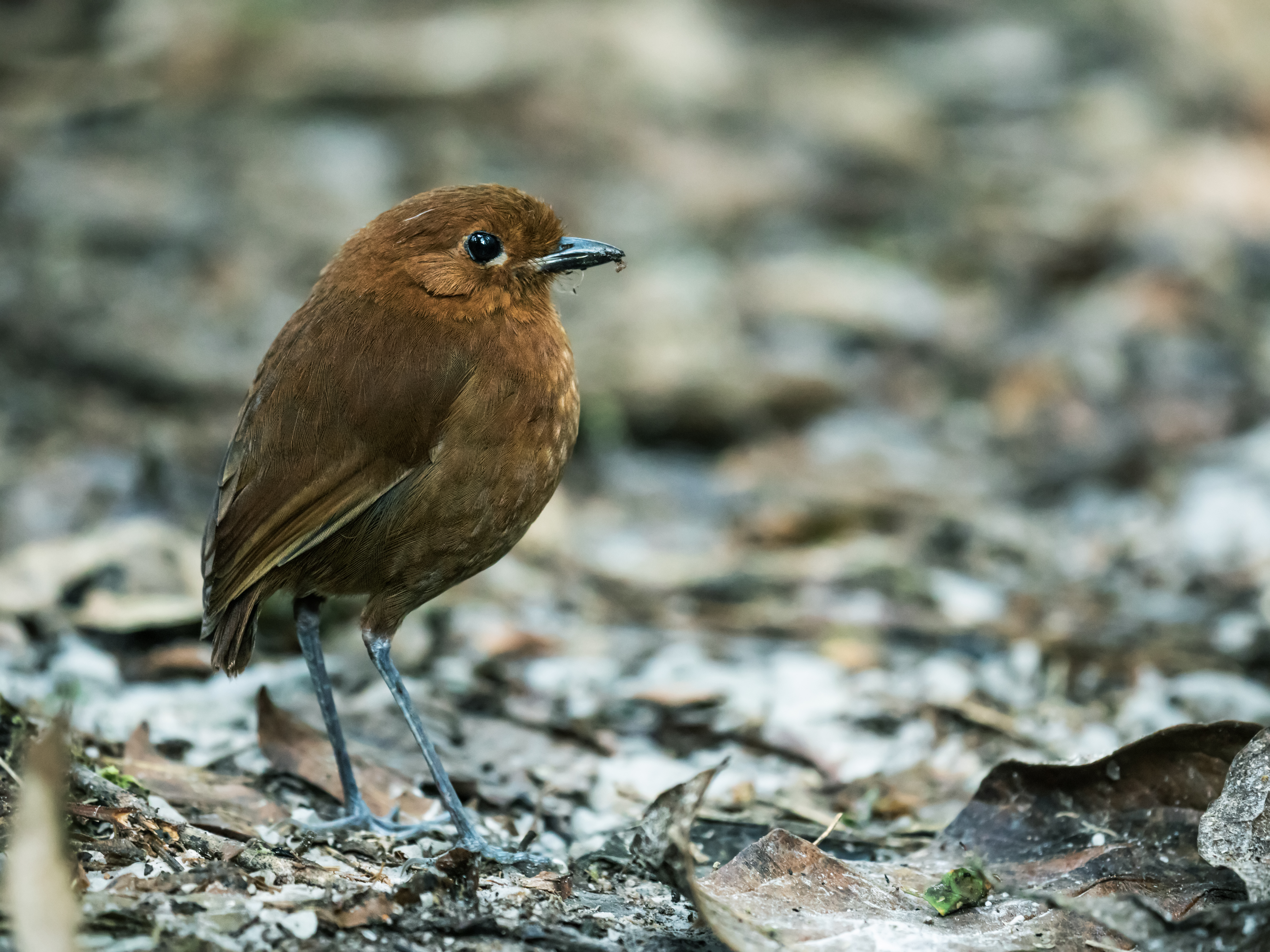

Conservation status
- Least Concern (IUCN 3.1)

Scientific classification
- Kingdom: Animalia
- Phylum: Chordata
- Class: Aves
- Order: Passeriformes
- Family: Grallariidae
- Genus: Grallaria
- Species: G. blakei

Binomial name
- Grallaria blakei Graves, 1987
- Range of the chestnut antpitta (north) and the Oxapampa and Ayacucho antpittas (south). See the Taxonomy and Distribution sections.

= Chestnut antpitta =

Species of bird

The chestnut antpitta (Grallaria blakei) is a species of bird in the family Grallariidae. It is endemic to Peru.

== Taxonomy and systematics ==
The chestnut antpitta has always been regarded as monotypic. A study published in 2020 showed that two populations of it were actually separate species, the Oxapampa antpitta (G. centralis) and Ayacucho antpitta (G. ayacuchensis). By mid-2022 the International Ornithological Committee, the Clements taxonomy, and the South American Classification Committee of the American Ornithological Society had recognized the two new species, significantly reducing the range attributed to the chestnut antpitta. However, as of early 2024 BirdLife International's Handbook of the Birds of the World (HBW) had not recognized them.

== Description ==
The chestnut antpitta is about 14.5 to 15 cm (5.7 to 5.9 in) long; six individuals weighed between 37 and 47 g (1.3 and 1.7 oz). The sexes have the same plumage. Adults have rufous brown upperparts. Their lores and most of their face are rufous. Their throat and breast are pale rufous, their belly whitish buff with obscure dusky barring, their flanks brown or olive brown, and their vent and undertail coverts tawny brown. They have a brown iris, a black bill, and slate, blue-gray, or silvery gray legs and feet.

== Distribution and habitat ==
The chestnut antpitta is found intermittently on the eastern slope of the Peruvian Andes from the Cordillera de Colán in Amazonas Department south for an unknown distance but short of northern Huánuco Department. It inhabits humid montane forest and secondary forest where it favors stands of bamboo and other dense undergrowth.

== Behavior ==
=== Movement ===
The chestnut antpitta is believed to be a year-round resident throughout its range.

=== Feeding ===
The chestnut antpitta's diet and foraging behavior have not been detailed; it is assumed to eat arthropods and perhaps small vertebrates as do other members of genus Grallaria . It is known to forage on or very near the ground.

=== Breeding ===
Nothing is known about the chestnut antpitta's breeding biology.

=== Vocalization ===
The chestnut antpitta's song is "a rapid, monotone, slightly accelerating series of chiming notes: chew'chu'uuuuuuuu'uuu".

== Status ==
The IUCN follows HBW taxonomy and so its assessment of the chestnut antpitta includes the Oxapampa and Ayacucho antpittas. That species sensu lato is assessed as being of Least Concern. It is considered "locally fairly common".
