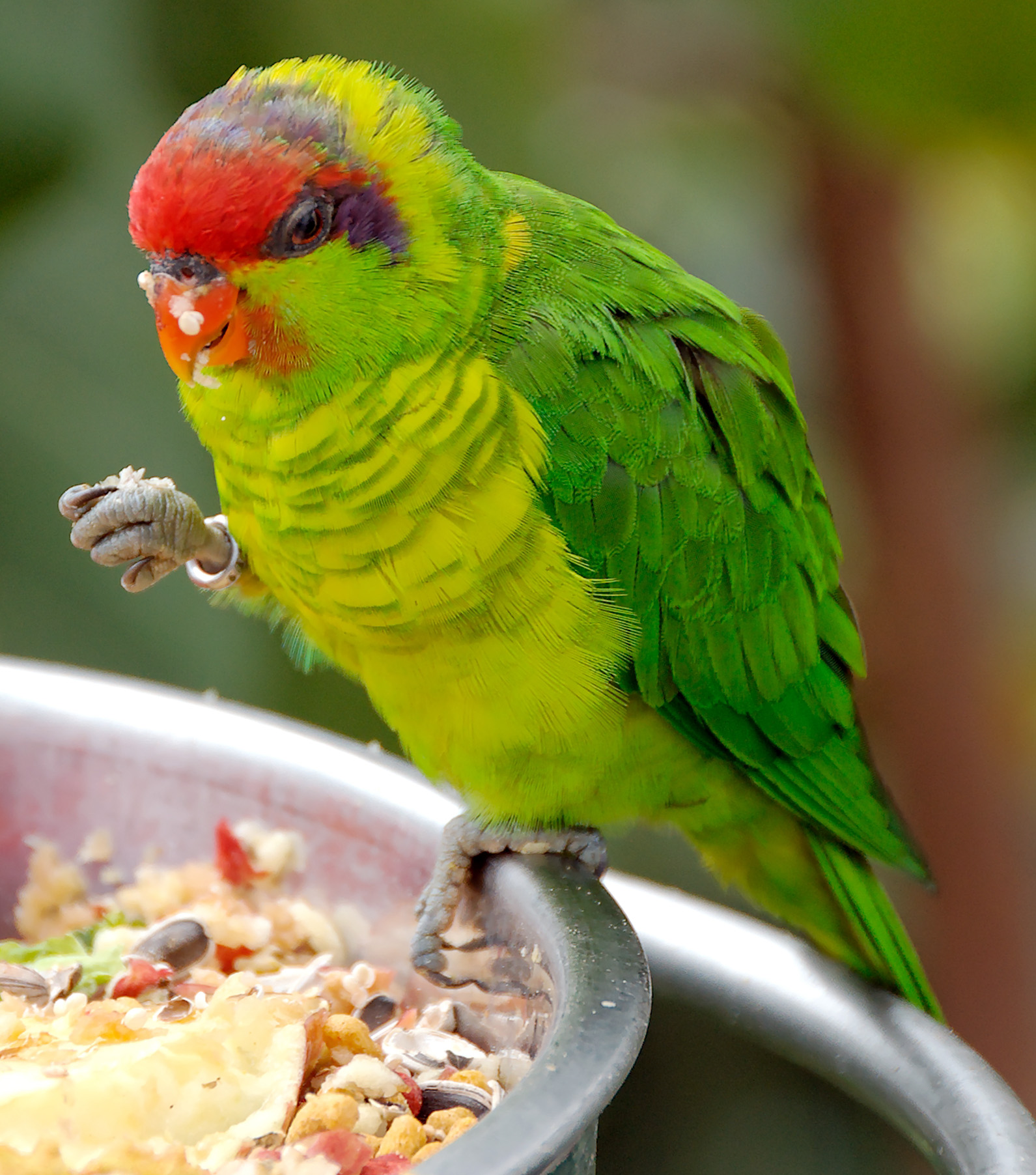
- At San Diego Zoo

Conservation status
- Near Threatened (IUCN 3.1)

Scientific classification
- Kingdom: Animalia
- Phylum: Chordata
- Class: Aves
- Order: Psittaciformes
- Family: Psittaculidae
- Genus: Trichoglossus
- Species: T. iris

Binomial name
- Trichoglossus iris (Temminck, 1835)

Synonyms
- Psitteuteles iris Saudareos iris

= Iris lorikeet =

Species of bird

The iris lorikeet (Trichoglossus iris) is a small, up to 20 cm (8 in) long, green lorikeet bird. The male has a red forehead, yellow nape, purple band back from eye between nape and cheek, and yellowish below. The female almost similar with red-marked green forecrown and yellowish green cheek.

The iris lorikeet is distributed in the forests and woodlands on the islands of Wetar and Timor in the Lesser Sundas. It is found from sea level to altitude of 1,500 m (5,000 ft). The iris lorikeet is usually found in small flocks.

Due to ongoing habitat loss, limited range and illegal trapping for the caged-bird trade, the iris lorikeet is evaluated as Near Threatened on IUCN Red List of Threatened Species. It is listed on Appendix II of CITES.

== Taxonomy ==
Two subspecies are recognised:

- T. i. wetterensis (Hellmayr, CE, 1912) – Wetar (eastern Lesser Sunda Islands)
- T. i. iris (Temminck, CJ, 1835) – Timor (eastern Lesser Sunda Islands)

== Description ==
The iris lorikeet is 20 cm (8 in) long. It is mostly green with pale-green transverse striations on its underside. The head is red above the eye and there is a purple band from the eyes extending over the ears. The beak is red-orange, the iris is orange, and the legs are bluish-grey. The male and female are almost identical, but the red on the head of the female is paler and less extensive. Juveniles resemble females, but have a brownish bill, brown irises, duller purple bands and less red on the head. The extent and shade of the red and purple on the head varies between two or three subspecies. Compared to the nominate subspecies, T. i. wetterensis has a larger area of darker green on side of head.
