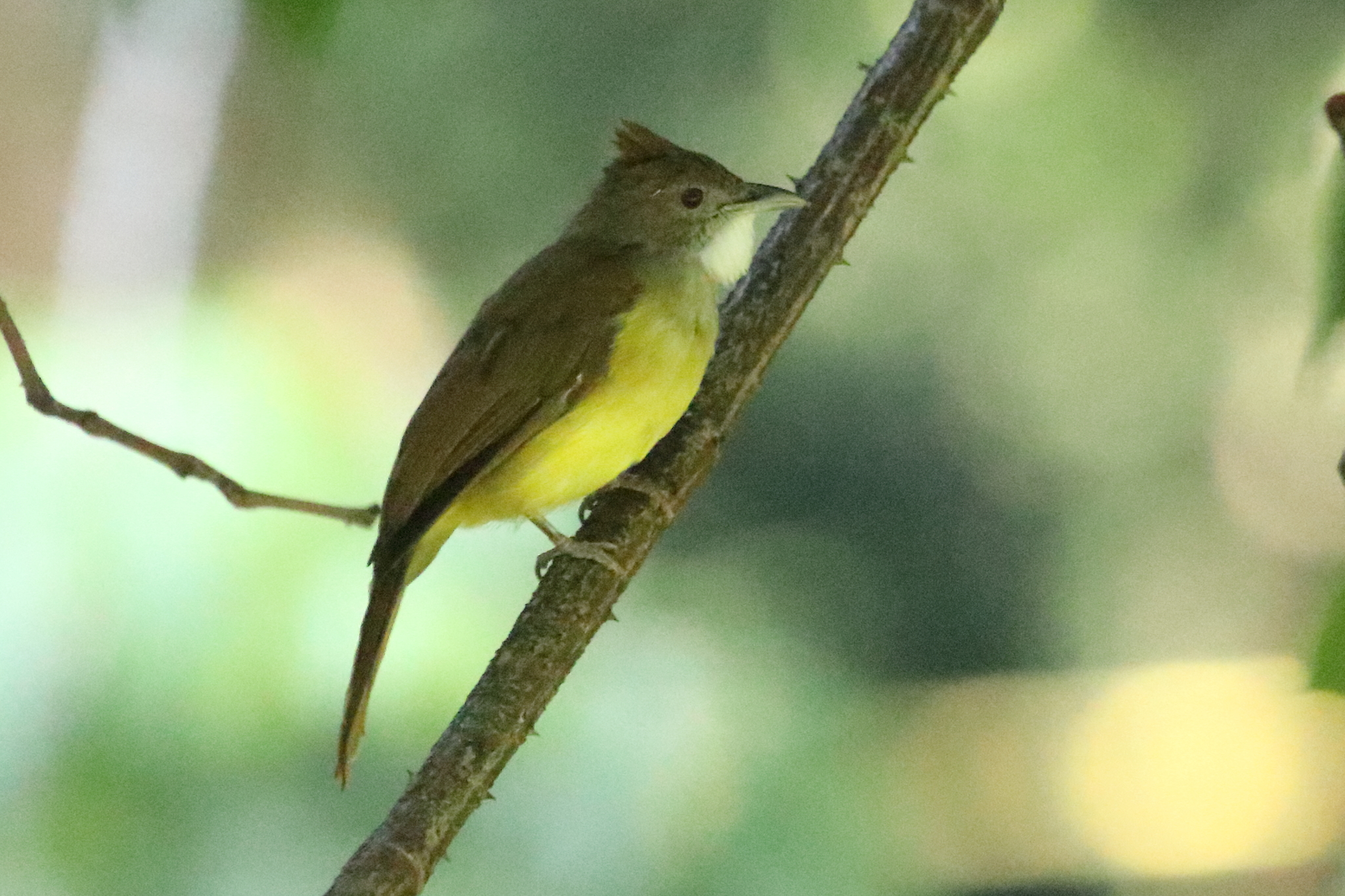

Conservation status
- Endangered (IUCN 3.1)

Scientific classification
- Kingdom: Animalia
- Phylum: Chordata
- Class: Aves
- Order: Passeriformes
- Family: Pycnonotidae
- Genus: Alophoixus
- Species: A. bres

Binomial name
- Alophoixus bres (Lesson, 1831)

Synonyms
- Criniger bres; Lanius Bres

= Brown-cheeked bulbul =

Species of songbird

The brown-cheeked bulbul (Alophoixus bres) is a species of songbird in the bulbul family, Pycnonotidae. It is found on Java and Bali. Its natural habitats are subtropical or tropical moist lowland forests and subtropical or tropical moist montane forests.

== Taxonomy and systematics ==
The brown-cheeked bulbul was originally described in the genus Lanius and later classified in Criniger until moved to the genus Alophoixus in 2009. Alternate names for the brown-cheeked bulbul include the grey-cheeked bulbul, olive white-headed bulbul and scrub bulbul.

== Description ==
The brown-cheeked bulbul is a robustly-built bulbul, growing to an average length of 19–23 cm (7.5–9.1 in) and weighing 29–52 g (1.0–1.8 oz). Females are somewhat smaller than males, but otherwise share their appearance. Adults have olive-brown upperparts and largely yellow underparts. The breast is ashy brown, while the flanks are yellow-brown, changing to a creamy yellow towards the belly. The chin and throat are white, while the face is grey, with a relatively short reddish-brown crest.

== Diet ==
It eats insects: caterpillars, butterflies, moths, beetle larvae, cicadas, crickets, grasshoppers, and tephritid fruit flies. It also eats fruit: mangir, lempeni, and senggani.

== Breeding ==
They make cup-shaped nests out of plant fragments, and camouflage them with moss and lichen. They nest in majegau, melinjo, cacao, and mahogany trees.
