= Mountain starling =

Conservation status
- Endangered (IUCN 3.1)

Scientific classification
- Kingdom: Animalia
- Phylum: Chordata
- Class: Aves
- Order: Passeriformes
- Family: Sturnidae
- Genus: Aplonis
- Species: A. santovestris

Binomial name
- Aplonis santovestris Harrisson & Marshall, AJ, 1937

Species of bird

The mountain starling (Aplonis santovestris), also known as Vanuatu starling, Santo mountain starling or Santo starling, is a bird species in the family Sturnidae. It is endemic to the island of Espiritu Santo in Vanuatu. It is restricted to the cloud forest on that island. The species was rarely seen in the 20th century and was at one point feared to be extinct, although a 1991 expedition managed to find a population high in the mountains.
