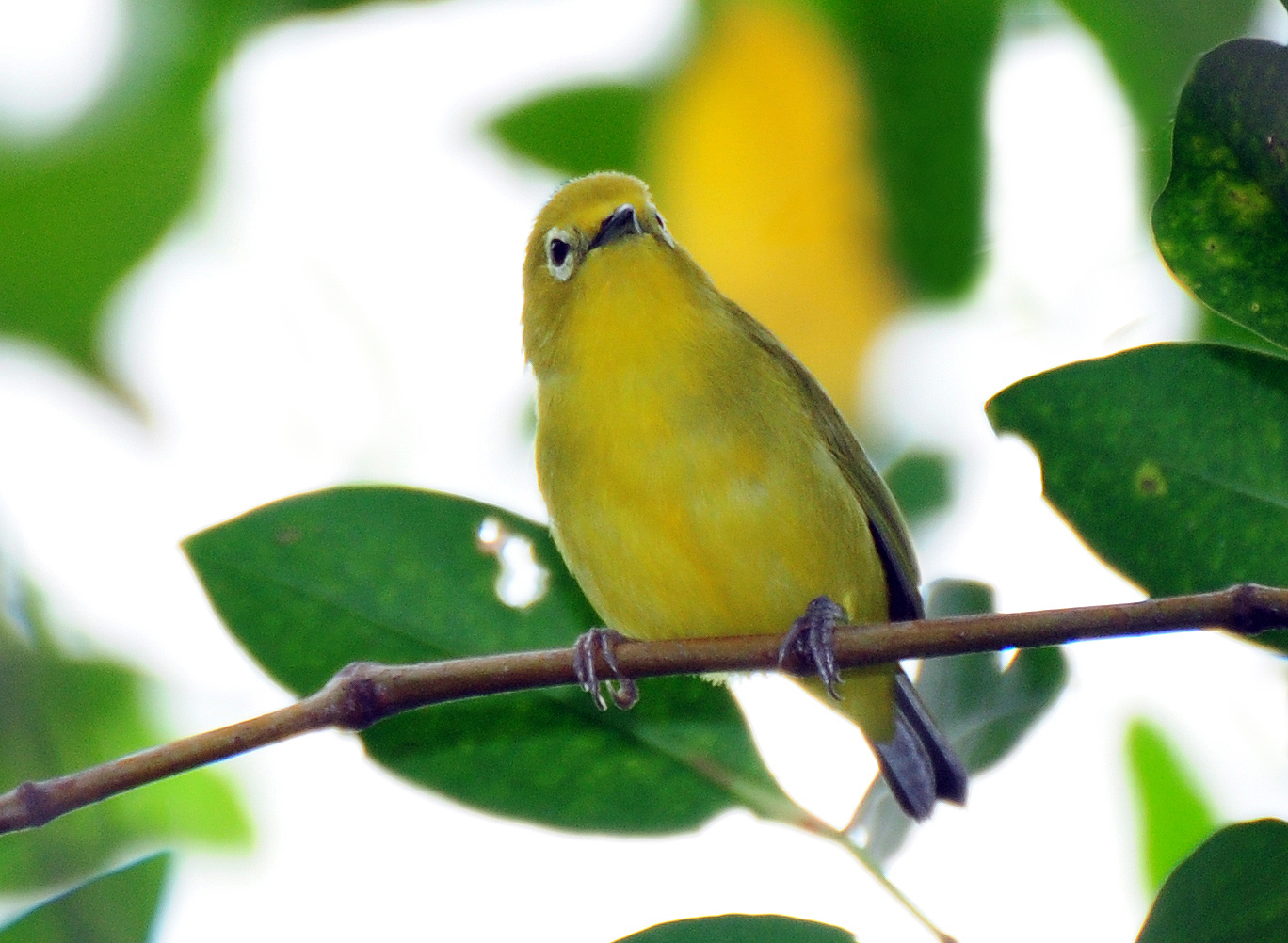
- in a mangrove forest near Surabaya, East Java

Conservation status
- Endangered (IUCN 3.1)

Scientific classification
- Kingdom: Animalia
- Phylum: Chordata
- Class: Aves
- Order: Passeriformes
- Family: Zosteropidae
- Genus: Zosterops
- Species: Z. flavus

Binomial name
- Zosterops flavus (Horsfield, 1821)

= Javan white-eye =

Species of bird

The Javan white-eye (Zosterops flavus) is a bird species in the family Zosteropidae that occurs in Java and Borneo. It is threatened by trapping for wildlife trade and has been assessed as Endangered on the IUCN Red List in 2019, as the wild population declined significantly.

In West Java, it has been recorded in Pulau Dua, Muara Gembong and Tanjung Sedari between 1984 and 1985. Its natural habitat includes tropical moist lowland and mangrove forests and shrubland.

In August 2015, it was sighted in four urban parks of Malang in East Java. Between July 2015 and August 2016, it was also recorded as one of 15 songbird species traded in high volume and with high prices during surveys in wildlife markets in Kalimantan. Shop owners admitted that demand for and value of Javan white-eye has increased.

== Description ==
The Javan white-eye is 10 cm (3.9 in) large on average. It has yellow plumage underneath.
