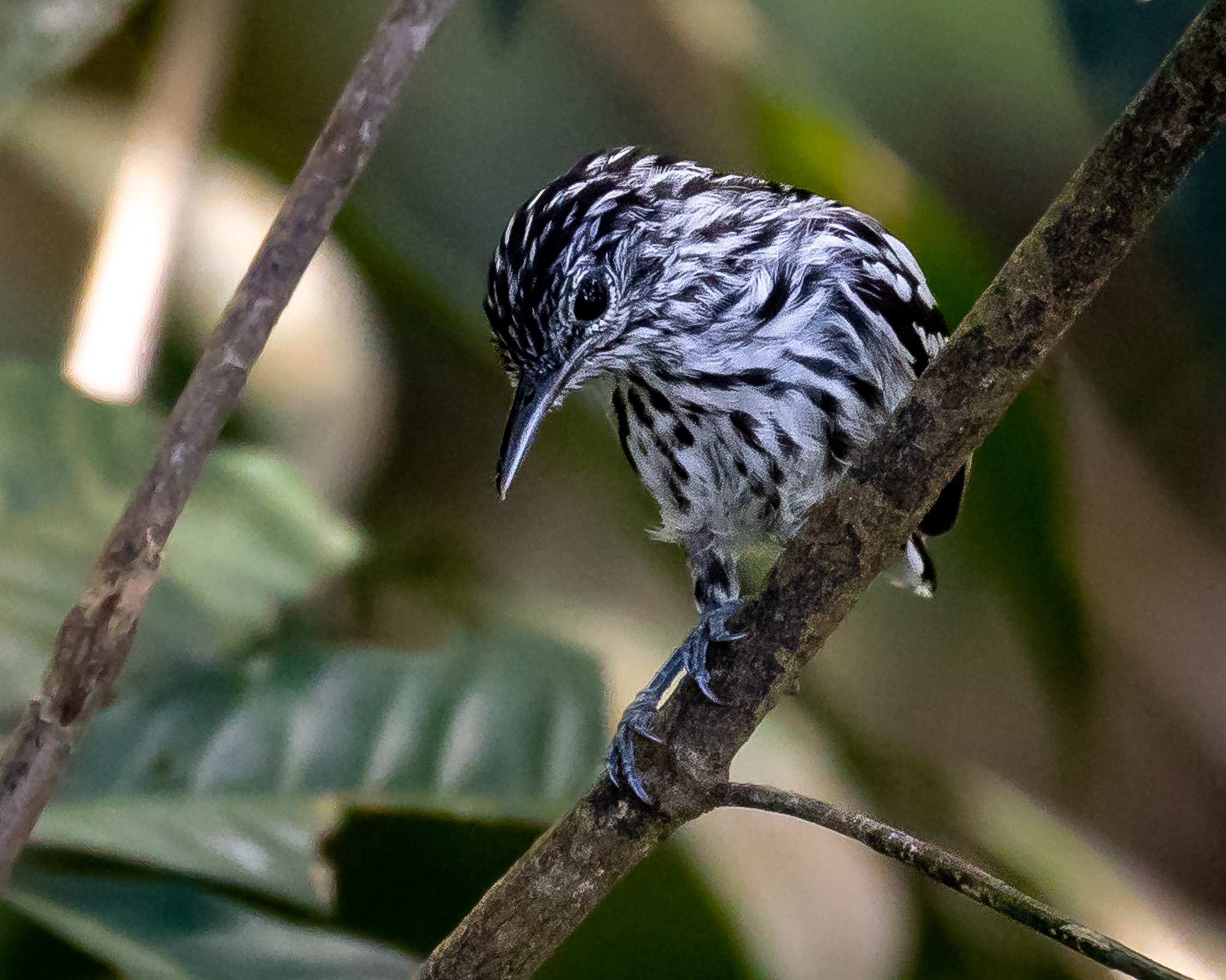
- Male at Anavilhanas National Park, Novo Airão, Amazonas state, Brazil.
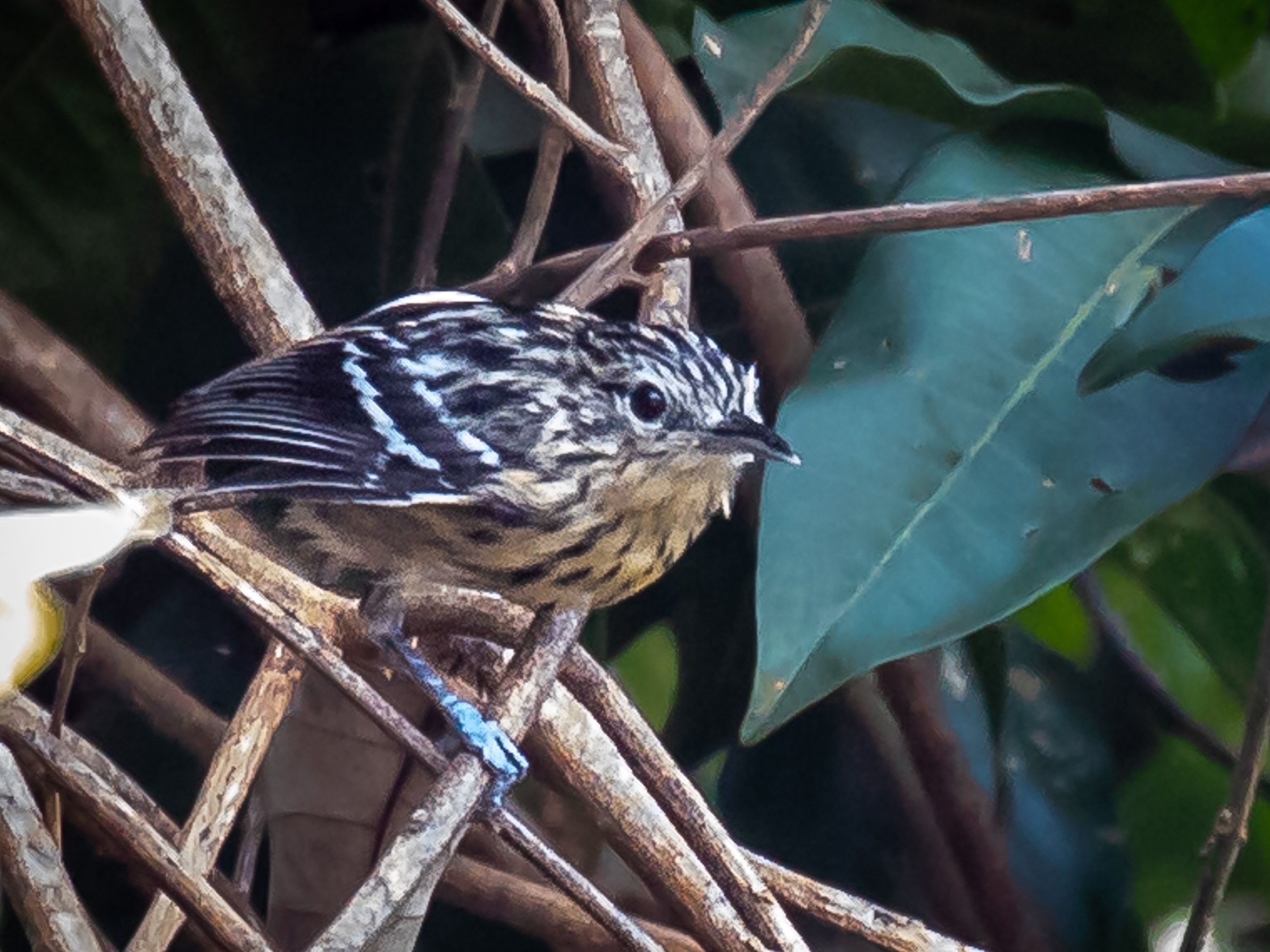
- Female at Anavilhanas National Park

Conservation status
- Vulnerable (IUCN 3.1)

Scientific classification
- Kingdom: Animalia
- Phylum: Chordata
- Class: Aves
- Order: Passeriformes
- Family: Thamnophilidae
- Genus: Myrmotherula
- Species: M. klagesi

Binomial name
- Myrmotherula klagesi Todd, 1927

= Klages's antwren =

Species of bird in Brazil

Klages's antwren (Myrmotherula klagesi) is a species of bird in subfamily Thamnophilinae of family Thamnophilidae, the "typical antbirds". It is endemic to Brazil.

== Taxonomy and systematics ==
Klages's antwren is monotypic.

The species' English name and specific epithet commemorate Samuel M. Klages, who collected the first specimen in Santarém, Pará, Brazil.

== Description ==
Klages's antwren is 9 to 10 cm (3.5 to 3.9 in) long and weighs 7.5 to 8.5 g (0.26 to 0.30 oz). It is a smallish bird with a tiny tail. Adult males have a black and white streaked face. Their crown, back, and rump are black with white streaks. Their tail is black with white edges and tips to the feathers. Their wings are black with white tips on the coverts and white edges on the flight feathers. Their throat, breast, and belly are white and their flanks and crissum grayer. Black streaks extend from the throat to the flanks and belly. Adult females have buff streaks (not white) on the head and upperparts. Their underparts are buff with black streaks that are mostly on the breast and sides.

== Distribution and habitat ==
Klages's antwren is native to northern Amazonia, where it occurs solely along the rio Branco, the confluences of the rio Negro and Madeira and along the Amazon River east to the mouth of the rio Tapajós. It inhabits the subcanopy and canopy of lowland várzea and igapó evergreen forest, almost entirely below an elevation of 100 m (300 ft). It stays near the rivers including on islands.

== Behavior ==
=== Movement ===
Klages's antwren is believed to be a year-round resident throughout its range.

=== Feeding ===
Klages's antwren feeds on arthropods, especially insects and spiders. It typically forages singly or in pairs and regularly joins mixed-species feeding flocks. It mostly feeds in dense foliage as high as (or beyond) 20 m (65 ft) above the ground, though it will descend to within about 3 m (10 ft) of the ground at the edges of watercourses and clearings. It actively seeks prey among leaves and vine tangles and along branches, gleaning by reaching, lunging, and with brief sallies from a perch.

=== Breeding ===
Nothing is known about the breeding biology of Klages's antwren.

=== Vocalization ===
The song of Klages's antwren is a "short series of double notes 'teWic --'...(5-7 x)". Its call is a "high, dry 'tzik-tzik tzik -' ".

== Status ==
The IUCN originally in 1988 assessed Klages's antwren as Near Threatened and uplisted it to Vulnerable in 2017. It has a small range and restricted habitat requirements. Its population size is not known and is believed to be decreasing. "The species is predicted to lose 30-59% of its habitat by 2020 due to agriculture, deforestation and hydroelectric dam construction". It is considered fairly common to common in the Anavilhanas Archipelago on the Rio Negro; that area and several others where it occurs are protected as national and state parks. These areas "currently protect a large, viable population of the species. The small range of this thamnophilid is, however, a cause for concern".
