= Data deficient =

IUCN species-conservation category

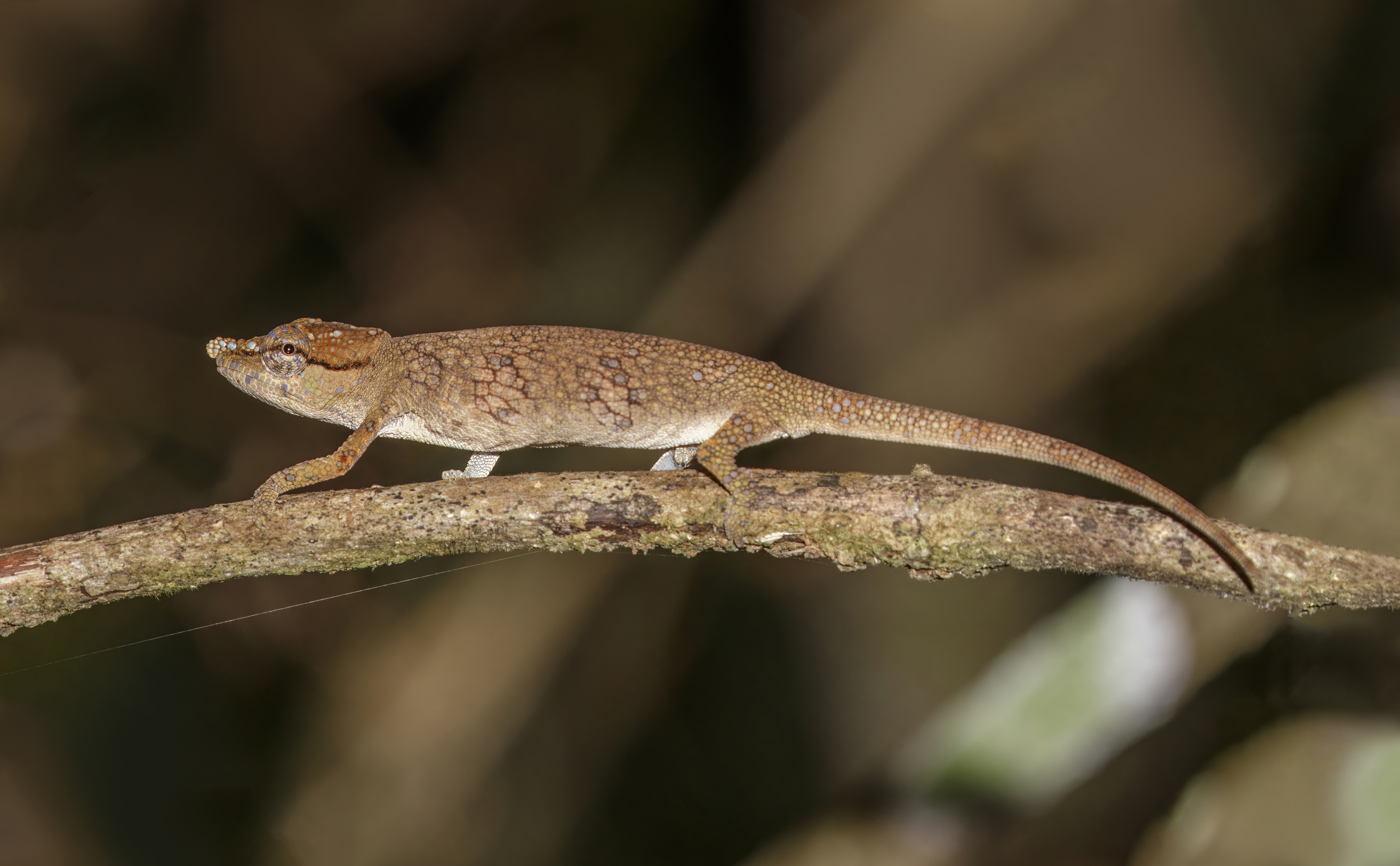
The short-nosed deceptive chameleon of eastern Madagascar is a species classed as data deficient; its population is unknown.

A data deficient (DD) species is one which has been categorized by the International Union for Conservation of Nature (IUCN) as offering insufficient information for a proper assessment of conservation.

== Qualifications ==
DD species may have been extensively studied, but in some cases little or no information is available on the abundance and distribution of the species. It can also indicate uncertainty about the taxonomic classification of an organism; for example, the IUCN classifies the orca as "data deficient" because of the likelihood that two or more types of the whale are separate species.

The orca is an example of a data deficient species.

The IUCN recommends that care be taken to avoid classing species as "data deficient" when the absence of records may indicate dangerously low abundance: "If the range of a taxon is suspected to be relatively circumscribed, if a considerable period of time has elapsed since the last record of the taxon, threatened status may well be justified" (see also precautionary principle).

== See also ==
- IUCN Red List data deficient species
- List of data deficient amphibians
- List of data deficient arthropods
- List of data deficient birds
- List of data deficient fishes
- List of data deficient insects
- List of data deficient invertebrates
- List of data deficient mammals
- List of data deficient molluscs
- List of data deficient plants
- List of data deficient reptiles
