= List of birds extinct in the wild =

As of 2020, there are five species of birds that are considered extinct in the wild by the International Union for Conservation of Nature.

== List of species ==
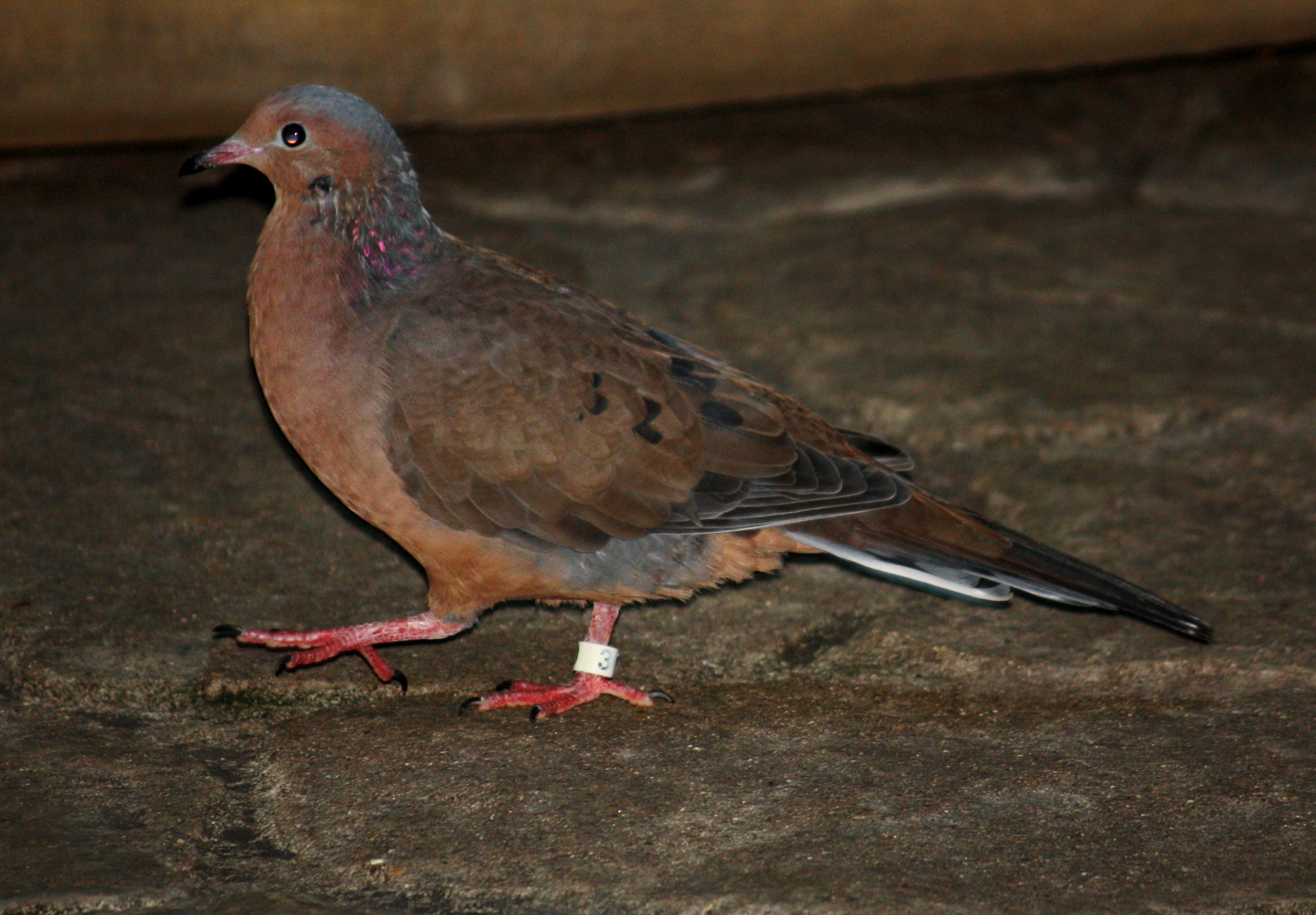
A captive Socorro dove at the Louisville Zoo

- Socorro dove – previously endemic to Socorro Island
- Hawaiian crow – previously endemic to the Big island of Hawaii
- Alagoas curassow – previously endemic to the state of Alagoas, Brazil
- Spix's macaw – previously endemic to Bahia, Brazil
- Guam kingfisher – previously endemic to Guam
