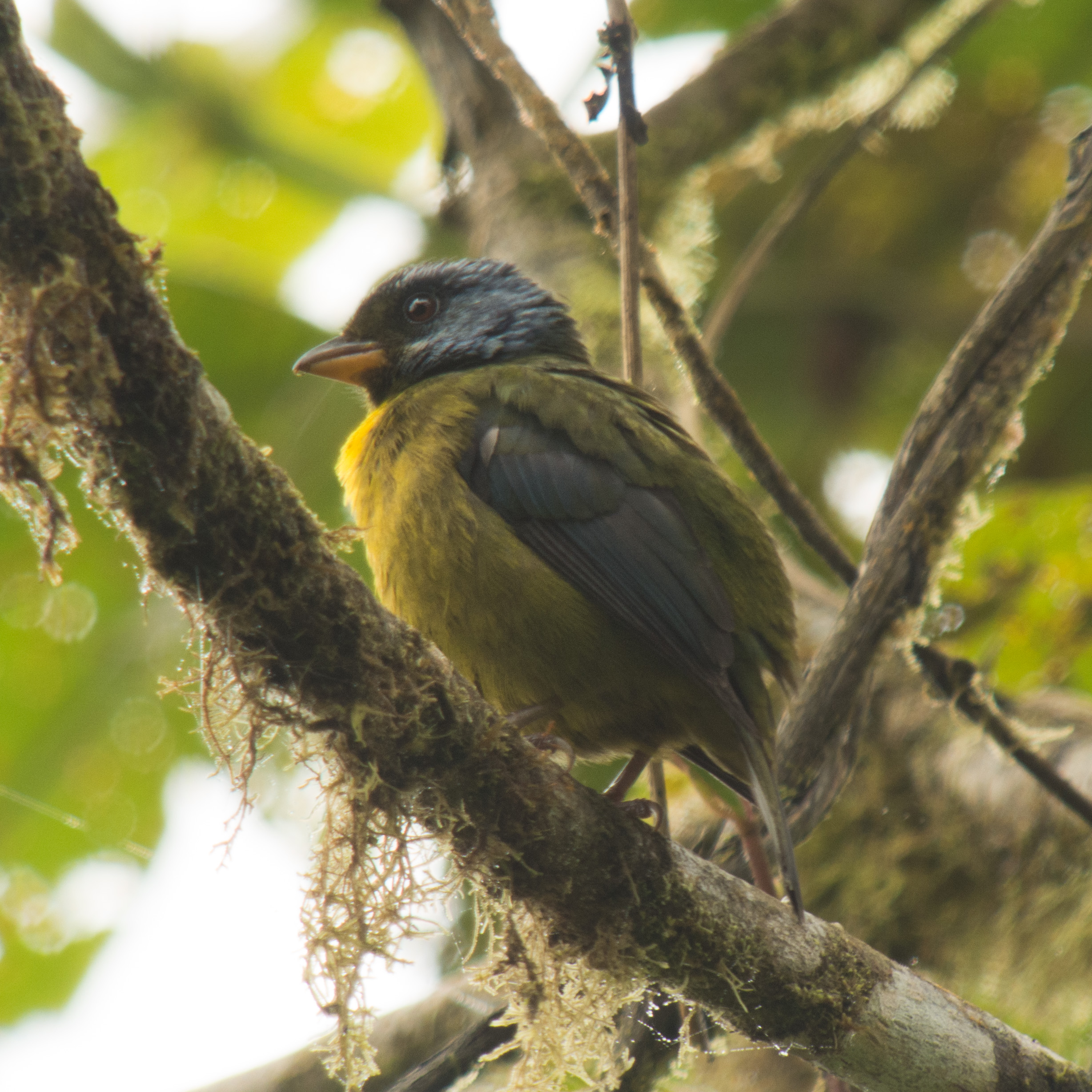

Conservation status
- Least Concern (IUCN 3.1)

Scientific classification
- Kingdom: Animalia
- Phylum: Chordata
- Class: Aves
- Order: Passeriformes
- Family: Thraupidae
- Genus: Bangsia
- Species: B. edwardsi

Binomial name
- Bangsia edwardsi (Elliot, 1865)

= Moss-backed tanager =

Species of bird

The moss-backed tanager (Bangsia edwardsi) is a species of bird in the family Thraupidae. It is found in Colombia and Ecuador. It is a chunky, large-headed tanager with moss-green upperparts, dark blue-tinged dark green wings, olive green underparts, a bright golden yellow patch on the chest, and black head with shining blue sides. It is endemic to the Western Andes of western Colombia and northwestern Ecuador, where it inhabits dense, humid Pacific slope forests. It feeds on insects and fruit. It is classified as being of least concern on the IUCN Red List due to its sufficiently large range and population.

== Taxonomy ==
The moss-backed tanager was formally described as Buthraupis edwardsi by the American zoologist Daniel Giraud Elliot in 1865 based on a specimen from Colombia. It is named after Henri Milne-Edwards, a French zoologist. The American zoologist Thomas E. Penard moved the moss-backed tanager into the newly-erected genus Bangsia in 1919, alongside the other smaller, shorter-tailed Buthraupis species. The classification of Bangsia remained a controversial topic until the 2000s, when genetic analyses showed that Buthraupis and Bangsia are not sister genera. Within the genus Bangsia, the moss-backed tanager is most closely related to the gold-ringed tanager.

== Description ==
The species is a chunky, large-headed tanager with a distinctive appearance. The upperparts and back mostly moss-green, with dark blue-tinged dark green wings. The underparts are mainly olive green with a yellowish hue, with a bright golden yellow patch in the middle of the chest. There is occasionally an indistinct yellow median line between the chest and belly. The head is black from the throat up to the central nape, with shining blue sides. The beak is stubby and bicolored, with a dusky upper mandible and yellow lower mandible. The eyes are brown and the legs are gray. Both sexes are similar-looking in the visible spectrum, but males reflect UV light more strongly than females. Immatures are duller than adults.

It is most similar-looking to the related gold-ringed tanager, but lacks that species' golden-yellow face markings. It also resembles the golden-chested tanager in having a bright yellow chest patch, but the golden-chested tanager is otherwise mostly blackish in color.

== Distribution and habitat ==
The moss-backed tanager is endemic to the Western Andes of western Colombia and northwestern Ecuador, where it inhabits dense, humid Pacific slope forests. They are usually found in premontane forests between tropical lowland forests and montane evergreen forests, but have also been recorded from woodland edge, secondary growth, and clearings. They have a somewhat discontinuous distribution, being lacking in parts of Cauca that have otherwise suitable habitat, and are typically found at elevations of 600-2200 m. In Ecuador, they are usually recorded between 500 m and 1100 m, although some records are as high as 1700 m. Its distribution is separated elevationally from the closely-related golden-chested tanager, which occupies foothill forests at lower elevations. The lack of golden-chested tanagers in the southern portions of the moss-backed tanager's range may explain its presence at lower elevations in Ecuador.

== Biology ==
Moss-backed tanagers can be seen in alone, pairs, small flocks, or larger mixed-species foraging flocks. They have been observed feeding near army ant swarms alongside uniform antshrikes. It is known to sit on a single perch for extended durations without moving, preferring open perches, sometimes overlooking the forest. As rather chunky bird, they hop slowly while traversing mossy branches, occasionally making 180° pivots, and have a heavy, buzzy when flying directly between trees.

Foraging is usually conducted in the middle or upper canopy, but sometimes occurs at lower strata. Individuals or pairs usually search for prey in thick vegetation or epiphytes, gleaning arthropods, flutter-pursuing any insects that flush, and sallying for flying invertebrates. They also feed on fruit while perching.

In Ecuador, nesting has been recorded from wet foothill forests in the month of July. Begging juveniles have been seen in June and recently fledged young in January. The only described nest was an open cup-nest located on small mossy branches, at a height of around 2m near a tree trunk. The nest was mostly composed of moss and fern fronds, with a slender vine used as the inner lining, and measured 65mm across and 30mm deep. The eggs are oval-shaped and matte white, with fine brownish-red spots at the narrower end that become denser towards to large end, eventually forming a dense ring. They measured 26.5 mm long and 18.2 mm wide.

They are known to be parasitized by Myrsidea lice.

== Conservation ==
The moss-backed tanager is classified as being of least concern on the IUCN Red List due to its sufficiently large range and population. Despite being fairly common within its range, it is highly dependent on forests and consequently has been impacted by the historical loss of over a fifth of forested habitats within its range. Its population is currently thought to be decreasing, mainly due to habitat loss caused by continuing deforestation, gold mining, and fumigation to combat narcotics cultivation. It is known from several protected areas in Colombia and Ecuador.
