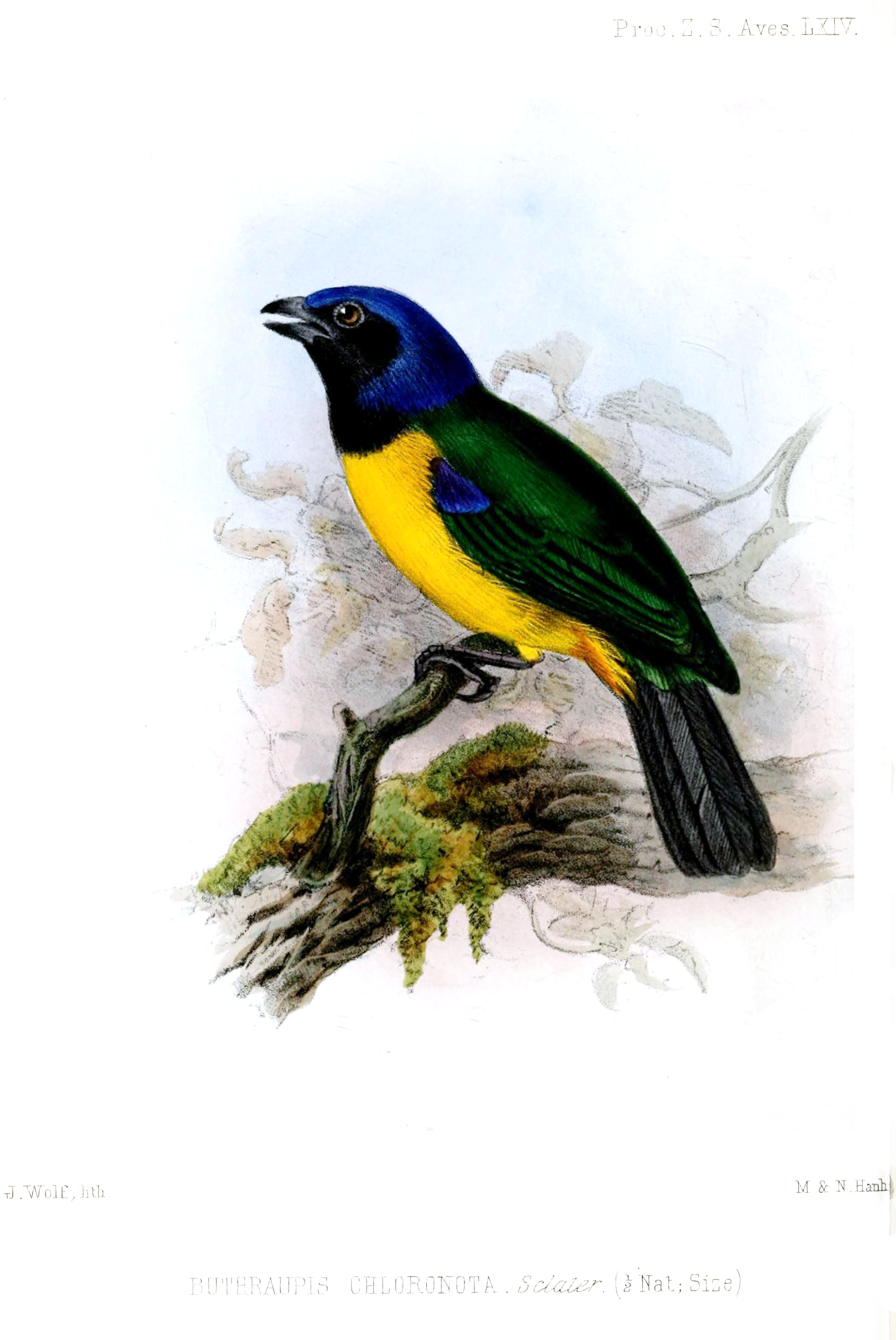
- Black-chested mountain tanager, (Cnemathraupis eximia)

Scientific classification
- Kingdom: Animalia
- Phylum: Chordata
- Class: Aves
- Order: Passeriformes
- Family: Thraupidae
- Genus: Cnemathraupis; Penard, 1919

Type species
- Tanagra eximia Boissonneau, 1840

= Cnemathraupis =

Genus of birds

Cnemathraupis is a small genus of mountain tanagers found in forest and woodland in the Andes of South America. The two species are uncommon and relatively large tanagers with a contrasting blue, yellow and black plumage (golden-backed mountain tanager also has some brown; black-chested mountain tanager some green).

== Taxonomy and species list ==
These species were formerly included with the hooded mountain tanager in the genus Buthraupis. A molecular phylogenetic study published in 2010 found that Buthraupis was polyphyletic. To create monophyletic genera, the black-chested mountain tanager and the golden-backed mountain tanager were moved to the resurrected genus Cnemathraupis that had been erected by Thomas Penard in 1919 with the black-chested mountain tanager as the type species. The genus name combines the Ancient Greek knēmē meaning "leg" or "shin" and thraupis, an unknown small bird. The genus is sister to the grass-green tanager in the monotypic genus Chlorornis.

The genus contains the following two species:

Genus Cnemathraupis – Penard, 1919 – two species
Common name	Scientific name and subspecies	Range	Size and ecology	IUCN status and estimated population
Black-chested mountain tanager	Cnemathraupis eximia (Boissonneau, 1840)	Colombia, Ecuador, Peru, and Venezuela.	Size: Habitat: Diet:	LC
Golden-backed mountain tanager	Cnemathraupis aureodorsalis (Blake & Hocking, 1974)	central Peru	Size: Habitat: Diet:	EN
