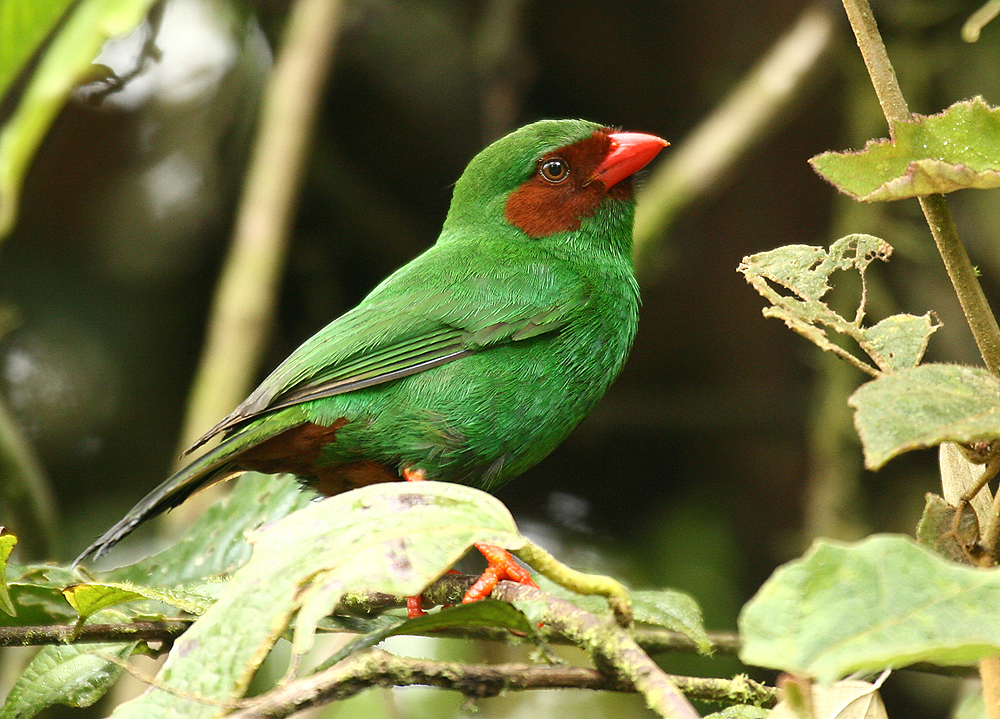

Conservation status
- Least Concern (IUCN 3.1)

Scientific classification
- Kingdom: Animalia
- Phylum: Chordata
- Class: Aves
- Order: Passeriformes
- Family: Thraupidae
- Genus: Chlorornis; Reichenbach, 1850
- Species: C. riefferii

Binomial name
- Chlorornis riefferii (Boissonneau, 1840)

= Grass-green tanager =

Species of bird

The grass-green tanager (Chlorornis riefferii) is a small South America bird in the tanager family Thraupidae. It is the only member of the genus Chlorornis.

The grass-green tanager is 20 cm in length and weighs 53g. It lives in and around subtropical and temperate forests in the Andes of Colombia, Ecuador, Bolivia, and Peru at elevations of 1500–3350 m.

It is seen in pairs or in groups of 3-6 individuals. It forages mostly on the upper half of short trees and eats fruits and insects. It is known to perch almost horizontally. Its nest is made of mosses and ferns, and its eggs are gray with light purple-grey dots.

== Taxonomy ==
The grass-green tanager was formally described in 1840 by the French ornithologist Auguste Boissonneau from a specimen collected near Bogotá in Colombia. He coined the binomial name Tanagra riefferii. The species is now the only member of the genus Chlorornis that was introduced in 1850 by the German naturalist Ludwig Reichenbach. The genus name combines the Ancient Greek khlōros meaning "green" and ornis meaning "bird". The specific epithet was chosen to honour the collector Gabriel Rieffer. The grass-green tanager has a sister relationship to the genus Cnemathraupis containing the black-chested mountain tanager and the golden-backed mountain tanager.

Five subspecies are recognised:

- C. r. riefferii (Boissonneau, 1840) – Colombia and Ecuador
- C. r. dilutus Zimmer, JT, 1947 – north Peru
- C. r. elegans (Tschudi, 1844) – central Peru
- C. r. celatus Zimmer, JT, 1947 – south Peru
- C. r. bolivianus (Berlepsch, 1912) – west Bolivia
