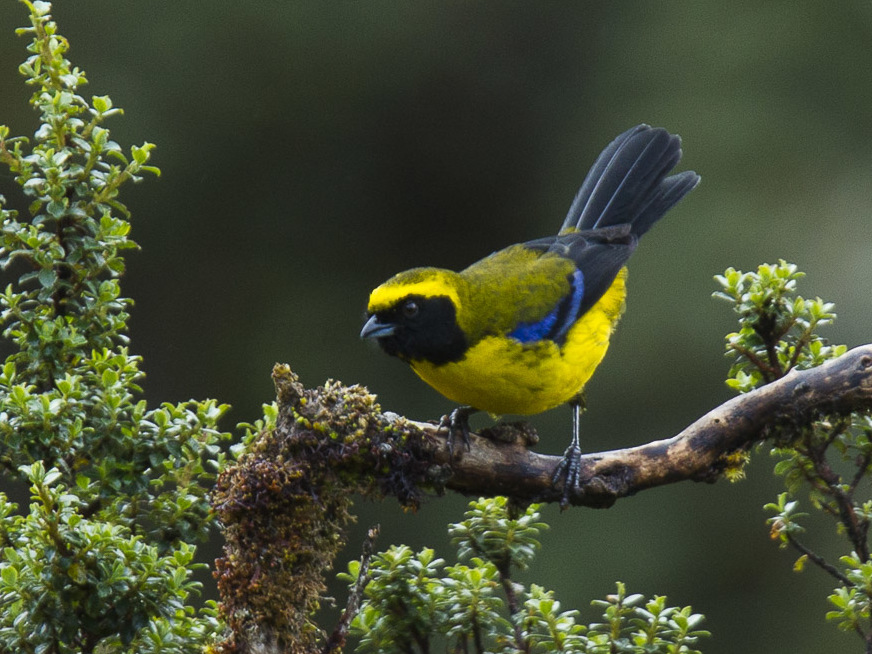

Conservation status
- Vulnerable (IUCN 3.1)

Scientific classification
- Kingdom: Animalia
- Phylum: Chordata
- Class: Aves
- Order: Passeriformes
- Family: Thraupidae
- Genus: Tephrophilus; R. T. Moore, 1934
- Species: T. wetmorei

Binomial name
- Tephrophilus wetmorei R. T. Moore, 1934

Synonyms
- Buthraupis wetmorei

= Masked mountain tanager =

Species of bird

The masked mountain tanager (Tephrophilus wetmorei) is a vulnerable species of bird in the tanager family Thraupidae. It is the only member of the genus Tephrophilus. This large and colourful tanager is endemic to elfin forest, woodland and shrub in the Andean highlands of southern Colombia, Ecuador and northern Peru. It is generally rare or uncommon, and is threatened by habitat loss.

== Taxonomy ==
The masked mountain tanager was formally described in 1934 by the American ornithologist Robert Thomas Moore from a specimen collected at the base of the Sangay volcano in Ecuador. He introduced a new monospecific genus Tephrophilus to give the binomial name Tephrophilus wetmorei. The generic name combines the Ancient Greek tephra meaning "ashes" (i.e. volcano) and philos meaning "-loving". The specific epithet was chosen to honour the ornithologist Alexander Wetmore. The species was subsequently placed in the genus Buthraupis but when a molecular phylogenetic study published in 2014 found Buthraupis was polyphyletic, the masked mountain tanager was returned to the resurrected genus Tephrophilus. The species is monotypic: no subspecies are recognised.

== Description ==
The masked mountain tanager is a large species, measuring 20 cm (7.9 in) long on average and weighing 62–63 g (2.2–2.2 oz). Male have black "masks" on their faces extending from the sides of the head down to the neck. There is a bright yellow band around the mask and on the forehead, separating the mask from the yellowish-olive crown and neck, which grade into the olive-green back. The rump is again bright yellow. The underparts are broadly bright mustard-yellow, brightest near the throat and neck, with olive streaks along the other portions. The wings and tail are blackish, except for the two violet-blue wingbars. The stubby bill is blackish with a gray base to the mandible. The legs are dark gray in color. Both sexes are similar in color, but females tend to be duller.

It looks somewhat similar to the hooded mountain tanager, but does not have blue upperparts or red eyes like that bird. The similar black-chested mountain tanager has a black throat and blue crown, unlike the present species.

== Distribution and habitat ==
The masked mountain tanager is endemic to the high Andes of Colombia, Ecuador, and Peru, where it inhabits mossy forests, moist dwarf forests, grass, bamboo, and mossy scrublands at elevations of 2,900–3,650 m (9,500–12,000 ft).
