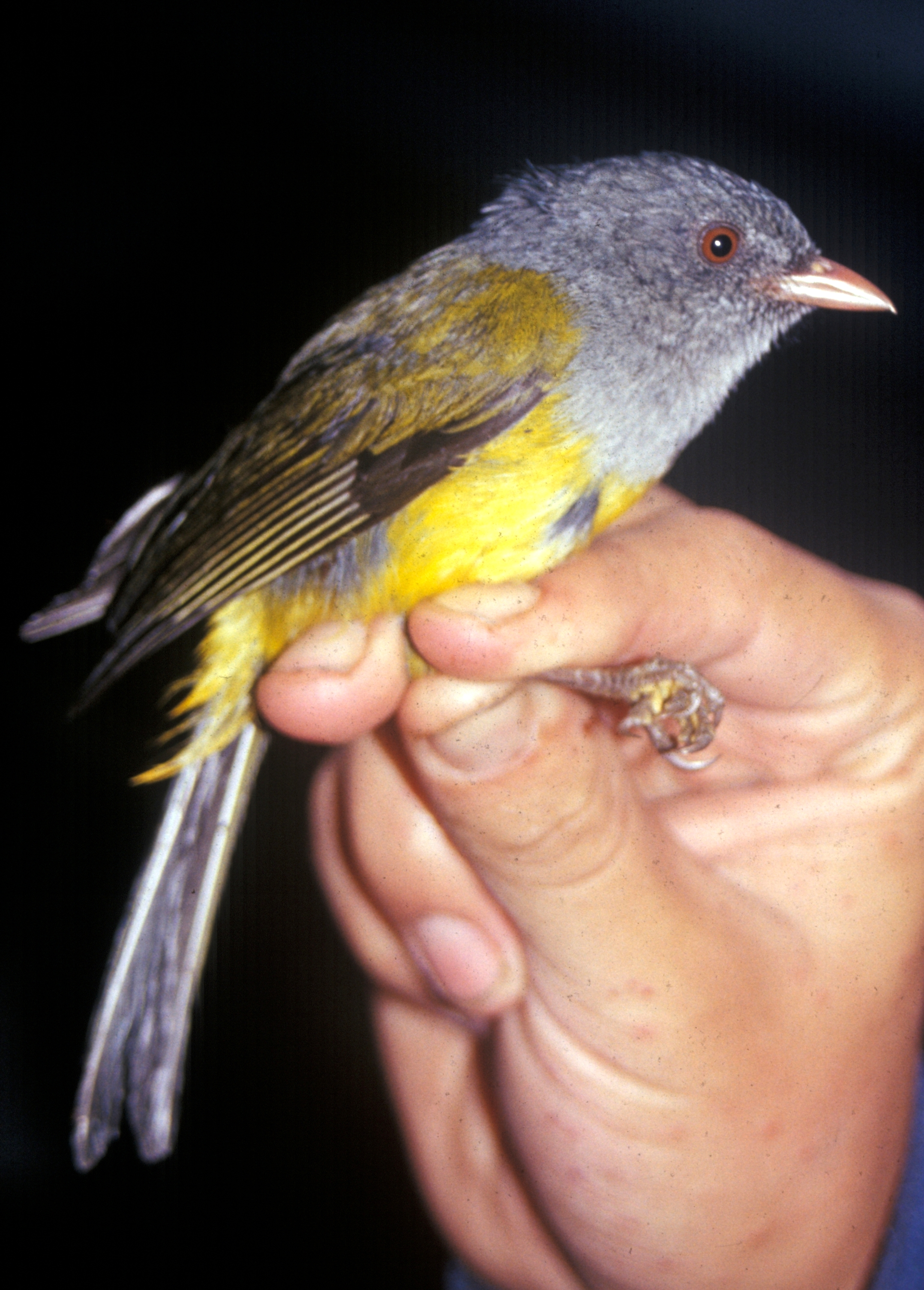
- Pink-billed cnemoscopus (Cnemoscopus rubrirostris)

Scientific classification
- Kingdom: Animalia
- Phylum: Chordata
- Class: Aves
- Order: Passeriformes
- Family: Thraupidae
- Genus: Cnemoscopus; Bangs & Penard, 1919

Type species
- Arremon rubrirostris Lafresnaye, 1840

= Cnemoscopus =

Genus of birds

Cnemoscopus is a genus of warbler-like birds in the tanager family Thraupidae. They are found on the eastern slopes of the Andes in northern South America.

== Taxonomy ==
The genus Cnemoscopus was introduced in 1919 by the American ornithologists Outram Bangs and Thomas Penard. They designated the type species as Arremon rubrirostris, Lafresnaye, 1840, the pink-billed cnemoscopus. The genus name combines the Ancient Greek knēmos meaning "mountain-slope" with skopos meaning "searcher" or "watcher".

The genus contains the following two species:

Image	Common name	Scientific name	Distribution
	Pink-billed cnemoscopus	Cnemoscopus rubrirostris	Andes of Colombia to southwestern Venezuela (Táchira), eastern Ecuador, and northern Peru
	Black-billed cnemoscopus	Cnemoscopus chrysogaster	Andes of Peru in Cusco) and disjunctly in western Bolivia (near Tokoaque, in La Paz)
