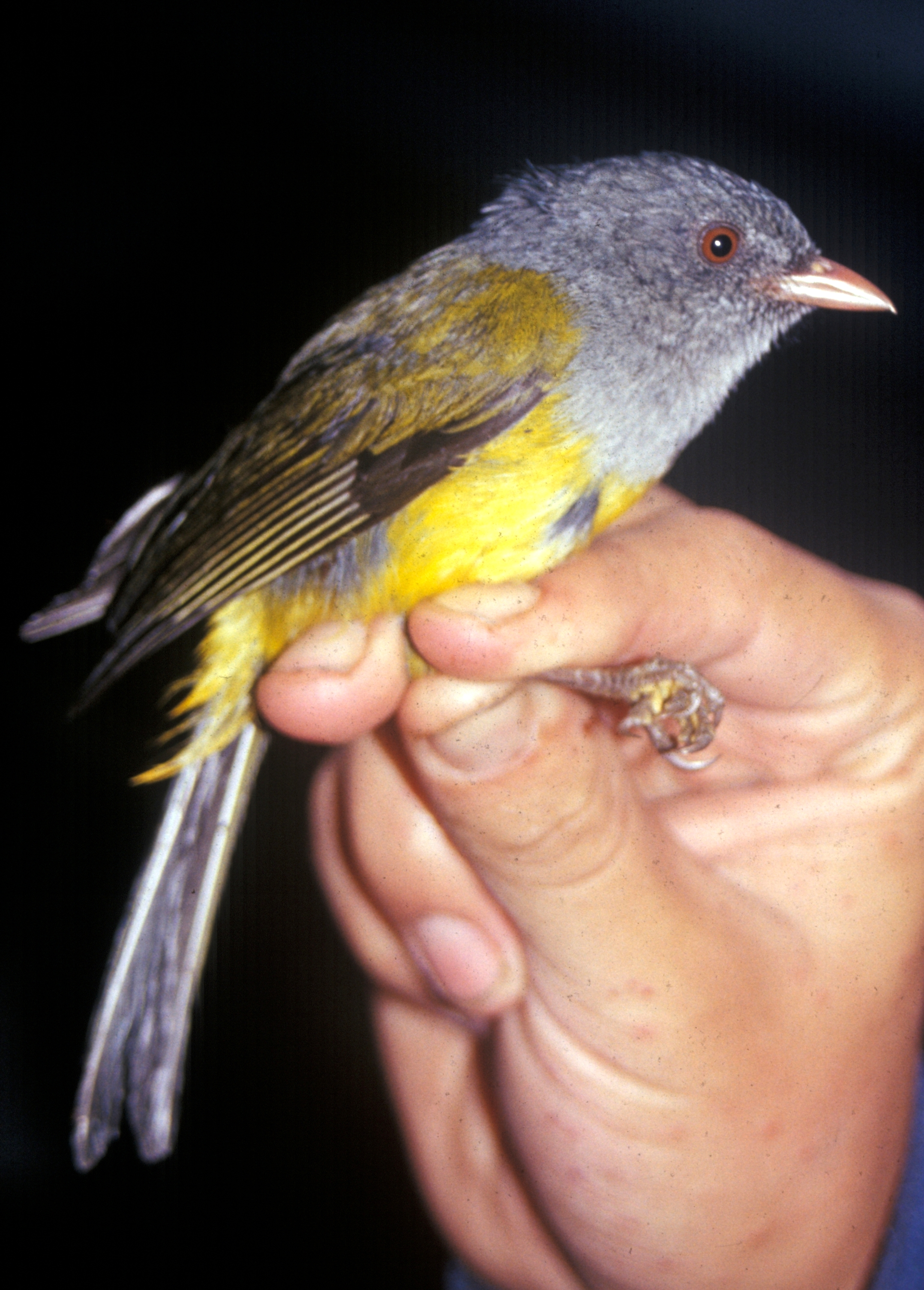
- From Cordillera del Cóndor, Ecuador.

Conservation status
- Least Concern (IUCN 3.1)

Scientific classification
- Kingdom: Animalia
- Phylum: Chordata
- Class: Aves
- Order: Passeriformes
- Family: Thraupidae
- Genus: Cnemoscopus; Bangs & Penard, 1919
- Species: C. rubrirostris

Binomial name
- Cnemoscopus rubrirostris (Lafresnaye, 1840)

= Pink-billed cnemoscopus =

Species of bird

The pink-billed cnemoscopus or grey-hooded bush tanager (Cnemoscopus rubrirostris) is a species of South American bird in the tanager family Thraupidae. It is found in Bolivia, Colombia, Ecuador, Peru, and Venezuela. Its natural habitat is subtropical or tropical moist montane forests. It was formerly treated as conspecific with the black-billed cnemoscopus (Cnemoscopus chrysogaster).

== Taxonomy ==
The pink-billed cnemoscopus was formally described in 1840 by the French ornithologist Frédéric de Lafresnaye from a sample collected near Bogotá in Colombia. He coined the binomial name Arremon rubrirostris. The grey-hooded bush tanager is now the only species placed in the genus Cnemoscopus that was introduced in 1919 by the American ornithologists Outram Bangs and Thomas Penard. The genus name combines the Ancient Greek knēmos meaning "mountain-slope" with skopos meaning "searcher" or "watcher". The specific epithet rubrirostris combines the Latin ruber meaning "red" with -rostris meaning "billed". The species is monotypic, no subspecies are recognised.
