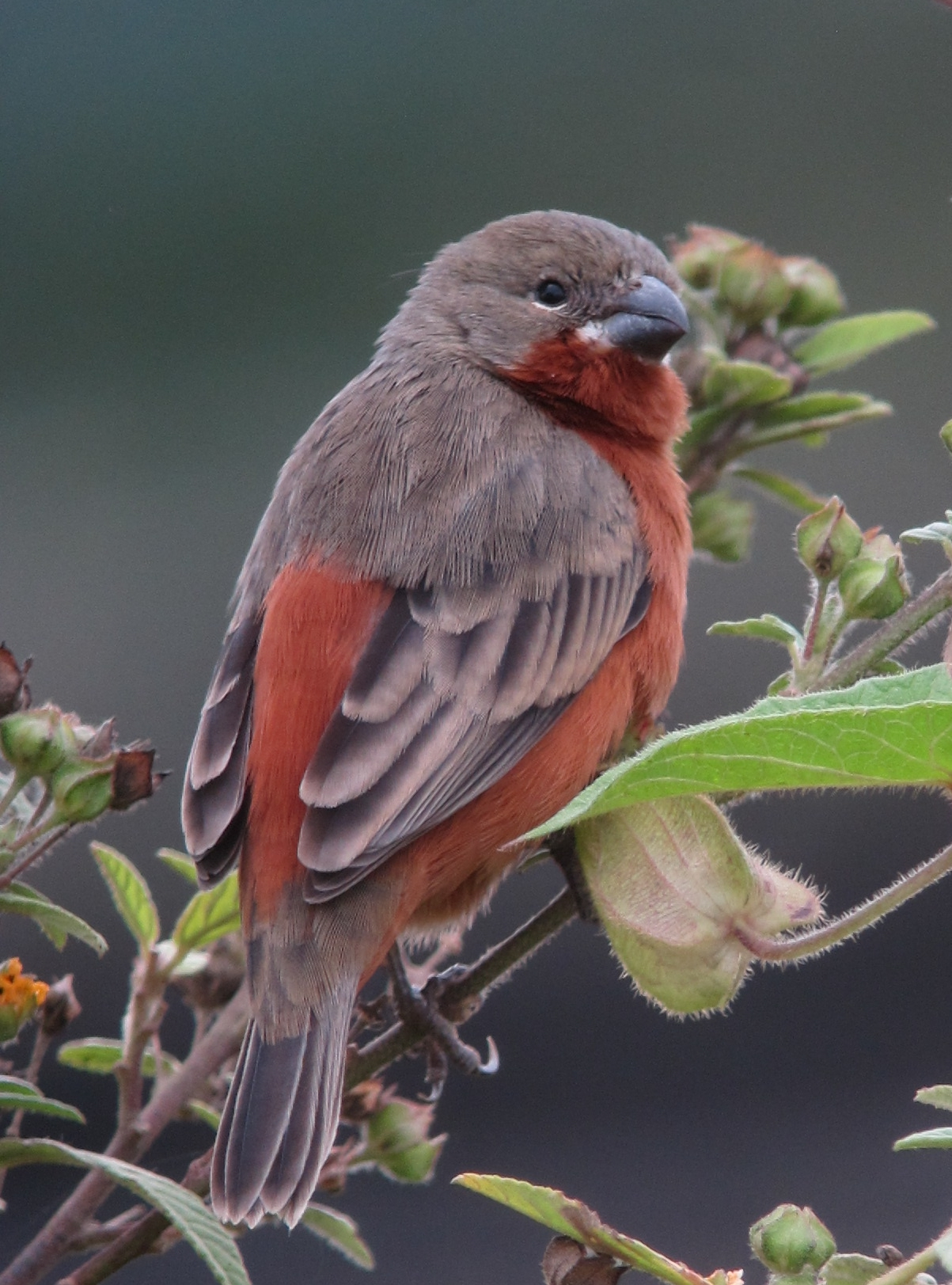

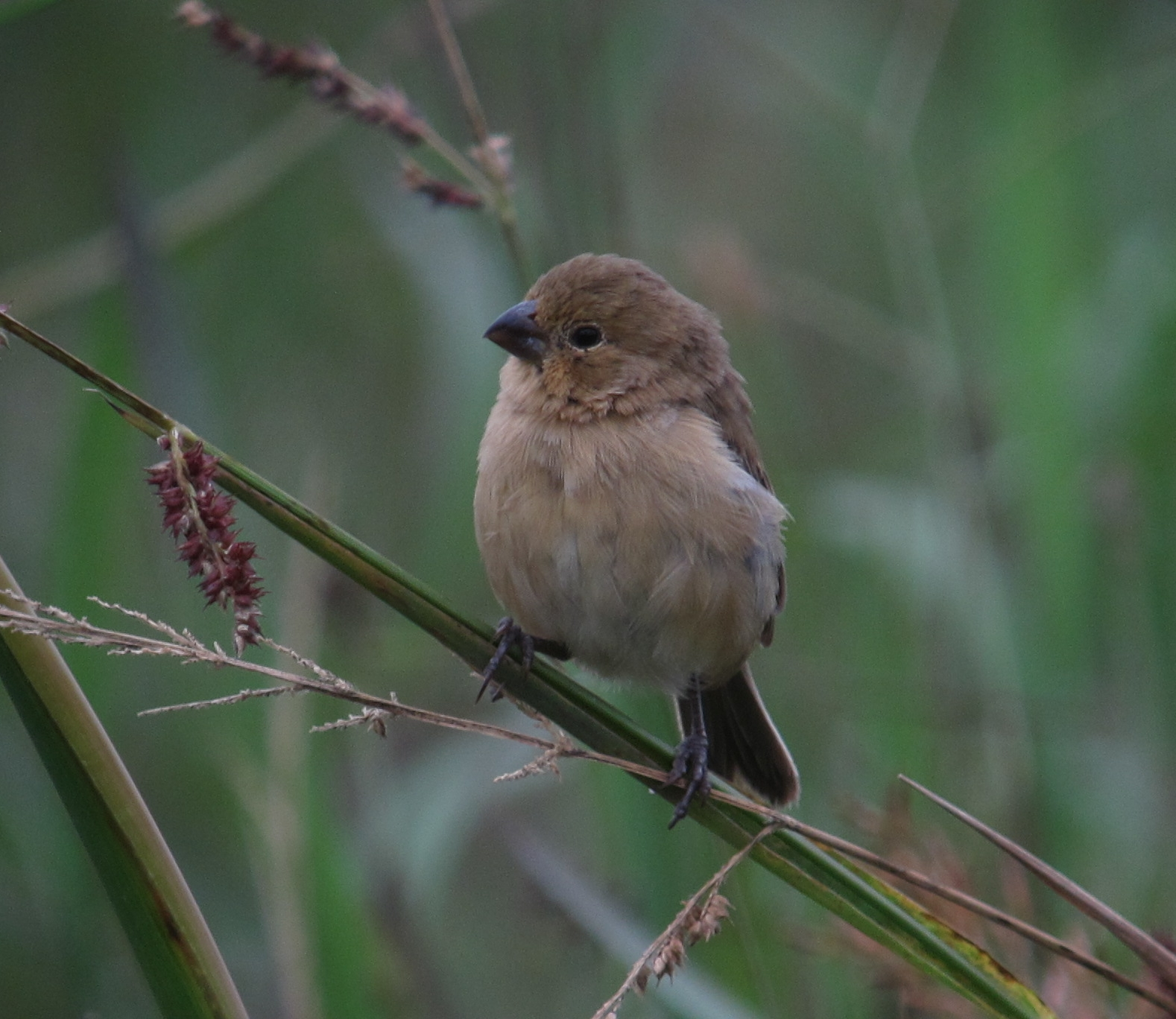
- Male above female below

Conservation status
- Least Concern (IUCN 3.1)

Scientific classification
- Kingdom: Animalia
- Phylum: Chordata
- Class: Aves
- Order: Passeriformes
- Family: Thraupidae
- Genus: Sporophila
- Species: S. minuta

Binomial name
- Sporophila minuta (Linnaeus, 1758)

Synonyms
- Loxia minuta (protonym)

= Ruddy-breasted seedeater =

Species of bird

The ruddy-breasted seedeater (Sporophila minuta) is a species of bird in the tanager family Thraupidae, the tanagers and allies. It is found in Mexico, most Central American countries, and across northern South America.

== Taxonomy and systematics ==
The ruddy-breasted seedeater has a somewhat complicated taxonomic history. It was formally described by the Swedish naturalist Carl Linnaeus in 1758 in the tenth edition of his Systema Naturae under the binomial name Loxia minuta. The type locality is Suriname. The specific epithet is from Latin minutus meaning "little" or "small". By 1938 it had been reassigned to the genus Sporophila that had been introduced by the German ornithologist Jean Cabanis in 1844. The genus was then in the family Fringillidae. By 1970 the genus had been reassigned to the family Emberizidae. Based on studies published between 1988 and 2011, beginning in 2012 Sporophila was moved to the tanager family Thraupidae.

The ruddy-breasted seedeater has these three subspecies:

- S. m. parva (Lawrence, 1883)
- S. m. centralis Bangs & Penard, TE, 1918
- S. m. minuta (Linnaeus, 1758)

For much of the twentieth century what is now the tawny-bellied seedeater (S. hypoxantha) was treated as another subspecies.

== Description ==
The ruddy-breasted seedeater is 8.6 to 9.6 cm (3.4 to 3.8 in) long and weighs 7 to 9 g (0.25 to 0.32 oz). It is one of the smallest of its genus. It has a short, thick bill with a rounded culmen. The species is sexually dimorphic. Adult males of the nominate subspecies S. m. minuta have a medium gray head with a tiny white spot behind the bill. Their upper back is medium gray with faint brownish streaks. Their lower back and rump are rufous, their longest uppertail coverts medium gray, and the rest rufous. Their tail is mostly blackish with olive feather edges. Their wings are blackish brown with wide grayish edges on the coverts and tertials. Their wing's primaries have white bases that show as a white rectangle on the folded wing. Their throat and underparts are rufous. Females have a warm buffy brown head and upperparts. Their wings and tail are a slightly darker buffy brown. Their throat and underparts are buffy brown that is paler buff on the throat and belly. Males of subspecies S. m. parva have more blue-gray, without brown, upperparts than the nominate. Females have warmer buff underparts. Males of S. m. centralis have a brownish wash on their upperparts and paler underparts than the nominate. Females are like the nominate. Both sexes of all subspecies have a dark brown iris and blackish legs. Males have a blackish bill and females a dark horn one.

== Distribution and habitat ==
The ruddy-breasted seedeater has a disjunct distribution: Each subspecies is separate from the others. The subspecies are found thus:

- S. m. parva: from Nayarit in western Mexico south on the Pacific lowlands through southern Guatemala, El Salvador, extreme southern Honduras, and Nicaragua slightly into northern Costa Rica's Alajuela Province
- S. m. centralis: from southern San José and southern Puntarenas provinces in southwestern Costa Rica south along most of the Pacific slope of Panama
- S. m. minuta: from west of the Andes in northwestern Venezuela south through all three ranges of the Colombian Andes into northwestern Ecuador at least to western Imbabura Province; from southwestern Colombia widening northeast to Venezuela, there across most of the northern half of the country, western Amazonas, and eastern Bolívar states, continuing across the northern parts of the Guianas into northeastern Brazil around the mouth of the Amazon River in Amapá and Pará states; Trinidad but not Tobago; and a few scattered records in far northwestern Brazil adjacent to Colombia and Venezuela

The ruddy-breasted seedeater inhabits open landscapes including savanna, grassy areas with brambles (Rubus) and wild roses (Rubus), parks and lawns in settled areas, and clearings in forest. In Mexico and Central America it ranges from sea level to 1,100 m (3,600 ft) though only to 500 m (1,600 ft) in Guatemala, El Salvador, and Honduras. It reaches 2,400 m (7,900 ft) in Colombia, 1,500 m (4,900 ft) in Ecuador, and 1,600 m (5,200 ft) in Venezuela and Brazil.

== Behavior ==
=== Movement ===
The ruddy-breasted seedeater is mostly a sedentary resident though it is known to wander when grass seeds are scarce in an area.

=== Feeding ===
The ruddy-breasted seedeater feeds primarily on grass seeds, though it includes small amounts of other seeds, fruit, and arthropods in its diet. It feeds mostly while clinging to grass stems, sometimes becoming upside-down when stems bend. It often forages in groups that include other seed-eating species.

=== Breeding ===
The ruddy-breasted seedeater's breeding season has not been fully defined, but spans June to August in Central America and April to September in Colombia. Its nest is a messy cup made from grasses and is typically in a low bush, tree, or grass clump not far above the ground. The clutch is two or three eggs that are white with brown spots. The incubation period, time to fledging, and details of parental care are not known.

=== Vocalization ===
The ruddy-breasted seedeater's song is a "simple, but sweet and plaintive, see-seeur tee-te-e-e-e, seeeeur tse-e-e-e-e". Its call is a geographically variable "sharp chip or chink".

== Status ==
The IUCN has assessed the ruddy-breasted seedeater as being of Least Concern. It has an extremely large range; its estimated population of at least 500,000 mature individuals is believed to be decreasing. No immediate threats have been identified. It is considered fairly common in northern Central America, uncommon in Costa Rica, common in Colombia, local in Ecuador, "common and widespread" in Venezuela, and "common to frequent" in northeastern Brazil.
