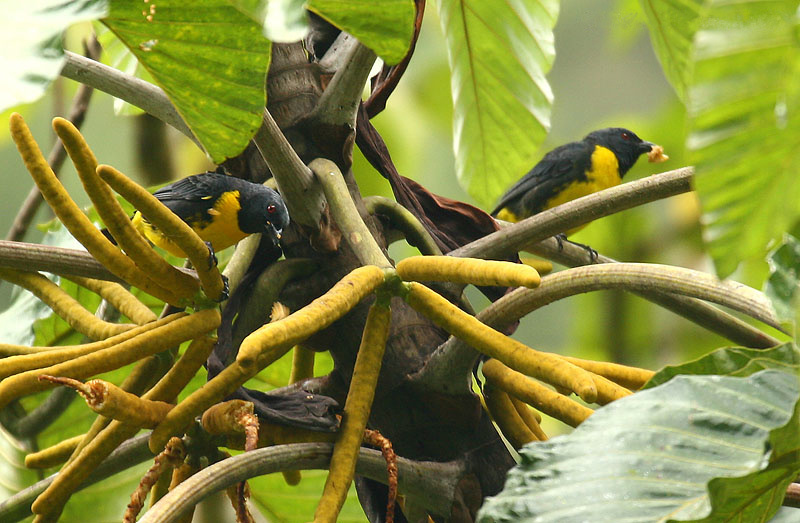
- Blue-and-gold tanager, Bangsia arcaei

Scientific classification
- Kingdom: Animalia
- Phylum: Chordata
- Class: Aves
- Order: Passeriformes
- Family: Thraupidae
- Genus: Bangsia; Penard, 1919

Type species
- Buthraupis caeruleigularis Ridgway, 1893

Species
- See text

= Bangsia =

Genus of birds

Bangsia is a genus of Neotropical birds in the tanager family Thraupidae. They are native to humid forests in Colombia, Ecuador, Panama and Costa Rica.

== Taxonomy and species list ==
The genus Bangsia was introduce in 1919 by the ornithologist Thomas Edward Penard with a subspecies of the blue-and-gold tanager Buthraupis arcaei caeruleigularis as the type. The genus name honours the American ornithologist Outram Bangs. A molecular phylogenetic study published in 2014 found that the genus Bangsia was sister to the genus Wetmorethraupis which contains only a single species, the orange-throated tanager.

The genus contains the following six species:

Genus Bangsia – Penard, 1919 – six species
Common name	Scientific name and subspecies	Range	Size and ecology	IUCN status and estimated population
Blue-and-gold tanager	Bangsia arcaei (Sclater, PL & Salvin, 1869)	Talamancan montane forests and the Serranía del Darién	Size: Habitat: Diet:	NT
Black-and-gold tanager	Bangsia melanochlamys (Hellmayr, 1910)	Endemic to Colombia	Size: Habitat: Subtropical or tropical moist montane forests Diet:	LC
Golden-chested tanager	Bangsia rothschildi (Berlepsch, 1897)	Colombia and Ecuador	Size: Habitat: Narrow elevational band of humid, heavily forested tropical lowland evergreen forests, pre-montane forests, forest borders and edges, and pluvial foothill forests in the Lower Tropical Zone, typically in the mid-levels and subcanopy; also montane evergreen forest Diet:	LC
Moss-backed tanager	Bangsia edwardsi (Elliot, 1865)	Endemic to the Western Andes of western Colombia and northwestern Ecuador, on the Pacific slope	Size: Habitat: Dense, humid Pacific slope forests, usually premontane forest between tropical lowland and montane evergreen forests, also woodland edge, secondary growth and clearings; typically 600–2,200 m (2,000–7,200 ft), usually 500–1,100 m (1,600–3,600 ft) in Ecuador Diet: Insects and fruit; forages in the middle or upper canopy, sometimes lower, gleaning arthropods from thick vegetation and epiphytes, flutter-pursuing flushed insects and sallying for flying invertebrates, and eating fruit while perching; alone, in pairs, in small flocks or in mixed-species flocks	LC Decreasing
Gold-ringed tanager	Bangsia aureocincta (Hellmayr, 1910)	Endemic to Colombia, on the slopes of the western cordillera of the Andes, in three small populations around the Tatamá massif	Size: About 16 cm (6.3 in); 35–45 g (1.2–1.6 oz) Habitat: Wet, mossy, mature or secondary Andean cloud forest with canopy heights of 9–12 m (30–39 ft), avoiding fragmented forest, pastures and human settlements; 1,350–2,195 m (4,400–7,200 ft), mostly at or above 1,700 m (5,600 ft) Diet: 70–90% fruit, the remainder insects; forages among moss and epiphytes from the upper understory to the mid-canopy, solitarily, in pairs or family groups, and in mixed-species flocks; occasionally sallies for insects	VU 600–1,700 mature individuals
Yellow-green tanager	Bangsia flavovirens (Lawrence, 1867)	Colombia and Ecuador	Size: Habitat: Subtropical or tropical moist lowland forest and subtropical or tropical moist montane forest Diet:	VU
