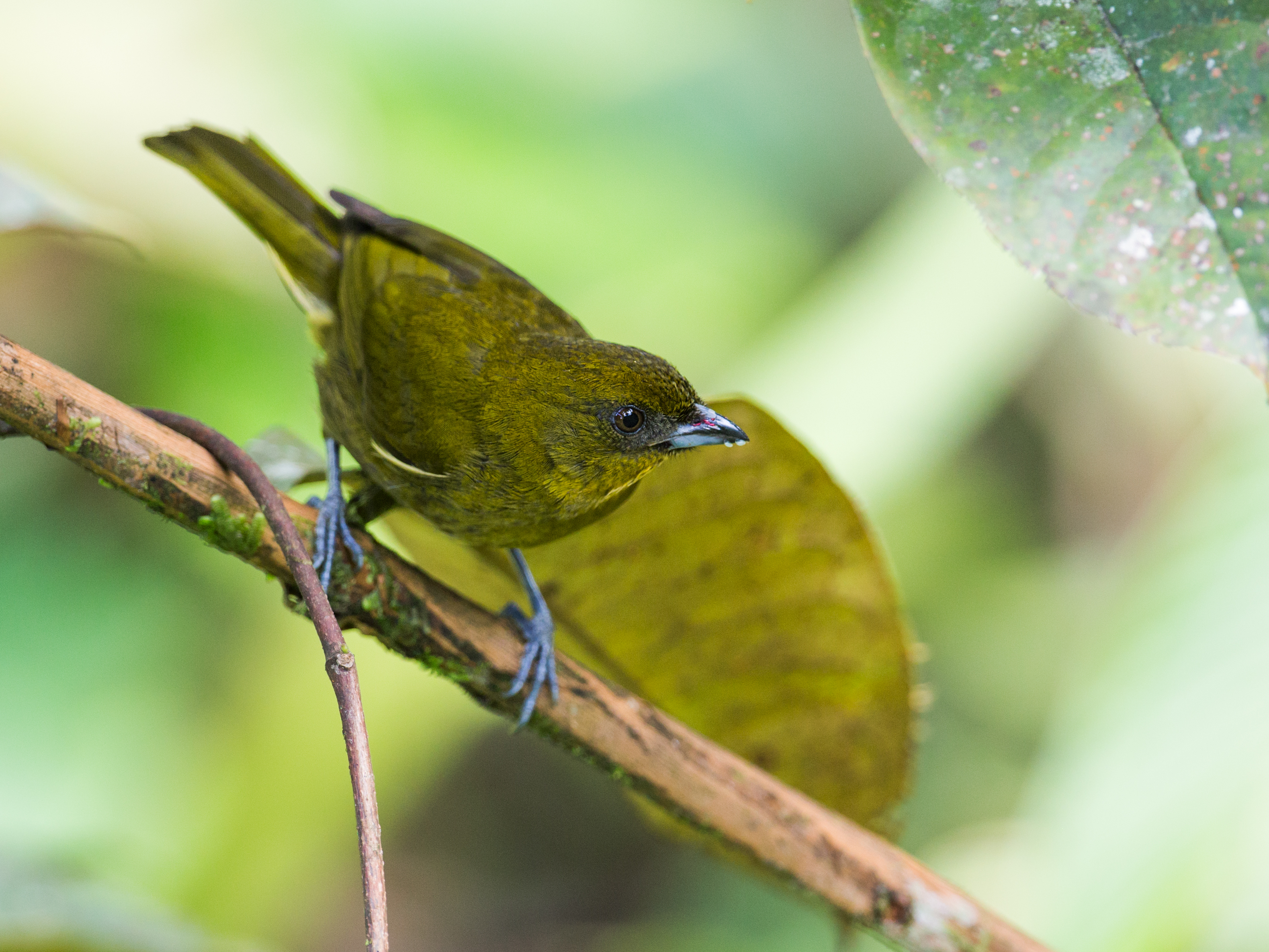

Conservation status
- Vulnerable (IUCN 3.1)

Scientific classification
- Kingdom: Animalia
- Phylum: Chordata
- Class: Aves
- Order: Passeriformes
- Family: Thraupidae
- Genus: Bangsia
- Species: B. flavovirens

Binomial name
- Bangsia flavovirens (Lawrence, 1867)

Synonyms
- Chlorospingus flavovirens

= Yellow-green tanager =

Species of bird

The yellow-green tanager (Bangsia flavovirens) is a species of bird in the family Thraupidae. It was formerly known as the yellow-green bush tanager or yellow-green chlorospingus as it used to be placed in the genus Chlorospingus with other bush tanagers. Chlorospingus as a whole was formerly placed in the tanager family Thraupidae, but was transferred to the New World sparrows when genetic analysis of two Chlorospingus species revealed they were embedded within the latter family. However, more recently, molecular analysis of additional Chlorospingus species found that the yellow-green tanager is not a member of Chlorospingus (or any other New World sparrow) but a true tanager after all, most closely related to the blue-and-gold tanager, so the species was returned to Thraupidae and placed in the genus Bangsia.

The yellow-green tanager is found in Colombia and Ecuador. Its natural habitats are subtropical or tropical moist lowland forest and subtropical or tropical moist montane forest. It is threatened by habitat loss.
