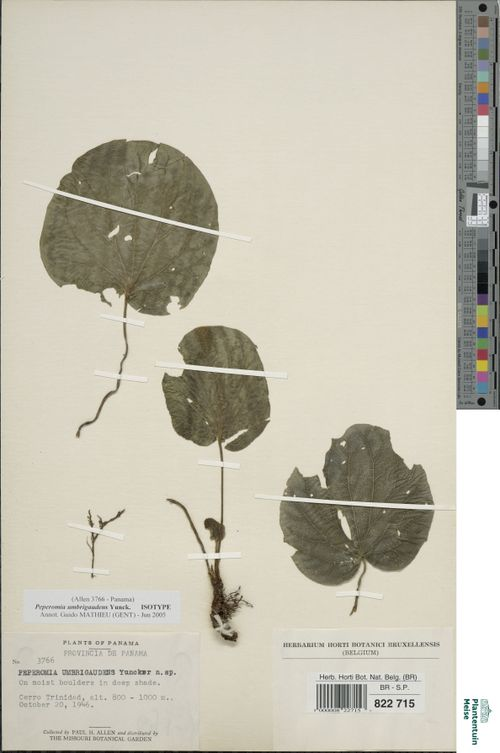

Scientific classification
- Kingdom: Plantae
- Clade: Tracheophytes
- Clade: Angiosperms
- Clade: Magnoliids
- Order: Piperales
- Family: Piperaceae
- Genus: Peperomia
- Species: P. umbrigaudens

Binomial name
- Peperomia umbrigaudens Yunck.

= Peperomia umbrigaudens =

Species of epiphyte

Peperomia umbrigaudens is a species of epiphyte from the genus Peperomia. It was first described by Truman G. Yuncker and published in the book "Annals of the Missouri Botanical Garden 37(1): 81. 1950. (31 Mar 1950)". It primarily grows on wet tropical biomes.

== Distribution ==
It is endemic to Colombia and Panama

- Colombia
  - Antioquia
    - Urrao
    - Frontino
  - Chocó
    - San José del Palmar
- Panama
  - Coclé
    - La Pintada
  - Colón
    - Portobelo
  - Darién
  - Panamá Oeste
    - Capiro

== Description ==
It is a rhizomatous succulent herb with alternate leaves that are rounded-ovate to up to 11 cm broad, obtuse or subacute at the apex, deeply cordate at the base, open sinus, and sat scattered villous below to the veins more densely villous; the petiole can grow up to 15 cm long, quite slender, hairy near the plate, glabrous below, with solitary spikes; the peduncle is about 6 cm long and clearly hairy; the ovary is subturbinated, the apex is submammiform, and the apical stigma is occasionally bifid.

It resembles Peperomia asarifolia but differs because of the pubescence of the leaves, petioles, and peduncles (due to longer peduncles, etc.).
