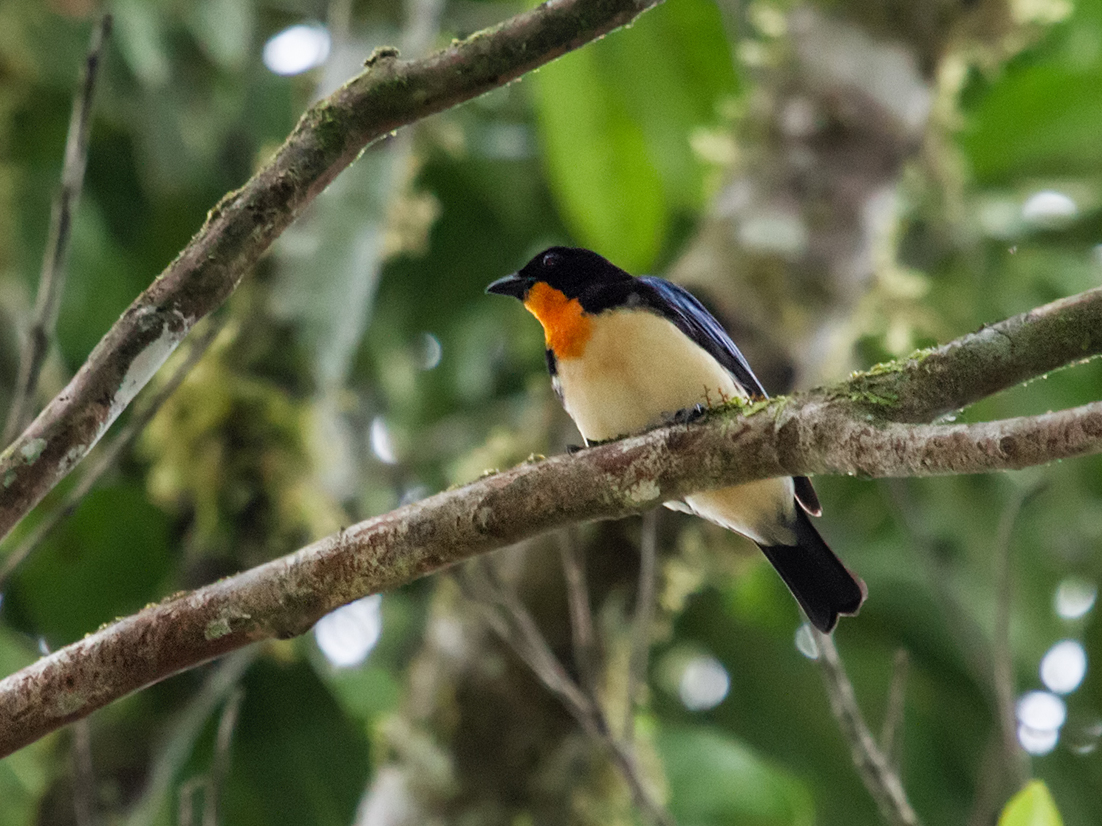

Conservation status
- Vulnerable (IUCN 3.1)

Scientific classification
- Kingdom: Animalia
- Phylum: Chordata
- Class: Aves
- Order: Passeriformes
- Family: Thraupidae
- Genus: Wetmorethraupis; Lowery & O'Neill, 1964
- Species: W. sterrhopteron

Binomial name
- Wetmorethraupis sterrhopteron Lowery & O'Neill, 1964

= Orange-throated tanager =

Species of bird

The orange-throated tanager (Wetmorethraupis sterrhopteron) is a species of bird in the tanager family Thraupidae that is found very locally in humid forests around the Ecuador-Peru border. As a species it is considered threatened. The orange-throated tanager is the only member of the genus Wetmorethraupis, named after the ornithologist Alexander Wetmore. It is closely related to members of the genus Bangsia.

== Taxonomy ==
The orange-throated tanager was formally described by George Lowery and John O'Neill in 1964. The authors placed the species in a new genus Wetmorethraupis to give the binomial name Wetmorethraupis sterrhopteron. The genus name honours the American ornithologist Alexander Wetmore by combining his name with the genus name Thraupis, the type genus of the tanager family Thraupidae. The specific epithet combines the Ancient Greek sterrhos meaning "stiff" or "hard" with pteron meaning feather.

A molecular phylogenetic study published in 2014 found that Wetmorethraupis was the sister taxon to Bangsia. The orange-throated tanager is monotypic: no subspecies are recognised.
