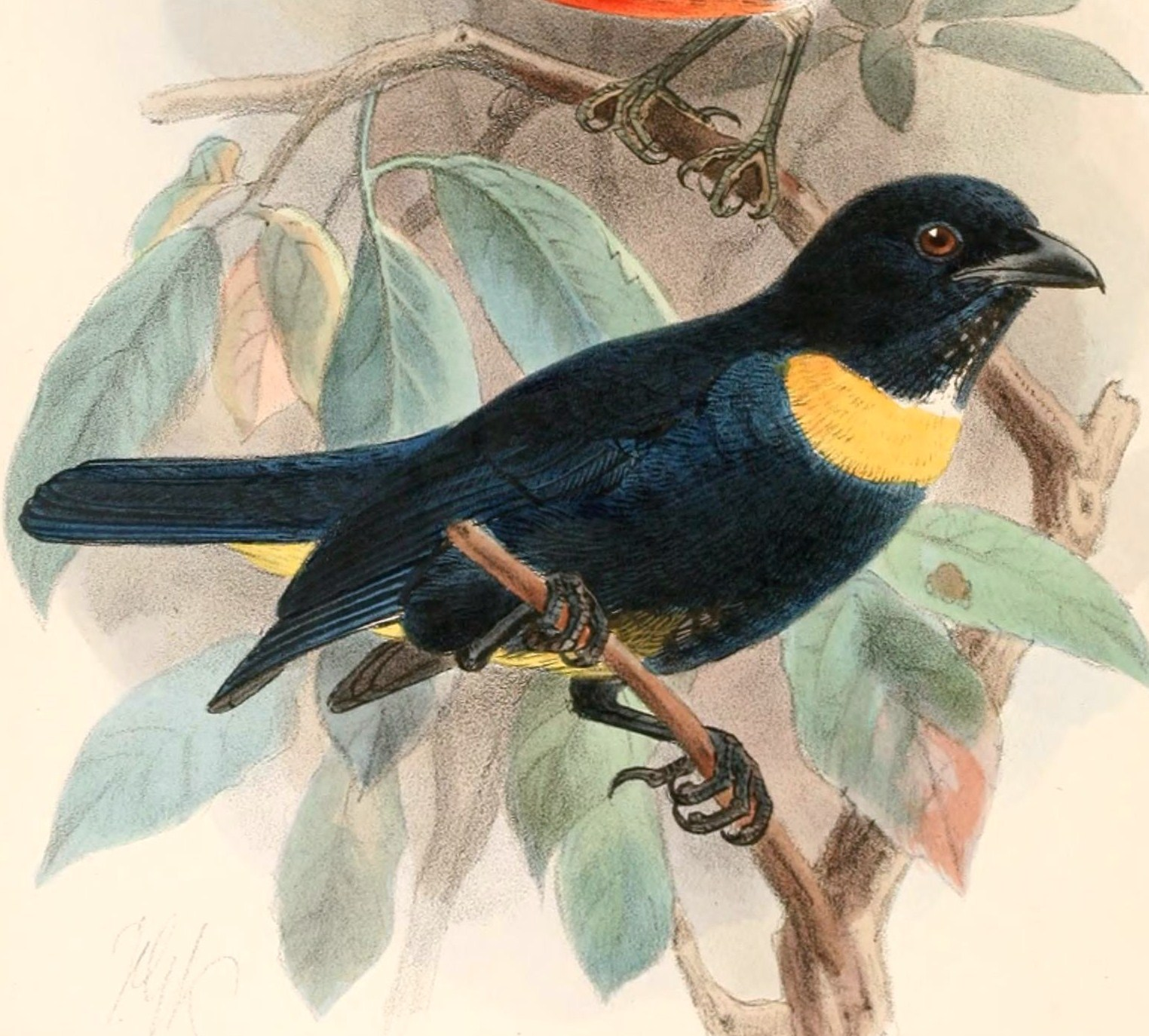

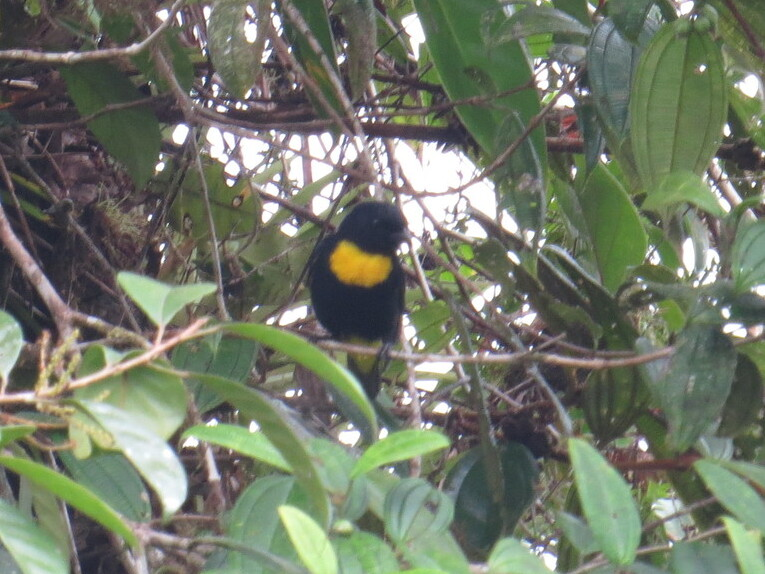

Conservation status
- Least Concern (IUCN 3.1)

Scientific classification
- Kingdom: Animalia
- Phylum: Chordata
- Class: Aves
- Order: Passeriformes
- Family: Thraupidae
- Genus: Bangsia
- Species: B. rothschildi

Binomial name
- Bangsia rothschildi (Berlepsch, 1897)

= Golden-chested tanager =

Species of bird

The golden-chested tanager (Bangsia rothschildi) is a species of bird in the family Thraupidae. It is found in Colombia and Ecuador. Its natural habitats are subtropical or tropical moist lowland forests and subtropical or tropical moist montane forests.

== Etymology ==
Both parts of the Latin binomial honor early ornithologists. Bangsia is named for Outram Bangs, a United States zoologist and collector; the specific epithet rothschildi honors Lionel Walter Rothschild, 2nd Baron Rothschild of Tring who was an English ornithologist, entomologist, collector, and publisher.

== Distribution ==
Bangsia rothschildi is endemic to the northwestern South American countries of Colombia and Ecuador.

== Habitat ==
The golden-chested tanager can be found in a narrow elevational band of humid and heavily forested tropical lowland evergreen forests, pre-montane forests, forest borders and edges, and pluvial foothill forests in the Lower Tropical Zone in Ecuador and Colombia. Typically the species is seen in the mid-levels and subcanopy forest strata. Additional habitats used by this species include Montane Evergreen Forest.

== Appearance ==
The golden-chested tanager is an attractive glossy dark navy-blue to black tinged blue-violet bird, featuring bright golden-yellow patches on the chest, the lower-belly to the crissum, and on the underwing coverts, which contrasts with the blackish flight-feathers. It is a chunky medium-sized bird with a large head, a robust short mandible, and a relatively short tail.
