= Black-billed cnemoscopus =

Conservation status
- Not evaluated (IUCN 3.1)

Scientific classification
- Kingdom: Animalia
- Phylum: Chordata
- Class: Aves
- Order: Passeriformes
- Family: Thraupidae
- Genus: Cnemoscopus
- Species: C. chrysogaster

Binomial name
- Cnemoscopus chrysogaster (Taczanowski, 1875)

Species of bird

The black-billed cnemoscopus (Cnemoscopus chrysogaster) is a small bird in the tanager family Thraupidae. It is found on the eastern slopes of the Andes in Peru and the extreme north of Bolivia. Its natural habitat is subtropical or tropical moist montane forests. It was formerly considered to be conspecific with the pink-billed cnemoscopus (Cnemoscopus rubrirostris).

== Taxonomy ==
The black-billed cnemoscopus was formally described in 1875 by the Polish zoologist Władysław Taczanowski under the binomial name Chlorospingus chrysogaster based on a specimen collected at Tambapota (now Tambopata) in the southeastern Peru. The specific epithet combines the Ancient Greek χρυσος/khrusos meaning "gold" with γαστηρ/gastēr, γαστρος/gastros meaning "belly". This species was formerly treated as a subspecies of the pink-billed cnemoscopus (Cnemoscopus rubrirostris).
