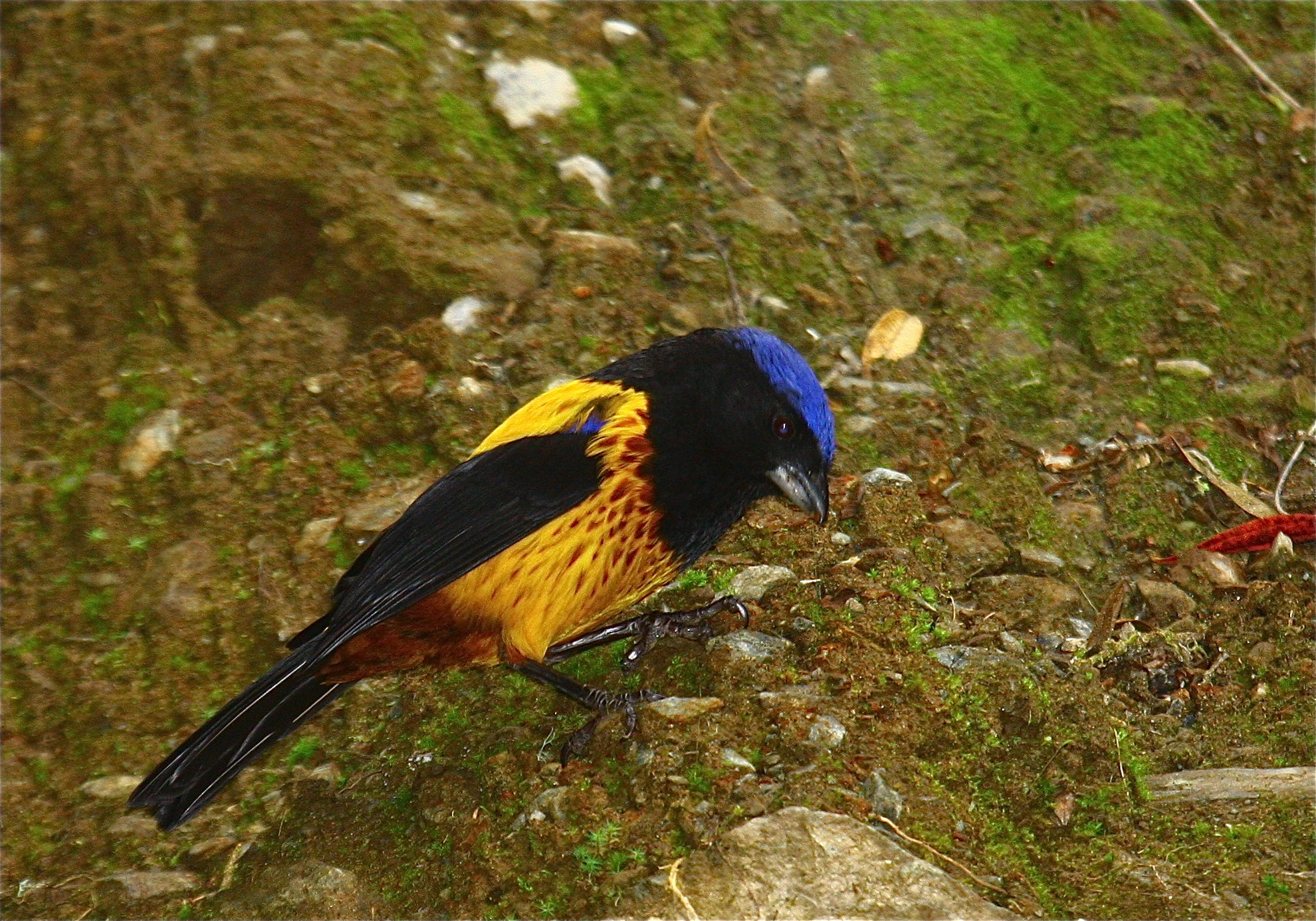

Conservation status
- Near Threatened (IUCN 3.1)

Scientific classification
- Kingdom: Animalia
- Phylum: Chordata
- Class: Aves
- Order: Passeriformes
- Family: Thraupidae
- Genus: Cnemathraupis
- Species: C. aureodorsalis

Binomial name
- Cnemathraupis aureodorsalis (Blake & Hocking, 1974)

Synonyms
- Buthraupis aureodorsalis

= Golden-backed mountain tanager =

Species of bird

The golden-backed mountain tanager (Cnemathraupis aureodorsalis) is an Near Threatened species of bird in the tanager family. This large and brightly colored tanager is endemic to elfin forests in the Andean highlands of central Peru. It is threatened by habitat loss.

This species was formerly included in the genus Buthraupis. When a molecular phylogenetic study published in 2010 found that Buthraupis was polyphyletic, the golden-backed mountain tanager was moved to the resurrected genus Cnemathraupis.
