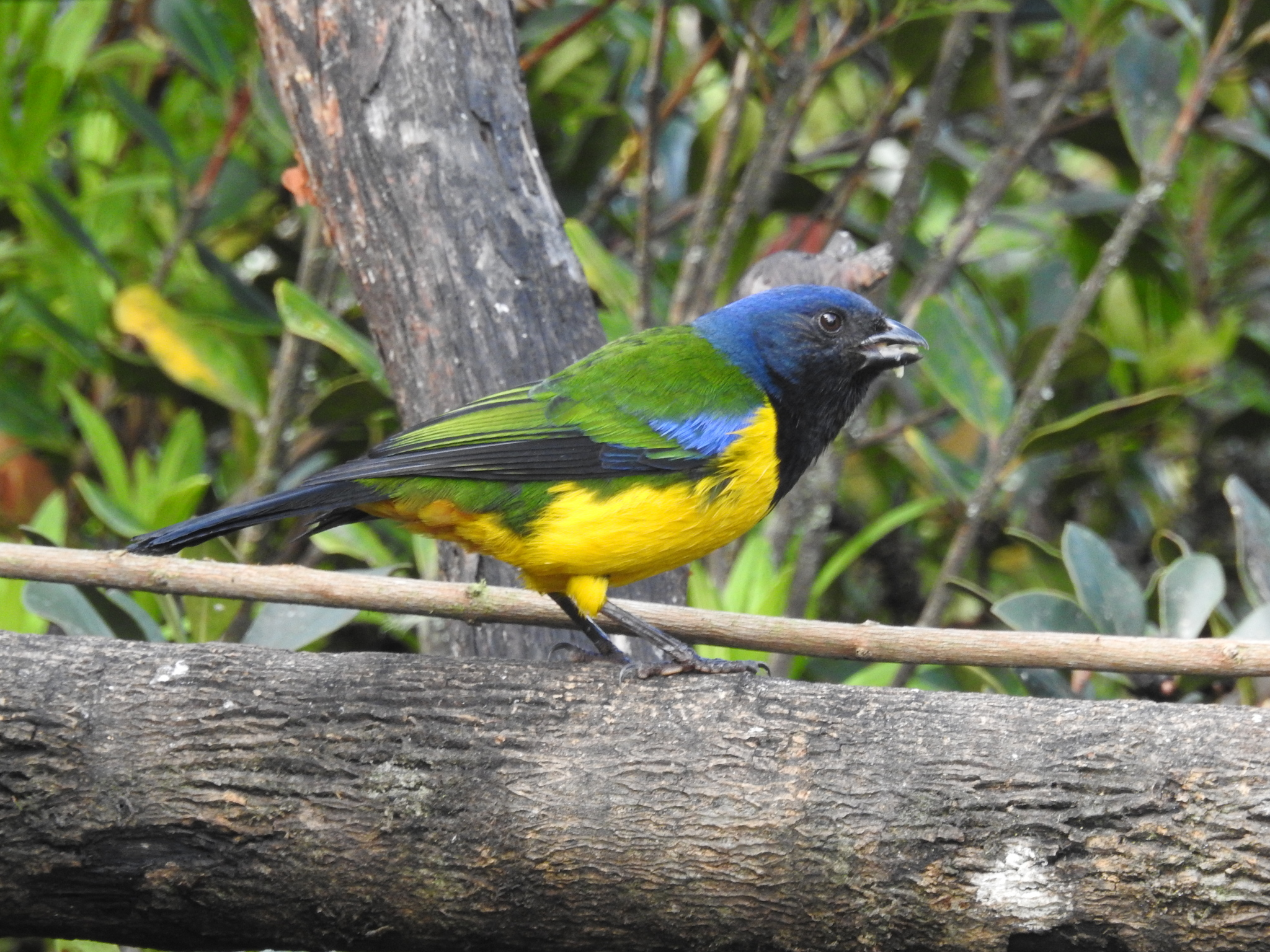

Conservation status
- Least Concern (IUCN 3.1)

Scientific classification
- Kingdom: Animalia
- Phylum: Chordata
- Class: Aves
- Order: Passeriformes
- Family: Thraupidae
- Genus: Cnemathraupis
- Species: C. eximia

Binomial name
- Cnemathraupis eximia (Boissonneau, 1840)

Synonyms
- Buthraupis eximia

= Black-chested mountain tanager =

Species of bird

The black-chested mountain tanager (Cnemathraupis eximia) is a species of bird in the family Thraupidae.

It is found in Colombia, Ecuador, Peru, and Venezuela. Its natural habitat is subtropical or tropical moist montane forests.

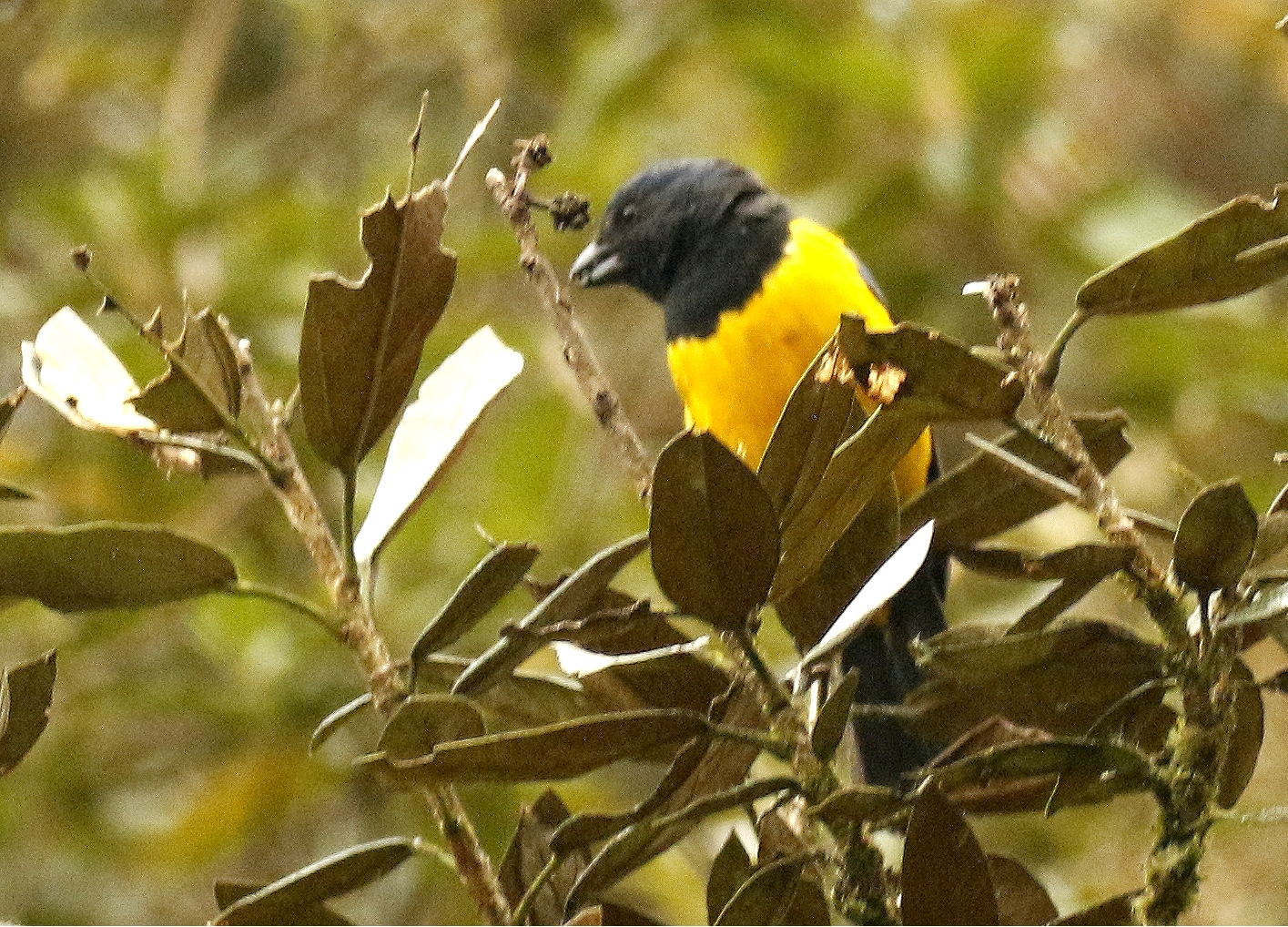
Papallacta Pass – Ecuador

This species was formerly included in the genus Buthraupis. When a molecular phylogenetic study published in 2010 found that Buthraupis was polyphyletic, the black-chested mountain tanager was moved to the resurrected genus Cnemathraupis.
