= San José del Palmar =

- Municipality
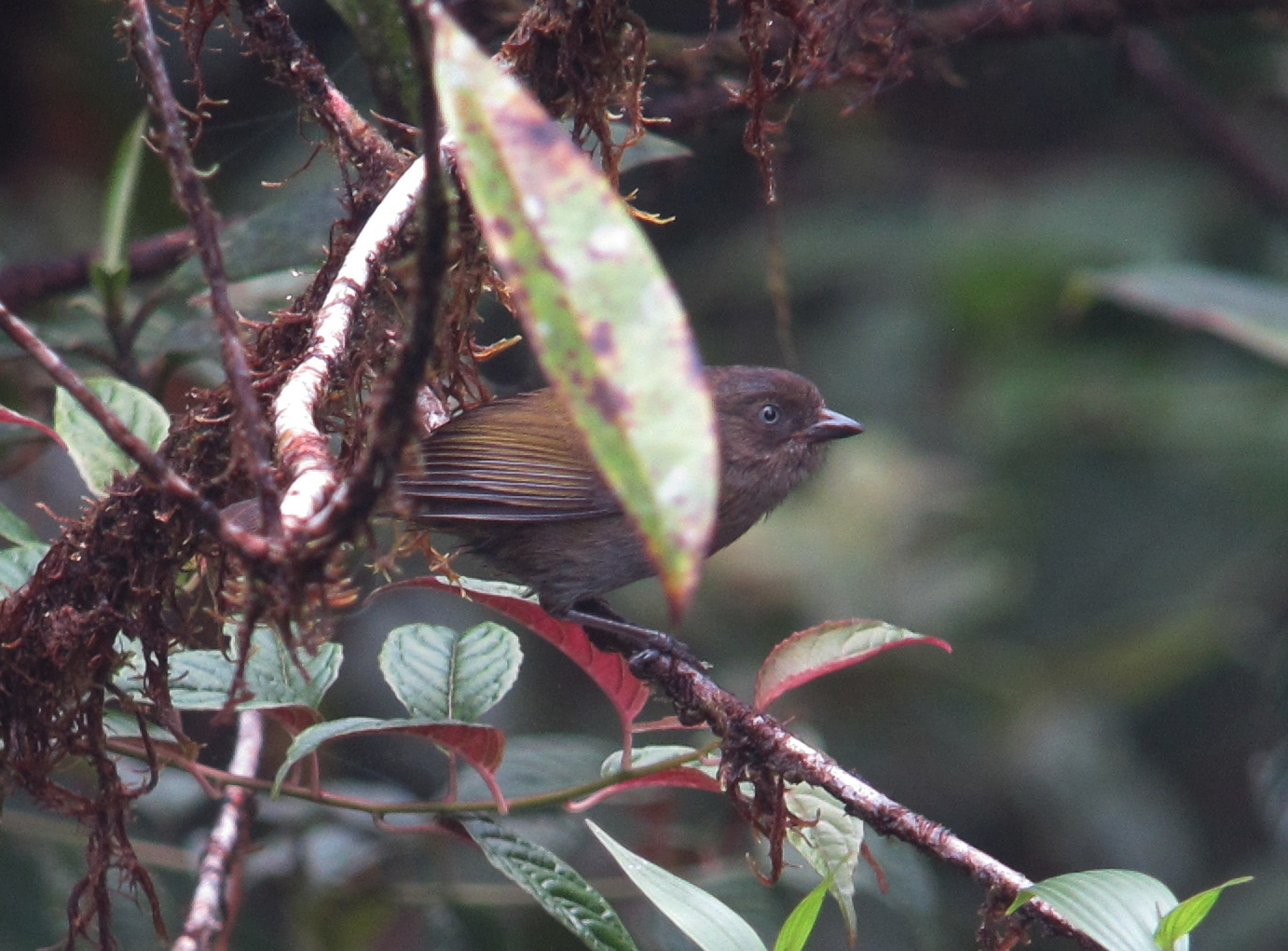

- Location of the municipality and town of San José del Palmar in the Chocó Department of Colombia.

- Location in Colombia
- Country: Colombia
- Department: Chocó Department
- Founded: 19 March 1938

Government
  - Mayor: Leon Fabio Marín Moncada (2016–2019)

Area
  - Municipality: 947 km^{2} (366 sq mi)
- Elevation: 1,288 m (4,226 ft)

Population (2017)
  - Municipality: 4,768
  - Density: 5.03/km^{2} (13.0/sq mi)
  - Urban: 1,132 hab.
- Time zone: UTC-5 (Colombia Standard Time)
- Website: www.sanjosedelpalmar-choco.gov.co

San José del Palmar is a municipality and town in the Chocó Department, Colombia in the central part of the country, 240 km (150 mi) west of the capital Bogotá. San José del Palmar is 1,288 meters (4,226 ft) above sea level and the population is about 4,800.

The terrain around San José del Palmar is mountainous to the east, but to the west it is hilly. The highest point nearby is 1,737 meters (5,699 ft) above sea level, 1 km (0.62 mi) southeast of San José del Palmar. Around San José del Palmar, it is quite densely populated, with 52 inhabitants per square kilometer (130/sq mi). There are no other communities nearby. In the surrounding area, mainly rainforest grows.

== Climate ==
San José del Palmar has a tropical rainforest climate with heavy rainfall and warm to very warm, cloudy weather year-round, although the city's altitude means it is less hot and wet than the lowlands of Chocó Department. The general characteristics of the climate approximately coincide with the middle position of intertropical convergence (equator climate 5°N), a situation which results in a few climatological characteristics: high humidity, abundant rains because of the effect of dynamic thermic convection from air masses, annual distribution of precipitation (bimodal regime) as a function of CIT displacement and thermal variations throughout the year (at the level of average monthly temperatures) almost always lower than 2 °C or 3.6 °F. The above characteristics define the equatorial climate. The municipality presents several levels of altitude with different temperatures and vegetal formations as a function of Holdrige classification.

The distribution of precipitation throughout the year are characterized by a bimodal regime, typical of an equatorial climate, defined by the succession of four rain-periods as follows: two rainy periods and two of less rain. All months of the year exceed 200 mm (7.9 in) of rain, but those of highest rainfall are easily defined as May and October–November, with amounts above 400 mm (16 in). The less-rainy periods are in February and July, with the summer times having lighter rains.

Climate data for San José del Palmar, elevation 1,115 m (3,658 ft), (1981–2010)
Month	Jan	Feb	Mar	Apr	May	Jun	Jul	Aug	Sep	Oct	Nov	Dec	Year
Mean daily maximum °C (°F)	23.6 (74.5)	23.9 (75.0)	24.2 (75.6)	24.6 (76.3)	24.7 (76.5)	24.5 (76.1)	24.5 (76.1)	24.6 (76.3)	24.3 (75.7)	24.1 (75.4)	23.7 (74.7)	23.5 (74.3)	24.2 (75.6)
Daily mean °C (°F)	20.6 (69.1)	20.8 (69.4)	21.0 (69.8)	21.2 (70.2)	21.3 (70.3)	21.2 (70.2)	21.1 (70.0)	21.1 (70.0)	20.8 (69.4)	20.6 (69.1)	20.6 (69.1)	20.6 (69.1)	20.9 (69.6)
Mean daily minimum °C (°F)	18.0 (64.4)	18.1 (64.6)	18.2 (64.8)	18.4 (65.1)	18.4 (65.1)	18.3 (64.9)	18.1 (64.6)	18.0 (64.4)	17.9 (64.2)	17.7 (63.9)	17.8 (64.0)	17.9 (64.2)	18.1 (64.6)
Average precipitation mm (inches)	297.0 (11.69)	275.4 (10.84)	291.0 (11.46)	325.5 (12.81)	354.4 (13.95)	254.8 (10.03)	232.8 (9.17)	255.2 (10.05)	292.8 (11.53)	451.0 (17.76)	505.1 (19.89)	390.2 (15.36)	3,925.3 (154.54)
Average precipitation days	24	22	23	25	26	25	24	23	25	26	27	26	284
Average relative humidity (%)	93	93	92	91	91	91	90	91	91	92	92	93	92
Mean monthly sunshine hours	55.8	48.0	62.0	69.0	89.9	90.0	117.8	111.6	81.0	74.4	72.0	62.0	933.5
Mean daily sunshine hours	1.8	1.7	2.0	2.3	2.9	3.0	3.8	3.6	2.7	2.4	2.4	2.0	2.6
Source: Instituto de Hidrologia Meteorologia y Estudios Ambientales

== History ==
The current territory was populated initially by the indigenous group Embera-chami, who to this day are well-represented in the municipality. The first colonists came from the departments of Antioquia, Caldas, and Valle del Cauca.

The town was founded by Esther Espinosa, Luis Ángel Colorado, Paulino Villegas, Norberto Uribe, Eliseo Flores, Marco Salazar, and Pedro Monsalve in 1938 on the borders of the departments of Risaralda and Valle del Cauca.

It was the epicenter of a M_{w} 7.4 earthquake on 10 August 2026.

== Geography ==
The municipality is situated in the Southeast of Choco, at the borders of the departments of Risaralda and Valle del Cauca. With the municipalities of Itsmina, Tado, Condoto, Novita, Sipi, and Litoral de San Juan, it makes up the Subregion of San Juan. It is equidistant from two of the most important rivers in the state, the San Juan and the Cauca.

With its bordering regions, it shares two ecosystems of great importance, the National Park of Tatama and the Serrania of Los Paraguas. The head of the municipality is situated at an altitude of 1,100 meters at 4° and 54’ northern latitude and 76° 15’ west longitude of the Greenwich Meridian and at a distance from de Santafé de Bogotá of 2° 03’ and 34” to the west of the country. The approximate extension of the township is 947 km², which is equivalent to a sixth of the municipality of Quidobo and almost the same as that of the municipalities of El Carmen de Atrato and Nóvita. The municipality is bordered to the north by the municipality of Condoto, to the south by the municipalities of Sipi and Novita, and to the east by the departments of Risaralda and Valle del Cauca, and to the west by the municipality of Novita.

The municipality includes the locality of El Sinai.

=== Ecosystems ===
The northeast part of the territory of San Jose del Palmar is in the jurisdiction of the Tatama Park. At the boundaries of the department of the valley is the Serrania of the Paraguas where the cloud forests of the Galapagos and the Torra hills. In the foggy mountains of the Galapagos, there are many bromeliads, "platanillos" like Canna indica and Heliconia collinsiana, mountain grapes, laurels, bamboo, different species of palms, "trompeteros," and Colombian pine. The two last species only currently exist in the north of South America.

They are also the habitat of the spectacled bear, the Colombian opossum, and deer. In the Torra hill region, there are also spectacled bears, white-throated hummingbirds and Colombian weasels. There is also a wide variety of flowers like orchids and bromeliads. Moreover, there is a wide area of virgin jungle. These two zones, along with the National Natural Park of Tatama, make up a very important ecological corridor that connects the Pacific with the Andes.

=== Terrain ===
San José del Palmar is a mountainous territory, marked by a succession of elevations belonging to the Western Range that forms a large number of canyons and a few wide and deep valleys.

The average incline is 35%, wavy and broken in the Rio Negro and Playa Rica sectors, especially in the Bear Heights and the Patios, and very broken in areas like Las Amarillas, Zabaleta and Galápagos. The lowest areas are near the Tamana river basin. The principal heights of the municipality are: to the north, the Tamana hills, with 4,200 m (13,800 ft) of elevation, and the Tatama, with 3,950 m (12,960 ft), and near the southwest of the Torra, with 3,670 m (12,040 ft), which are part of the Paraguas range. On the borders of the Valle department are the foothills of the Galapagos that reach a height of almost 3,000 m (9,800 ft).

== Economy ==
With respect to potential uses, an estimated 8,700 hectares (21,000 acres) of the soils are suited for extensive agriculture, and 5,270 hectares (13,000 acres) for intensive agriculture in plateaus and small valleys around rivers, and some more for selective crops like coffee, citrus, and plantains. The soils of the municipality belong, mostly, still, in large part, to the Pacific Forest Reserve with certain subtractions for colonization and indigenous reserves, which are still in process of adjudication. An approximate 85% of the soil is currently being used.

Currently, 6,200 hectares (15,000 acres) are dedicated to pasture and 2,447 hectares (6,050 acres) are under cultivation for cocoa, plantains, sugar cane, fruits, corn, and yucca, which correspond to 4% of land dedicated to agriculture and 4.5% to pastures and the last 8% to cane stubble. 90% of cultivated soil has degradation problems to some extent. The principal problems that affect the resources are associated with productive activities from the municipalities.

The expansion of agricultural exploitation and logging into designated forest zones contribute significantly to the acceleration of erosion processes, generating grave problems with mudslides that put inhabitants at risk. Even in natural conditions, the soils are exposed to erosive processes by their own properties like the high rainfall and the rocky substrate that support them. This situation is made worse by the lack of vegetal cover that typically cushions the high rainfall and loss of soil, which causes mass rockfalls.

== Population ==
In the municipality of San Jose of Palmar, the population is mixed: the first inhabitants were indigenous people from the Chamies group; before the colonization process that gave rise to its foundation, there were already people at the banks of the Ingara fiver, in the region of Valencia, Black populations in the San Juan river basin, and after that the colonizers who settled in the territory from other parts of the country, principally from the departments of Antioquia, Valle del Cauca, old Caldas, and Tolia. From these groups of populators, the indigenous group has the lowest presence in the current day, fundamentally because of the alteration of their lifeways because of the pressure of the same process of population. In the paths of Copeg, Suramita, and Rio Blanco, the few aboriginal descendants of the natives of the municipality are located.

Other ethnic groups live in the territory and constitute the majority of the current population. The difficult conditions of life which confront the inhabitants of the municipality, because of the lack of activities which generate economic resources, have resulted in the result that, in the last most recent decades, there has been a decrease in the population settled in the rural area, which in the first instance, have been migrating to the municipal seat, and afterwards, abandon the municipality entirely.

Distribution by gender
Gender	%
Men	51.57%
Women	48.43%
