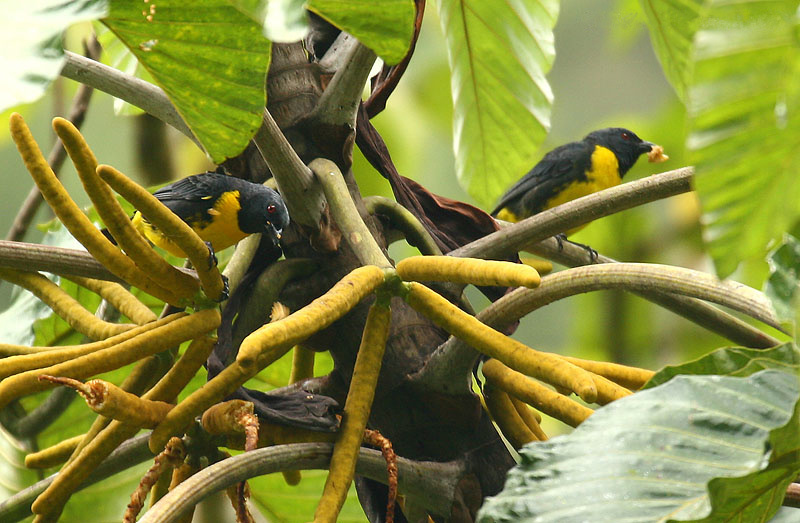

Conservation status
- Near Threatened (IUCN 3.1)

Scientific classification
- Kingdom: Animalia
- Phylum: Chordata
- Class: Aves
- Order: Passeriformes
- Family: Thraupidae
- Genus: Bangsia
- Species: B. arcaei

Binomial name
- Bangsia arcaei (Sclater, PL & Salvin, 1869)

= Blue-and-gold tanager =

Species of bird

The blue-and-gold tanager (Bangsia arcaei) is a species of bird in the family Thraupidae. It is native to the Talamancan montane forests and the Serranía del Darién. It is threatened by habitat loss.
