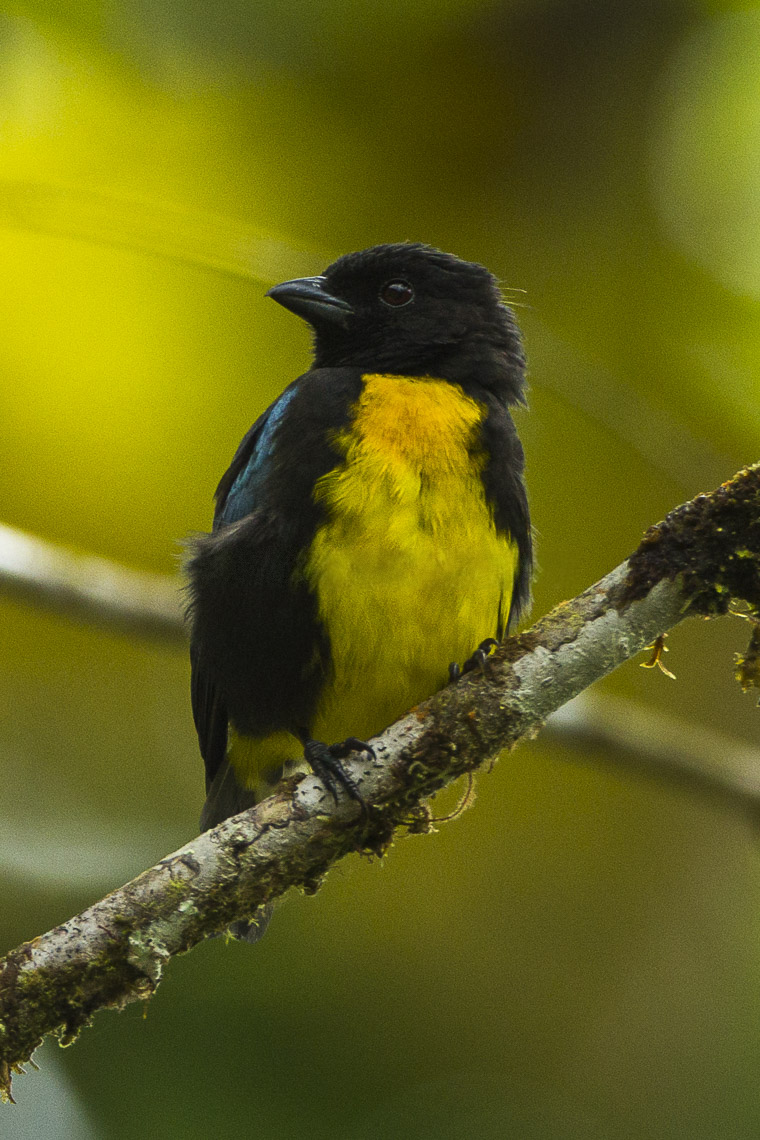

Conservation status
- Least Concern (IUCN 3.1)

Scientific classification
- Kingdom: Animalia
- Phylum: Chordata
- Class: Aves
- Order: Passeriformes
- Family: Thraupidae
- Genus: Bangsia
- Species: B. melanochlamys

Binomial name
- Bangsia melanochlamys (Hellmayr, 1910)

= Black-and-gold tanager =

Species of bird

The black-and-gold tanager (Bangsia melanochlamys) is a species of bird in the family Thraupidae, which is endemic to Colombia.

Its natural habitat is subtropical or tropical moist montane forests. It is threatened by habitat loss.
