= El Cairo =

- Municipality and town
- Flag

- Location of the municipality and town of El Cairo in the Valle del Cauca Department of Colombia.

- Location in Colombia
- Coordinates: 4°45′N 76°15′W
- Country: Colombia
- Department: Valle del Cauca Department

Area
  - Total: 283 km^{2} (109 sq mi)

Population (2015)
  - Total: 9,976
  - Density: 35.3/km^{2} (91.3/sq mi)
- Time zone: UTC-5 (Colombia Standard Time)

El Cairo is a town and municipality located in the Department of Valle del Cauca, Colombia.

== Climate ==
Climate data for Alban, El Cairo, elevation 1,400 m (4,600 ft), (1971–2000)
| Month | Jan | Feb | Mar | Apr | May | Jun | Jul | Aug | Sep | Oct | Nov | Dec | Year |
|---|---|---|---|---|---|---|---|---|---|---|---|---|---|
| Mean daily maximum °C (°F) | 24.6 (76.3) | 24.8 (76.6) | 25.1 (77.2) | 25.1 (77.2) | 25.2 (77.4) | 25.4 (77.7) | 25.7 (78.3) | 25.6 (78.1) | 24.9 (76.8) | 24.4 (75.9) | 24.2 (75.6) | 24.4 (75.9) | 24.9 (76.8) |
| Daily mean °C (°F) | 19.5 (67.1) | 19.6 (67.3) | 19.8 (67.6) | 19.9 (67.8) | 19.9 (67.8) | 19.9 (67.8) | 19.7 (67.5) | 19.7 (67.5) | 19.3 (66.7) | 19.0 (66.2) | 19.1 (66.4) | 19.3 (66.7) | 19.5 (67.1) |
| Mean daily minimum °C (°F) | 15.5 (59.9) | 15.6 (60.1) | 15.7 (60.3) | 15.9 (60.6) | 15.9 (60.6) | 15.6 (60.1) | 15.0 (59.0) | 15.1 (59.2) | 15.1 (59.2) | 15.2 (59.4) | 15.5 (59.9) | 15.6 (60.1) | 15.4 (59.7) |
| Average precipitation mm (inches) | 74.8 (2.94) | 80.9 (3.19) | 91.3 (3.59) | 148.8 (5.86) | 140.6 (5.54) | 109.1 (4.30) | 72.7 (2.86) | 100.4 (3.95) | 129.8 (5.11) | 188.9 (7.44) | 170.2 (6.70) | 106.6 (4.20) | 1,414.2 (55.68) |
| Average precipitation days | 14 | 14 | 15 | 21 | 21 | 17 | 14 | 16 | 19 | 23 | 22 | 17 | 214 |
| Average relative humidity (%) | 80 | 80 | 80 | 81 | 81 | 79 | 78 | 78 | 80 | 82 | 82 | 81 | 80 |
| Mean monthly sunshine hours | 117.8 | 104.6 | 117.8 | 108.0 | 117.8 | 129.0 | 158.1 | 145.7 | 123.0 | 102.3 | 102.0 | 102.3 | 1,428.4 |
| Mean daily sunshine hours | 3.8 | 3.7 | 3.8 | 3.6 | 3.8 | 4.3 | 5.1 | 4.7 | 4.1 | 3.3 | 3.4 | 3.3 | 3.9 |
Source: Instituto de Hidrologia Meteorologia y Estudios Ambientales
