= El Sinai =

- Vereda
- Location in Chocó and Colombia El Sinai (Colombia)
- Coordinates: 4°50′3.6″N 76°12′25.0″W
- Country: Colombia
- Department: Chocó
- Municipality: San José del Palmar Municipality
- Elevation: 6,140 ft (1,870 m)
- Time zone: UTC-5 (Colombia Standard Time)

El Sinai is a vereda in San José del Palmar Municipality, Chocó Department in Colombia.

== Climate ==
El Sinai has a subtropical highland climate (Köppen Cfb) with very heavy rainfall, warm afternoons and pleasant mornings year-round.

Climate data for El Sinai
Month	Jan	Feb	Mar	Apr	May	Jun	Jul	Aug	Sep	Oct	Nov	Dec	Year
Mean daily maximum °C (°F)	19.8 (67.6)	20.1 (68.2)	20.4 (68.7)	20.8 (69.4)	20.9 (69.6)	20.7 (69.3)	20.7 (69.3)	20.8 (69.4)	20.5 (68.9)	20.3 (68.5)	19.9 (67.8)	19.7 (67.5)	20.4 (68.7)
Daily mean °C (°F)	16.8 (62.2)	17.0 (62.6)	17.2 (63.0)	17.4 (63.3)	17.5 (63.5)	17.4 (63.3)	17.3 (63.1)	17.3 (63.1)	17.0 (62.6)	16.8 (62.2)	16.8 (62.2)	16.8 (62.2)	17.1 (62.8)
Mean daily minimum °C (°F)	14.2 (57.6)	14.3 (57.7)	14.4 (57.9)	14.6 (58.3)	14.6 (58.3)	14.5 (58.1)	14.3 (57.7)	14.2 (57.6)	14.1 (57.4)	13.9 (57.0)	14.0 (57.2)	14.1 (57.4)	14.3 (57.7)
Average rainfall mm (inches)	441.7 (17.39)	373.6 (14.71)	375.9 (14.80)	459.0 (18.07)	479.0 (18.86)	358.9 (14.13)	356.7 (14.04)	369.8 (14.56)	402.7 (15.85)	559.2 (22.02)	688.6 (27.11)	556.1 (21.89)	5,421.2 (213.43)
Average rainy days	25	22	24	26	26	24	23	23	25	28	27	26	299
