= Thomas E. Penard =

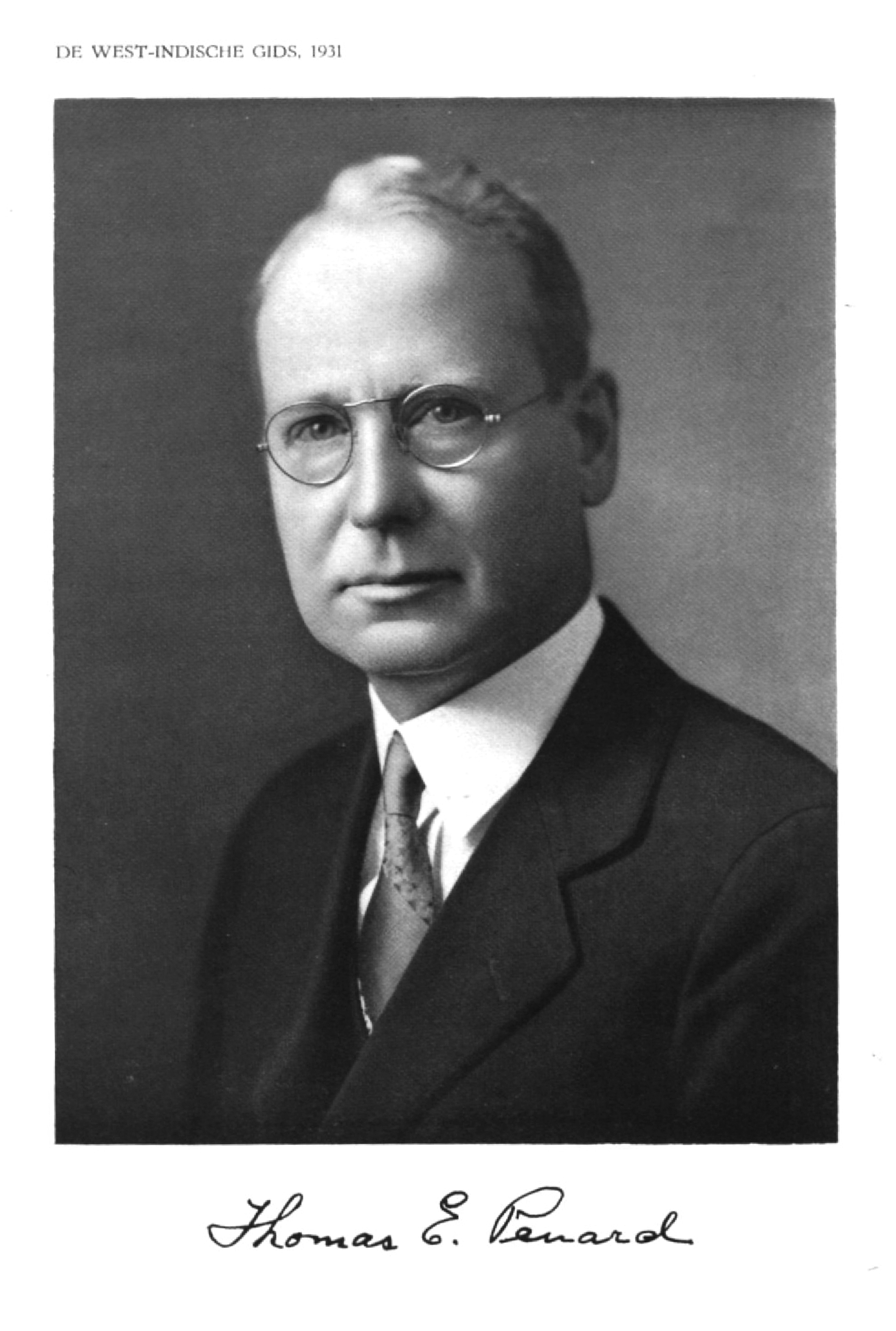
Penard, c. 1931

Thomas Edward Penard (7 May 1878 – 27 October 1936) was an American engineer and ornithologist who, along with his brothers studied the birds of Surinam. Along with his brothers, he also took an interest in folklore and linguistics in the Caribbean.

Penard was the second child of Dutch merchant Frederik and Philippina Salomons, then settled in Paramaribo, Surinam, a Dutch colony. His older brother Frederik Paul (26 January 1876 – 4 September 1909) and a younger brother Arthur Philip (6 April 1880 – 12 September 1932) who were affected by leprosy from a young age were forced out of school and educated at home. To avoid infection, Thomas and the youngest son William were sent off to the United States of America at the age of thirteen and grew up in Everett, Massachusetts. He graduated from the Massachusetts Institute of Technology with a degree in electrical engineering in 1900 and joined the Edison Electric Illuminating Company in Boston. He later helped establish evening education at the Northeastern University, Boston where he also taught.

Frederik and Arthur who stayed on at home were well known for their ornithological work which they began in 1896, with collections made for them by natives and deposited at their home in Waterkant. The collections and information collation resulted finally in the publication of De Vogels van Guyana (in two volumes published 1908 and 1910). A part of the Surinam collections was sold off to Lord Rothschild and it was used to fund the publication of the first volume. It was their mother who handled correspondence and it was through her that support for the second volume of their book came from the Leiden Museum. They also interacted with Philip Lutley Sclater. Thomas also took an interest in birds from 1918 and his brother Arthur helped him with a collection of nearly 2000 bird skins between 1912 and 1914 which were held by Thomas in Arlington. Thomas collaborated with Outram Bangs to study the birds of Surinam and published several notes. Frederik died before the second volume was made and Arthur later went blind but continued to have notes dictated. Unable in later life to spare enough time from engineering work, Thomas sold off his collections of birds to the Museum of Comparative Zoology in 1930.

Penard married Sabrina Grant in 1905 and they had a son. The subspecies Jacamerops aureus penardi was named in his honour by Bangs.

== Publications ==
- Penard, Thomas E. (1918). "Starlings (Sturnus vulgaris) at Barnstable, Mass". The Auk. 35 (1): 80–81. doi:10.2307/4072390. JSTOR 4072390.
- Penard, Thomas E.; Bangs, Outram (1918). "Notes on a collection of Surinam birds". Bulletin of the Museum of Comparative Zoology at Harvard College. 62: 25–93.
- Penard, Thomas E. (1919). "Remarks on Beebe's "Tropical Wild Life"". The Auk. 36 (2): 217–225. doi:10.2307/4073040. JSTOR 4073040.
- Penard, Thomas E.; Bangs, Outram (1918). "Some critical notes on birds". Bulletin of the Museum of Comparative Zoology at Harvard College. 63: 21–44.
- Penard, Thomas E. (1919). "Revision of the genus Buthraupis Cabanis". The Auk. 36 (4): 536–540. doi:10.2307/4073348. JSTOR 4073348.
- Penard, Thomas E. (1919). "Sarkidiornis sylvicola in British Guiana". The Auk. 36 (4): 564. doi:10.2307/4073358. JSTOR 4073358.
- Penard, Thomas E. (1919). "The name of the Black Cuckoo". The Auk. 86: 569–570.
- Penard, Thomas E. (1919). "Some untenable names in ornithology". Proceedings of the New England Zoölogical Club. 7: 21–22.
- Penard, Thomas E.; Bangs, Outram (1919). "The name of the Common Jungle Fowl". Proceedings of the New England Zoölogical Club. 7: 23–25.
- Penard, Thomas E. (1919). "Two new birds from Roraima". Proceedings of the New England Zoölogical Club. 7: 29–31.
- Penard, Thomas E.; Bangs (1920). "The proper name of the West African Serin". The Auk. 37 (2): 300–301. doi:10.2307/4072735. JSTOR 4072735.
- Penard, Thomas E.; Bangs, Outram (1921). "Notes on some American birds, chiefly Neotropical". Bulletin of the Museum of Comparative Zoology at Harvard College. 64: 365–397.
- Penard, Thomas E.; Bangs, Outram (1921). "A new name for Pachyramphus polychoptera costaricensis Chubb". Proceedings of the Biological Society of Washington. 34: 78.
- Penard, Thomas E. (1921). "Descriptions of six new subspecies of American birds". Proceedings of the Biological Society of Washington. 34: 89–92.
- Penard, Thomas E.; Bangs, Outram (1921). "The name of the Eastern Hermit Thrush". The Auk. 88: 432–434.
- Penard, Thomas E.; Bangs, Outram (1922). "A new form of Edolius forficatus (Lino)". Proceedings of the New England Zoölogical Club. 8: 25–26.
- Penard, Thomas E. (1922). "A new hummingbird from Surinam". Proceedings of the New England Zoölogical Club. 8: 27–28.
- Penard, Thomas E.; Bangs, Outram (1922). "The northern form of Leptotila fulviventris Lawrence". Proceedings of the New England Zoölogical Club. 8: 29–30.
- Penard, Thomas E.; Bangs, Outram (1922). "The identity of Attila flammulatus Lafresnaye". Proceedings of the Biological Society of Washington. 35: 223–224.
- Penard, Thomas E.; Bangs, Outram (1922). "The type of Pachyramphus polychopteras (Vieillot)". Proceedings of the Biological Society of Washington. 35: 225.
- Penard, Thomas E.; Bangs, Outram (1922). "A new name for the Rufous-chested Flycatcher". Proceedings of the Biological Society of Washington. 35: 225.
- Penard, Thomas E.; Bangs, Outram (1922). "The identity of Hylophilus leucophrys Lafresnaye". Proceedings of the Biological Society of Washington. 35: 226.
- Penard, Thomas E. (1923). "Two new forms of Surinam birds". Proceedings of the New England Zoölogical Club. 8: 35–36.
- Penard, Thomas E.; Bangs, Outram (1923). "A new bulbul from Fukien, China". Proceedings of the New England Zoölogical Club. 8: 41–42.
- Penard, Thomas E.; Bangs, Outram (1923). "A new Merops from Java". Proceedings of the New England Zoölogical Club. 8: 43.
- Penard, Thomas E. (1923). "Status of Spermephila schistacea Lawrence". Proceedings of the Biological Society of Washington. 8. The Biological Society of Washington: 59–62.
- Penard, Thomas E. (1923). "A new flycatcher from Surinam". Proceedings of the Biological Society of Washington. 8: 63–64.
- Penard, Thomas E. (1923). "The identity of Gmelin's Todus plumbeus". The Auk. 40 (2): 334–335. doi:10.2307/4073844. JSTOR 4073844.
- Penard, Thomas E. (1923). "A new tanager from Surinam". Occasional Papers of the Boston Society of Natural History. 6: 63.
- Penard, Thomas E.; Bangs, Outram (1924). "The identity of Trochilus ruckeri". Occasional Papers of the Boston Society of Natural History. 6: 77–78.
- Penard, Thomas E. (1924). "Nesting of Great Blue Heron in Boothbay, Maine". The Auk. 42. American Ornithologists' Union: 128.
- Penard, Thomas E.; Bangs, Outram (1925). "A new Blue Water-Thrush from China". Occasional Papers of the Boston Society of Natural History. 5. The Boston Society of Natural History: 147.
- Penard, Thomas E.; Bangs, Outram (1925). "The Henry Bryant types of birds". Bulletin of the Museum of Comparative Zoology at Harvard College. 67: 197–207.
- Penard, Thomas E. (1926). "Warblers at sea". The Auk. 43 (3): 376–377. doi:10.2307/4075451. JSTOR 4075451.
- Penard, Thomas E.; Penard, Arthur P. (1926). "Birdcatching in Surinam". De West-Indische Gids. 7: 545–566. doi:10.1163/22134360-90001504.
- Penard, Thomas E. (1927). "The Duck Hawk in Guiana". The Auk. 44 (3): 419–420. doi:10.2307/4074701. JSTOR 4074701.
- Penard, Thomas E. (1927). "Warblers at sea". The Auk. 44: 420–421.
- Penard, Thomas E. (1927). "The Yellow Warbler (Dendroica aestiva aestiva) in Dutch Guiana". The Auk. 44 (3): 425–426. doi:10.2307/4074710. JSTOR 4074710.
- Penard, Thomas E. (1924). "Historical sketch of the ornithology of Surinam". De West-Indische Gids. 6: 1–24. JSTOR 41847659.
