= Outram Bangs =

American zoologist

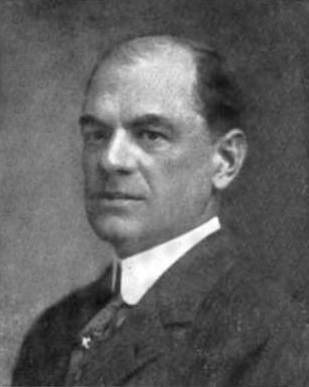
- Born: January 12, 1863; Watertown, Massachusetts
- Died: September 22, 1932 (aged 69); Wareham, Massachusetts
- Education: Harvard
- Known for: Collection of birds and mammals
- Parents: Edward Bangs (father); Annie Outram (Hodgkinson) Bangs (mother)
- Scientific career
- Fields: Zoology
- Workplaces: Harvard
- Author abbrev. (zoology): Bangs

Outram Bangs (January 12, 1863 – September 22, 1932) was an American zoologist.

== Biography ==
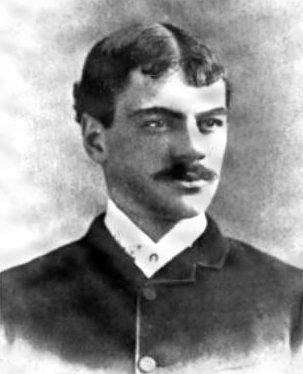
As a Harvard undergraduate

Bangs was born in Watertown, Massachusetts, as the second son of Edward and Annie Outram (Hodgkinson) Bangs. He studied at Harvard from 1880 to 1884, and became Curator of Mammals at the Harvard Museum of Comparative Zoology in 1900.

He visited Jamaica in 1906 and collected over 100 birds there, but his trip was cut short by dengue fever. His collection of over 10,000 mammalian skins and skulls, including over 100 type specimens, was presented to Harvard College in 1899. In 1908 his collection of over 24,000 bird skins was presented to the Museum of Comparative Zoology, and he went on to increase it. In 1925 he went to Europe, visiting museums and ornithologists and arranging scientific exchanges. He wrote over 70 books and articles, 55 of them on mammals ...

He died at his summer home at Wareham, Massachusetts.

== Works ==
- "The Florida Deer", Proceedings of the Biological Society of Washington 10:25–28 (1896)
- The hummingbirds of the Santa Marta Region of Colombia American Ornithologists' Union, New York (1899)
- "The Florida Puma", Proceedings of the Biological Society of Washington 13:15–17. (1899)
- "The Mammals and Birds of the Pearl Islands, Bay of Panama", Harvard University Museum of Comparative Zoology, Bulletin 46 (8) : 137–160 (1905) with John Eliot Thayer
- "Notes on the Birds and Mammals of the Arctic Coast of East Siberia", New England Zoological Club, Proceedings, 5 : 1–66 (1914) with Glover Morrill Allen and J. E. Thayer
- "A Collection of Birds from the Cayman Islands", Harvard University Museum of Comparative Zoology, Bulletin 60:301–320 (1916)

== Associated eponyms ==
- Bangsia – Tanager genus
- Grallaria bangsi – Santa Marta antpitta
- Syntheosciurus brochus – Bangs's mountain squirrel
