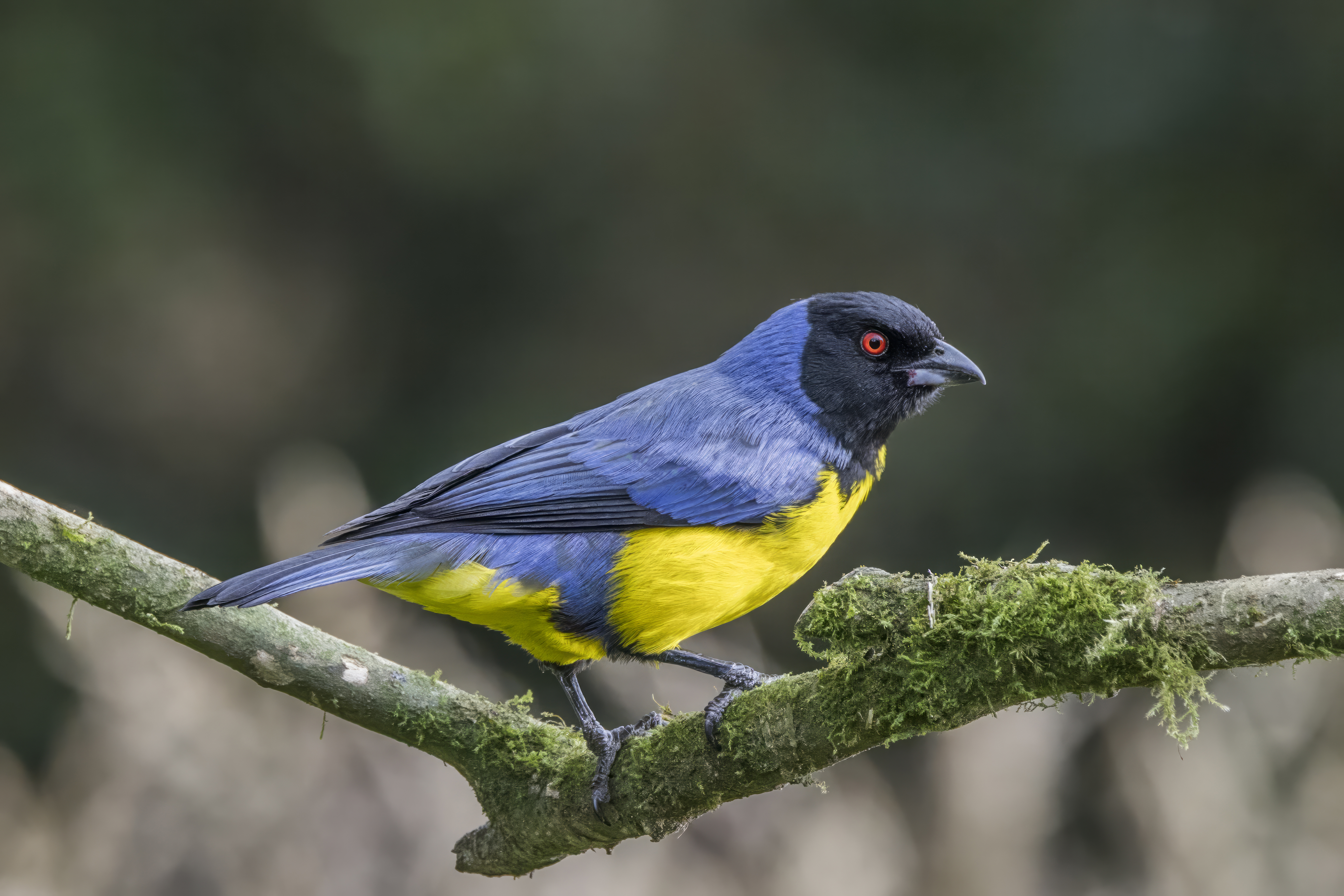
- Buthraupis montana cucullata, Colombia

Conservation status
- Least Concern (IUCN 3.1)

Scientific classification
- Kingdom: Animalia
- Phylum: Chordata
- Class: Aves
- Order: Passeriformes
- Family: Thraupidae
- Genus: Buthraupis; Cabanis, 1851
- Species: B. montana

Binomial name
- Buthraupis montana (d'Orbigny & Lafresnaye, 1837)
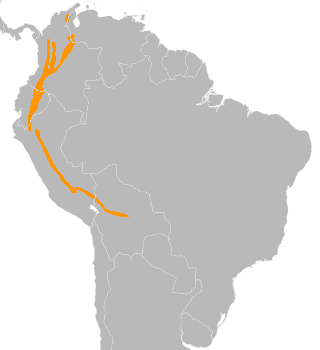
- Hooded mountain tanager range map

= Hooded mountain tanager =

Species of bird

The hooded mountain tanager (Buthraupis montana) is a species of bird in the tanager family Thraupidae. It is the only member of the genus Buthraupis. It is found in the forests and woodlands of the Andean highlands of Bolivia, Colombia, Ecuador, Peru, and Venezuela, at altitudes between 1,800 and 3,000 m (5,900 and 9,800 ft). At 23 centimetres (9.1 in) and 96 grams (3.4 oz), it is one of the largest tanagers. It has a black head and thighs, a blue back and bright yellow belly, with red eyes.

== Taxonomy ==
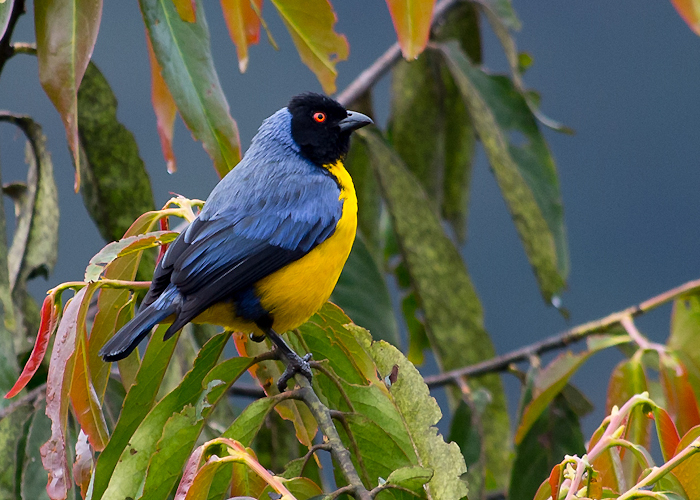
In Peru

The hooded mountain tanager was formally described in 1837 by the French naturalists Alcide d'Orbigny and Frédéric de Lafresnaye from a specimen collected in the Bolivian Yungas. They coined the binomial name Aglaia montana. It is now the only species placed in the genus Buthraupis that was introduced in 1851 by the German ornithologist Jean Cabanis. The genus name combines the Ancient Greek bou- meaning "huge" and thraupis, an unknown small bird but used by ornithologists to signify a tanager. The specific name is from the Latin montanus meaning "of the mountains".

Six subspecies are recognised:

- Buthraupis montana venezuelana Aveledo & Perez, 1989 – northwest Venezuela
- Buthraupis montana gigas (Bonaparte, 1851) – north Colombia
- Buthraupis montana cucullata (Jardine & Selby, 1842) – west, central Colombia to Ecuador
- Buthraupis montana cyanonota Berlepsch & Stolzmann, 1896 – north, central Peru
- Buthraupis montana saturata Berlepsch & Stolzmann, 1906 – southeast Peru
- Buthraupis montana montana (d'Orbigny & Lafresnaye, 1837) – west Bolivia
