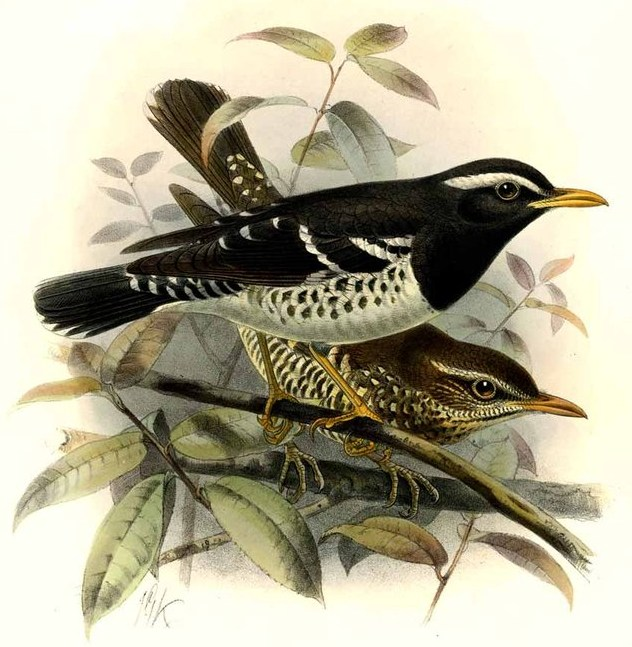
- Illustration by John Gerrard Keulemans

Conservation status
- Least Concern (IUCN 3.1)

Scientific classification
- Kingdom: Animalia
- Phylum: Chordata
- Class: Aves
- Order: Passeriformes
- Family: Turdidae
- Genus: Geokichla
- Species: G. wardii

Binomial name
- Geokichla wardii (Blyth, 1843)

Synonyms
- Zoothera wardii Turdulus wardii Turdus wardii protonym

Audio
- Calls

= Pied thrush =

Species of bird

The pied thrush (Geokichla wardii) is a member of the thrush family found in India and Sri Lanka. The males are conspicuously patterned in black and white while the females are olive brown and speckled. They breed in the central Himalayan forests and winter in the hill forests of southern India and Sri Lanka. Like many other thrushes, they forage on leaf litter below forest undergrowth and fly into trees when disturbed and sit still making them difficult to locate.

== Description ==
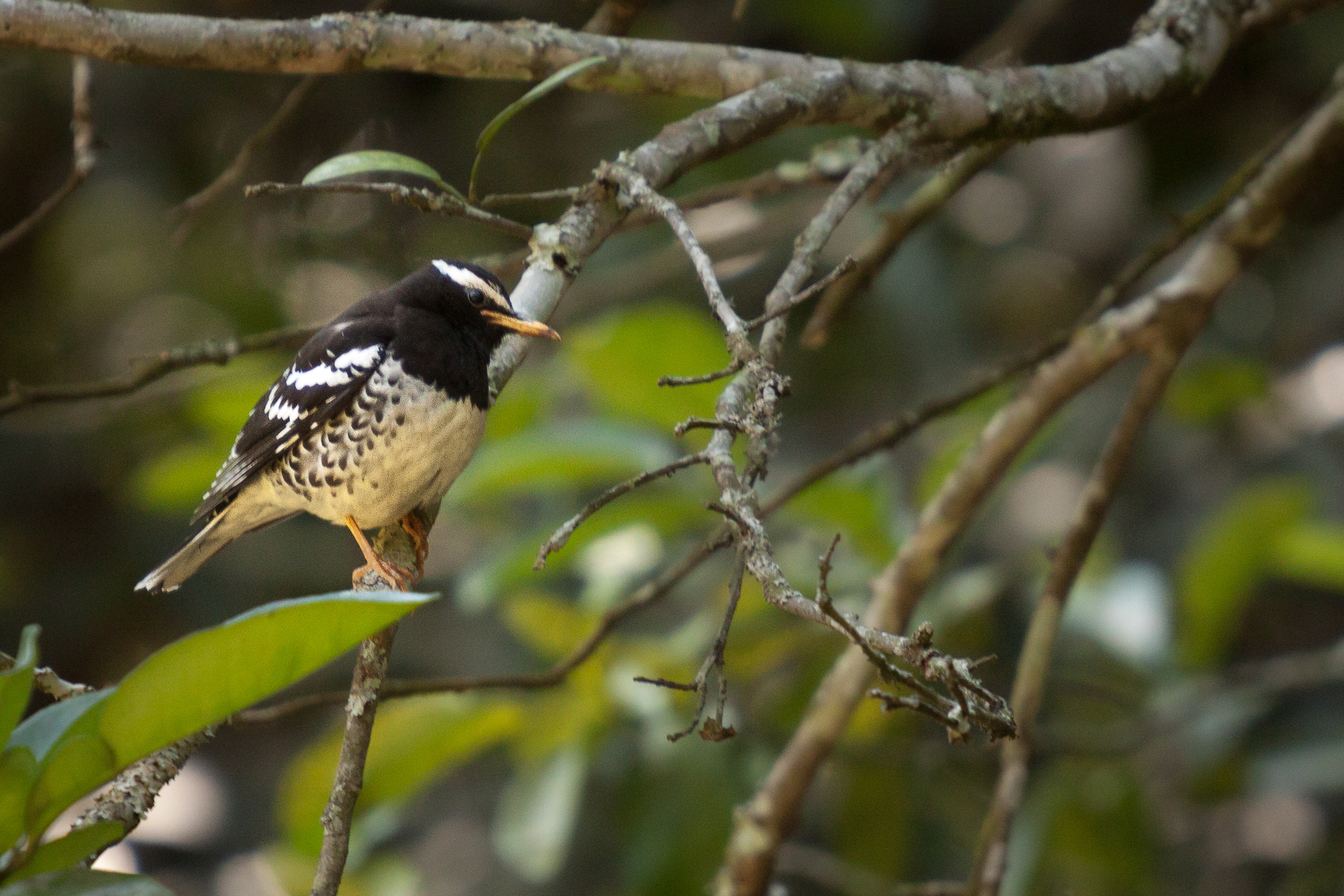
Male wintering in Karnataka, India

Males of this 22 cm (8.7 in) thrush are conspicuously black and white. Mostly black on the upper parts it has a long white supercilium, and white tips to the wing coverts, tertials, rump and tail. The underparts are white with black flank spots the bill and legs are yellow. Females and young birds have the same basic pattern, but the black is replaced by dark brown, and the white by light brown. The markings on the underside are scalier. The third primary is the longest followed by the fourth with the second and fifth being nearly equal in length. The first primary is reduced.

The bill is not as strongly curved as that of the dark-sided thrush or the long-billed thrush and the female lacks the prominent pale cheek spot of the similar looking female Siberian thrush.

The binomial commemorates Samuel Neville Ward (1813–1897), a British colonial administrator in India from 1832 to 1863. Jerdon and Charles Darwin corresponded with S.N. Ward who worked in the Madras Civil Service, posted for sometime at Sirsi and was known for his natural history studies and artistic talent.

Thomas C. Jerdon who first obtained a specimen of the species from Ward notes:

This Pied Blackbird is spread, but very sparingly, through the Himalayas, and during the winter in the plains of India. I first procured it, through Mr. Ward, from the foot of the Neilgherries, and afterwards obtained two specimens at Nellore in the Carnatic.

The species was variously placed in the past and for a long time in the genus Zoothera along with many other thrushes but molecular phylogenetic studies in 2008 clarified the phylogeny and the requirements for monophyly of the genera led to the older genus Geokichla being resurrected. The genus Zoothera now contains species that are not strongly sexually dimorphic unlike Geokichla. The pied thrush's closest relative is the Siberian thrush Geokichla sibirica.

== Distribution ==
- Asian
  - G. sibirica
  - - - G. wardii
      - - African
          - - G. cameronensis
            - G. princei
          - - G. gurneyi
            - - - G. crossleyi
                - G. oberlaenderi
              - - G. piaggiae
                - G. tanganjicae
        - - African
            G. guttata
          - Asian
            - G. spiloptera
            - - G. citrina
              - - G. cinerea
                - - G. erythronota
                  - - G. schistacea
                    - - G. peronii
                      - - G. dohertyi
                        - G. interpres

Relationship with congeneric thrushes

The summer breeding range is from western Himachal Pradesh in the Himalayas east at least until central Nepal. Records from further east such as Sikkim have been questioned by Rasmussen and Anderton (2005). The pied thrush is migratory, wintering mainly in Sri Lanka, with smaller numbers in the hills of south India. During passage, they may be preyed on by crows.

Although rare, they are locally and seasonally seen regularly at certain locations in winter such as at Victoria Park in Nuwara Eliya, Sri Lanka, where a number of birds gather by the stream early in the morning or in some hills stations in southern India such as Nandi Hills and Yercaud.

== Behaviour and ecology ==
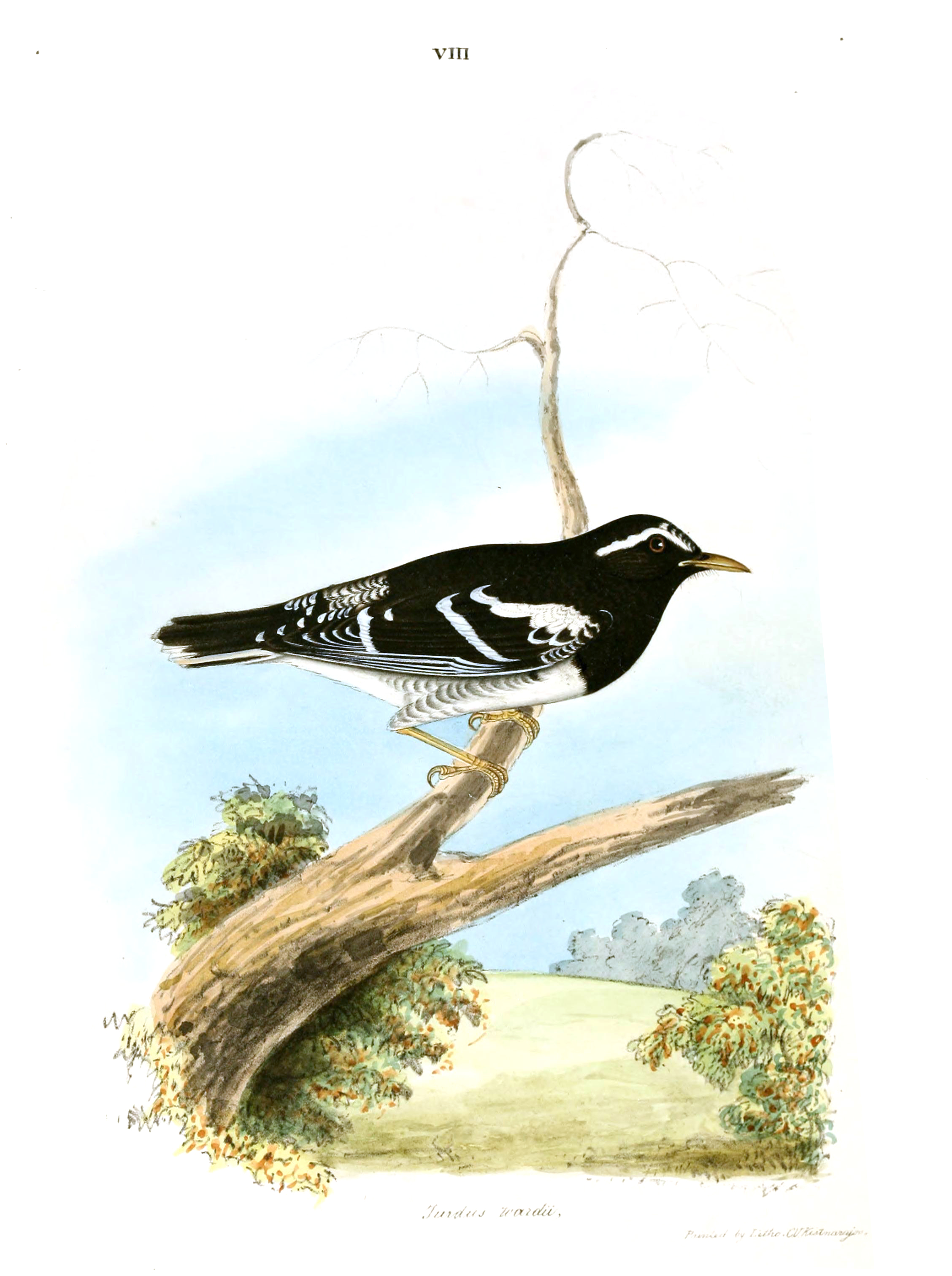
The species was first noted by Jerdon but described by Edward Blyth. This image is from Jerdon's 1843-47 Illustrations of Indian Ornithology and was lithographed by C.V. Kistnarajoo based on an illustration by S. N. Ward of the Madras Civil Service, the background foliage was added by Captain S. Best of the Madras Engineers.

They forage alone or in pairs, often seen on the ground but flying into the trees and perching still when disturbed. The pied thrush, like many Zoothera thrushes, can be quite secretive. Pied thrushes are omnivorous, but eat more insects than fruit. They form loose flocks in winter.

The breeding season is May to July and the nest is a deep cup lined with grass and cemented with mud and placed in a low tree fork. The clutch consists of 3–4 white or bluish eggs. This uncommon species breeds in the Himalayas between 1,500 and 2,500 m (4,900 and 8,200 ft) in thick woodland. The wintering areas are similar but include less well-wooded areas, and are generally at 750 to 1,500 m (2,460 to 4,920 ft) altitude.

Their song is not considered as musical as those of many others thrushes and consists of a series of squeaky notes followed by short trills.
