= Moluccan thrush =

The Moluccan thrush has been split into two species:

- Buru thrush (Zoothera dumasi)
- Seram thrush (Zoothera joiceyi)
