= Grey thrush =

The name grey thrush can refer to several species of bird:

- Japanese thrush (Turdus cardis) of eastern Asia
- Grey ground-thrush (Zoothera princei) of Africa
- Grey shrike-thrush (Colluricincla harmonica) of Australasia
