= Mauritius ground thrush =

Mauritius ground thrush Temporal range: Holocene

Conservation status
- Extinct (possibly before 1598) (IUCN 3.1)

Scientific classification
- Kingdom: Animalia
- Phylum: Chordata
- Class: Aves
- Order: Passeriformes
- Family: Turdidae
- Genus: Geokichla
- Species: †G. longitarsus

Binomial name
- †Geokichla longitarsus Hume, 2022

Extinct species of thrush bird from Mauritius

The Mauritius ground thrush (Geokichla longitarsus) is an extinct species of long-legged thrush within the Turdidae family. Endemic to Mauritius, it probably went extinct during the 14th–16th centuries.

== Description ==
The Mauritius ground thrush is based on the holotype (MNHN MAD7127, MNHN MAD 7172 and MNHN MAD 8850), a subfossil specimen discovered by Etienne Thirioux before 2013 in the Vallée des Prêtres near Port Louis, Mauritius that consists solely of limb bones including a tarsometatarsus, humeri and tibiotarsi. It was similar in anatomy to the orange-headed thrush from Asia.

== Extinction ==
The Mauritius ground thrush was not mentioned by the early Dutch settlers of Mauritius who began to document the island's fauna and flora, starting in the 16th century, so it was likely extinct before the Dutch began to settle the island on 20 September 1598.

The leading theory towards the extinction of the Mauritius ground thrush is that it may have gone extinct during the 14th century when Arab traders introduced black rats onto the island of Mauritius.
