= Kivu ground thrush =

Scientific classification
- Domain: Eukaryota
- Kingdom: Animalia
- Phylum: Chordata
- Class: Aves
- Order: Passeriformes
- Family: Turdidae
- Genus: Geokichla
- Species: G. piaggiae
- Subspecies: G. p. tanganjicae

Trinomial name
- Geokichla piaggiae tanganjicae (Sassi, 1914)

Synonyms
- Zoothera piaggiae tanganjicae Zootheria tanganjicae Geokichla tanganjicae

Subspecies of bird

The Kivu ground thrush (Geokichla piaggiae tanganicae) is a bird subspecies native to the Albertine Rift montane forests. Its natural habitat is subtropical or tropical moist montane forests. It is threatened by habitat loss.

It is currently considered a subspecies of the Abyssinian ground thrush.
