= Chestnut-capped thrush =

Conservation status
- Endangered (IUCN 3.1)

Scientific classification
- Kingdom: Animalia
- Phylum: Chordata
- Class: Aves
- Order: Passeriformes
- Family: Turdidae
- Genus: Geokichla
- Species: G. interpres

Binomial name
- Geokichla interpres (Temminck, 1828)

Synonyms
- Zoothera interpres (Temminck, 1826)

Species of bird

The chestnut-capped thrush (Geokichla interpres) lives in forests and woodlands of Southeast Asia. It is a songbird species in the family Turdidae. Traditionally, it has included the Enggano thrush as a subspecies, but a recent review recommended treating them as separate. Consequently, the chestnut-capped thrush is monotypic.

The chestnut-capped thrush has a black back and a white belly with black spots. As its common name suggests, it has a chestnut cap. Its face is black with a white mark on the cheeks and another on the lores. The superficially similar chestnut-backed thrush is substantially larger when seen alongside one another, and has a black crown and rufous back, whereas the Enggano thrush has an olive-ochre back and little or no white on the lores and auriculars.

The chestnut-capped thrush is very rare in zoos. According to ISIS, Chester Zoo had the only female outside of Asia, until she died in 2007. However, small numbers have been held in private European aviaries since the mid-1990s and very small numbers remain as of late 2009.

It was formerly classified as a species of Least Concern by the IUCN. New research has shown it to be rarer than previously believed. Consequently, it was uplisted to Near Threatened status in 2008 and once again to Endangered in 2020.
