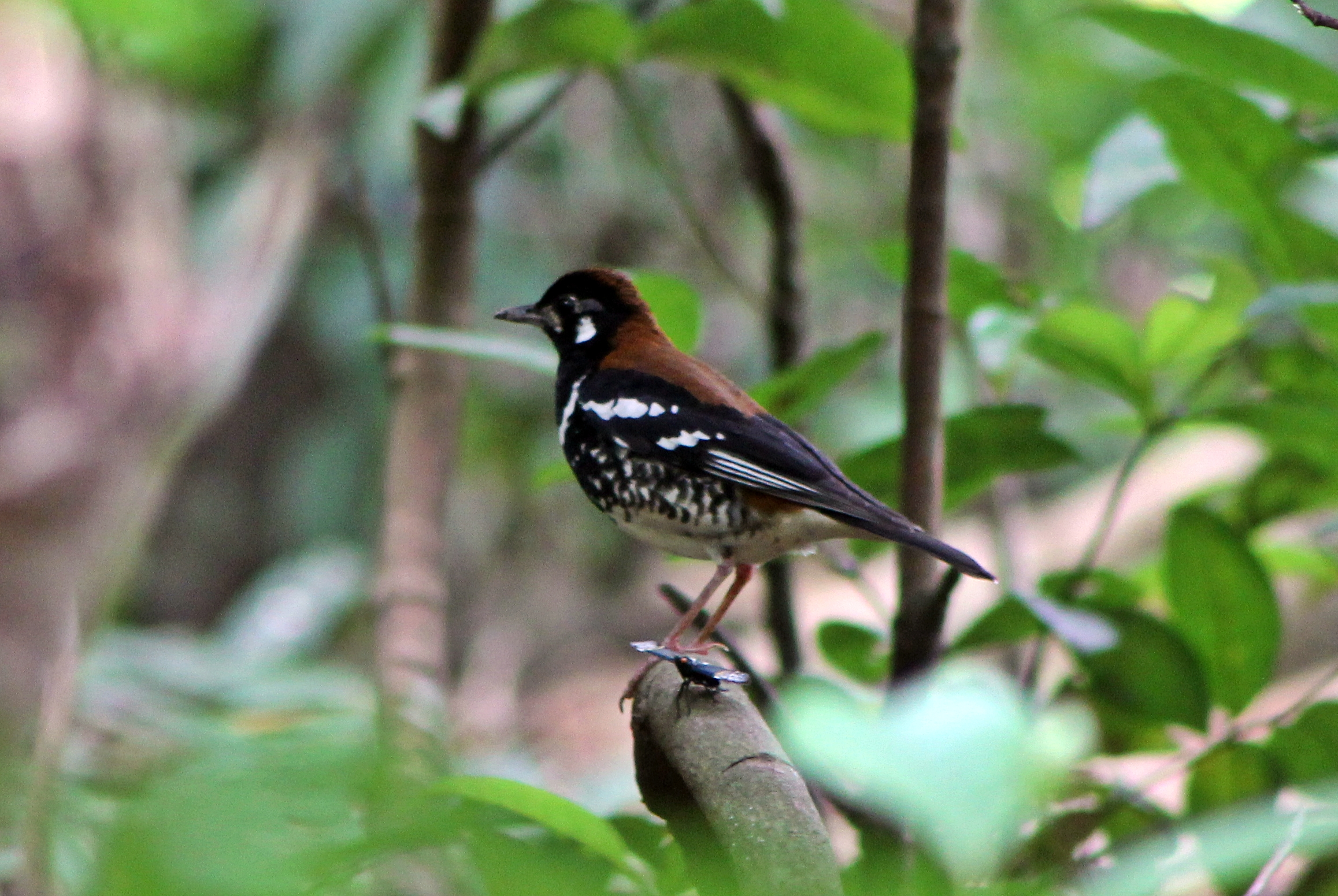

Conservation status
- Near Threatened (IUCN 3.1)

Scientific classification
- Kingdom: Animalia
- Phylum: Chordata
- Class: Aves
- Order: Passeriformes
- Family: Turdidae
- Genus: Geokichla
- Species: G. erythronota

Binomial name
- Geokichla erythronota PL Sclater, 1859

Synonyms
- Zoothera erythronota

= Red-backed thrush =

Species of bird

The red-backed thrush or rusty-backed thrush (Geokichla erythronota) is a species of bird in the family Turdidae. Traditionally, it included the red-and-black thrush (Z. mendeni) as a subspecies. It is endemic to forests on Sulawesi and the nearby islands of Buton and Kabaena in Indonesia. It is becoming rare due to habitat destruction.

== Taxonomy ==
Geokichla erythronota is very similar in morphology to the chestnut-backed thrush (Geokichla dohertyi) and some authorities believe they are conspecific. Others believe they are distinct. A subspecies (G. e. kabaena) has been named from Kabaena and some researchers believe there is an unnamed race of G. erythronota on the island of Buton, the status of which needs to be evaluated.

== Description ==
The red-backed thrush is about 20 cm (8 in) long and the sexes are largely similar in appearance.
