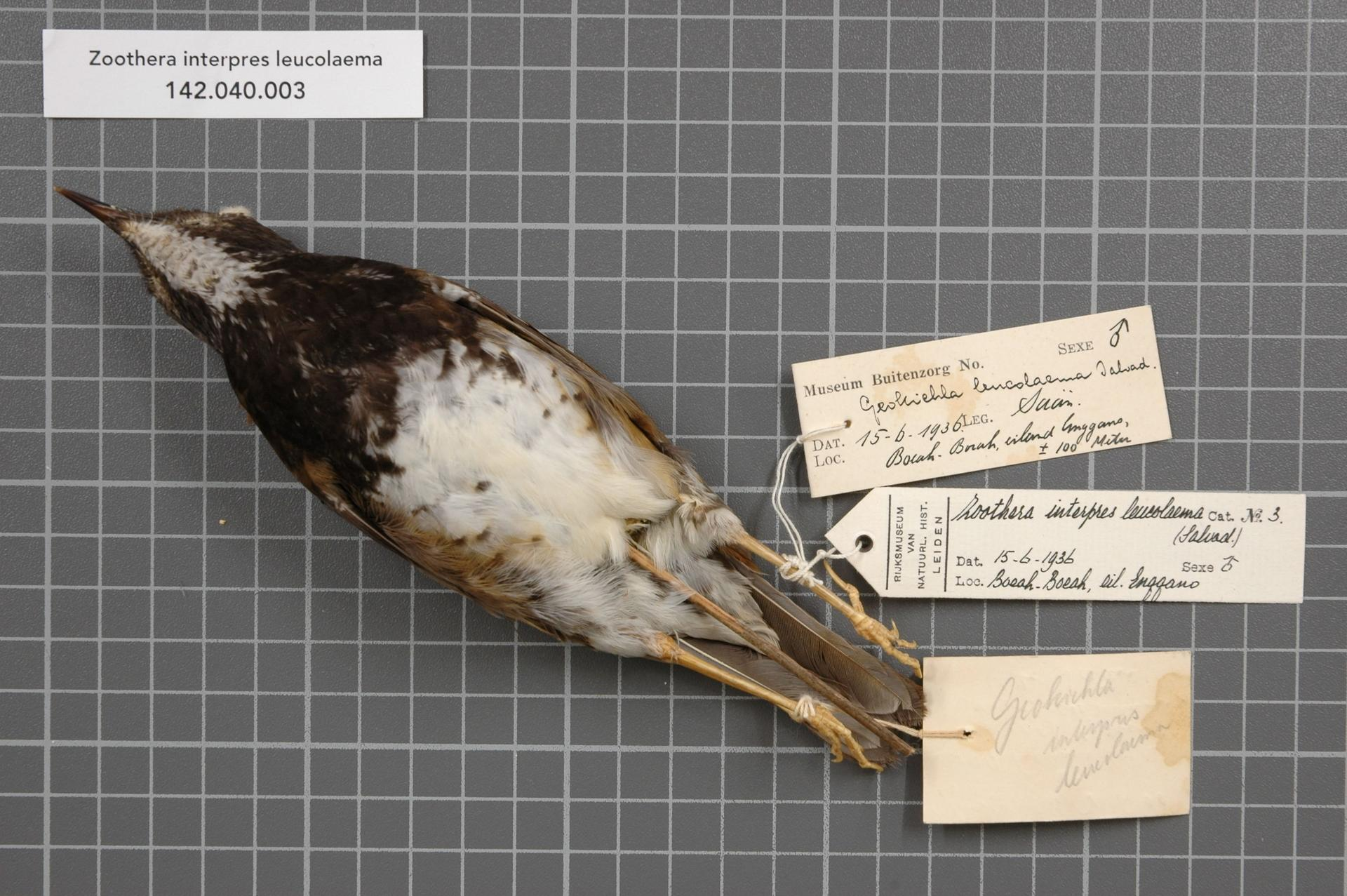

Conservation status
- Near Threatened (IUCN 3.1)

Scientific classification
- Kingdom: Animalia
- Phylum: Chordata
- Class: Aves
- Order: Passeriformes
- Family: Turdidae
- Genus: Geokichla
- Species: G. leucolaema

Binomial name
- Geokichla leucolaema Salvadori, 1892

Synonyms
- Zoothera interpres leucolaema Zoothera leucolaema

= Enggano thrush =

Species of bird

The Enggano thrush (Geokichla leucolaema) is a species of bird in the family Turdidae. It is endemic to rainforests on Enggano Island off Sumatra in Indonesia. It has traditionally been considered a subspecies of the chestnut-capped thrush.

It is threatened by habitat loss.
