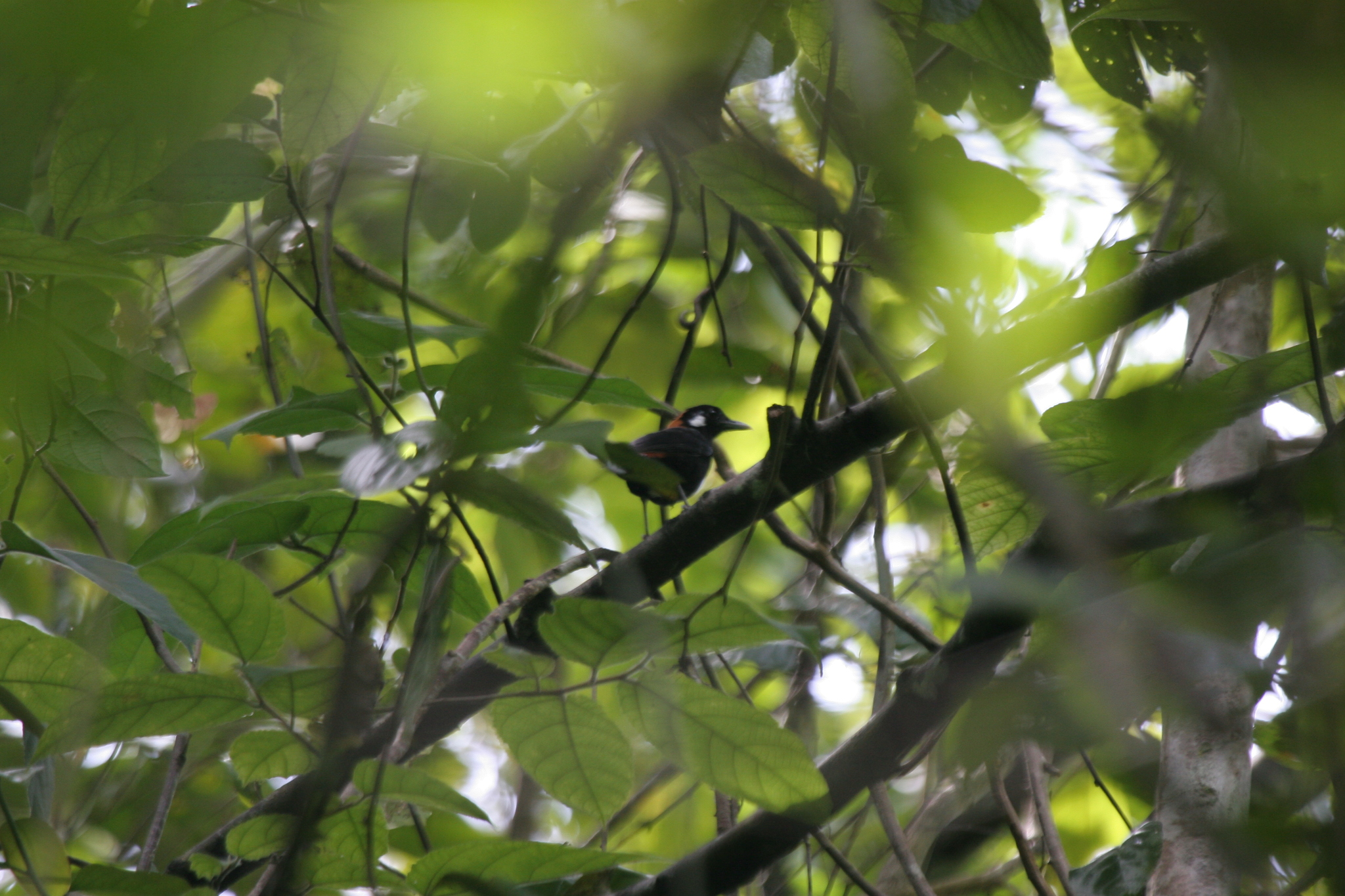

Conservation status
- Near Threatened (IUCN 3.1)

Scientific classification
- Kingdom: Animalia
- Phylum: Chordata
- Class: Aves
- Order: Passeriformes
- Family: Turdidae
- Genus: Geokichla
- Species: G. mendeni

Binomial name
- Geokichla mendeni (Neumann, 1939)

Synonyms
- Zoothera erythonota mendeni Zoothera mendeni

= Red-and-black thrush =

Species of bird

The red-and-black thrush (Geokichla mendeni), also known as the Peleng thrush, is a species of bird in the family Turdidae. It is endemic to forests on the Indonesian islands of Taliabu and Peleng, where threatened by habitat loss. Traditionally, it has been considered a subspecies of the red-backed thrush.
