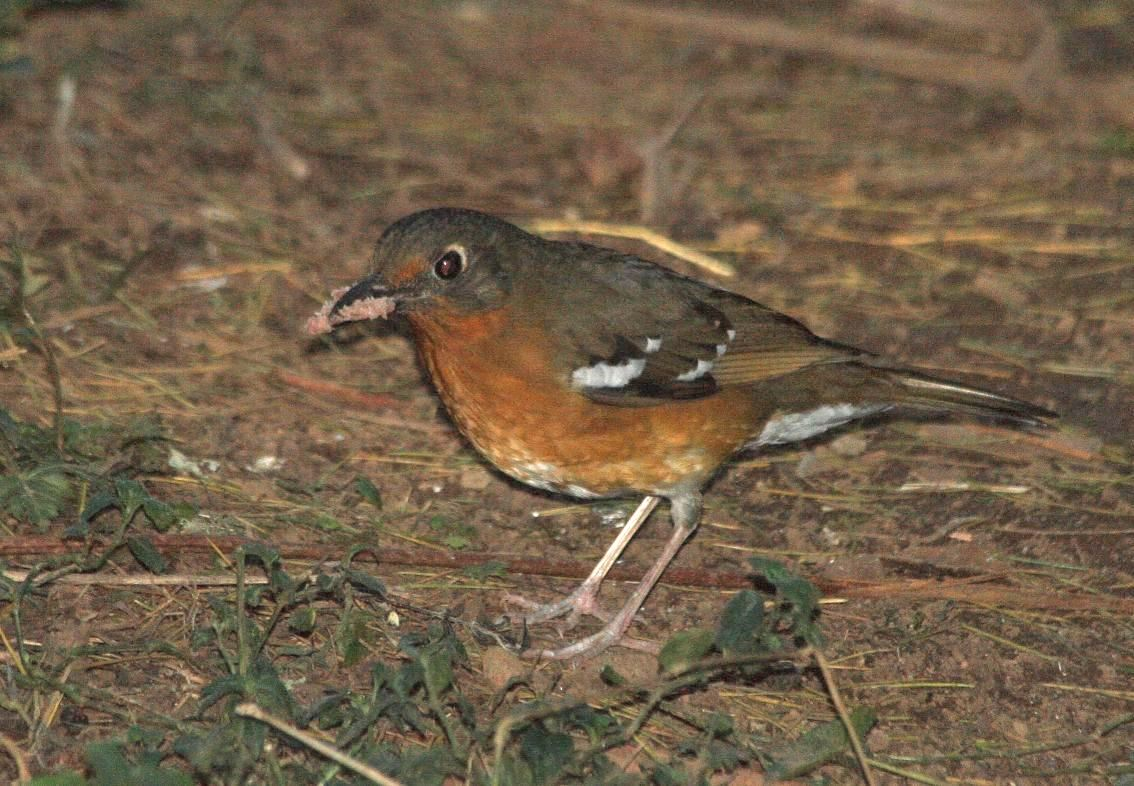

Conservation status
- Least Concern (IUCN 3.1)

Scientific classification
- Kingdom: Animalia
- Phylum: Chordata
- Class: Aves
- Order: Passeriformes
- Family: Turdidae
- Genus: Geokichla
- Species: G. gurneyi

Binomial name
- Geokichla gurneyi (Hartlaub, 1864)

Synonyms
- Zoothera gurneyi Turdus gurneyi

= Orange ground thrush =

Species of bird

The orange ground thrush (Geokichla gurneyi) is a species of bird in the family Turdidae.

== Taxonomy ==
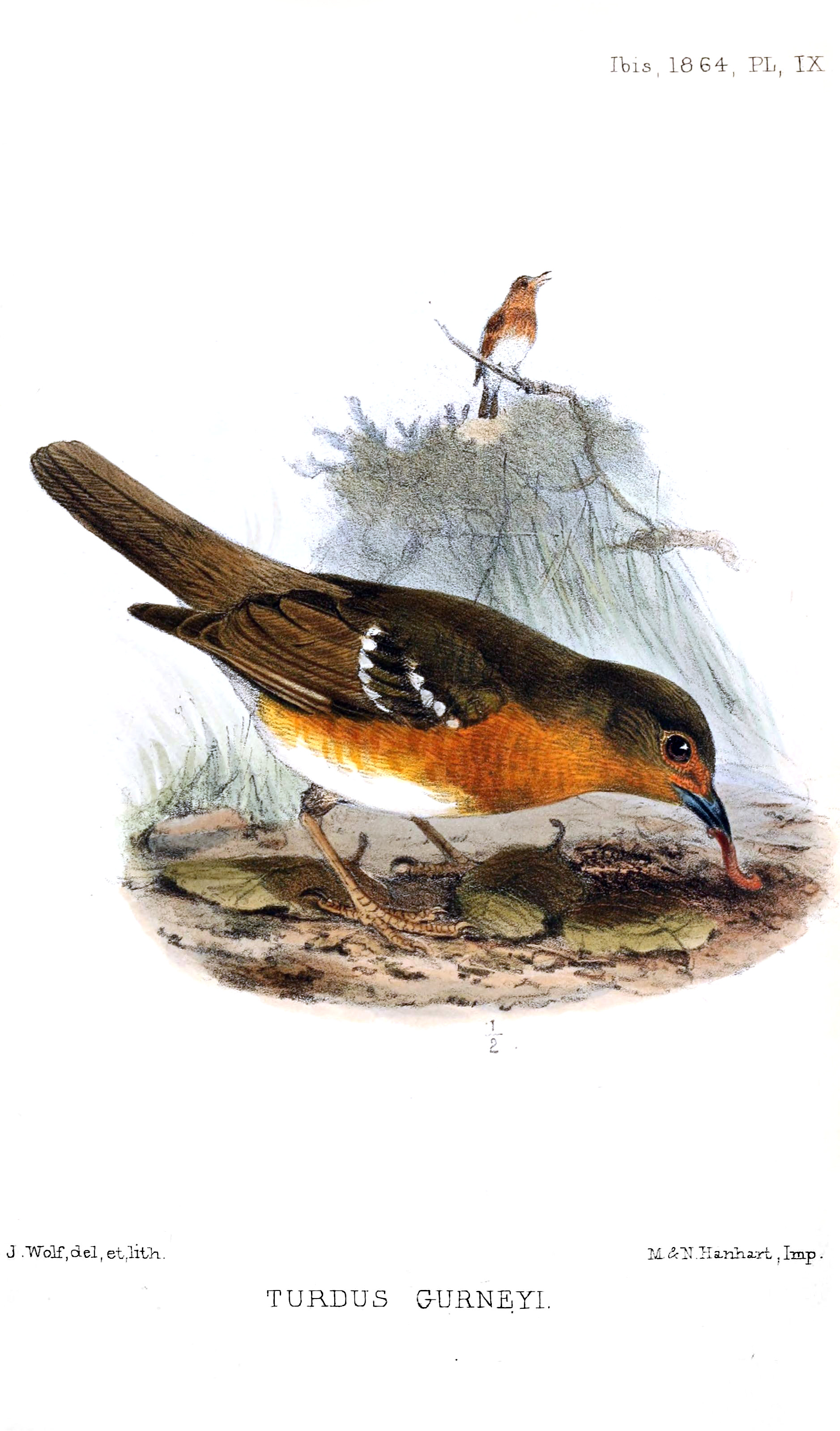
Illustration by Joseph Wolf

The orange ground thrush was described as Turdus gurneyi by Hartlaub in 1864. It is named after John Henry Gurney Sr., an English banker, politician and ornithologist. There are five subspecies: G. g. chuka found in central Kenya; G. g. raineyi found in southeastern Kenya; G. g. otomitra found in western Angola, southeastern Democratic Republic of the Congo, Tanzania, and northern Malawi; G. g. gurneyi found in eastern South Africa; and G. g. disruptans found in central Malawi to northeastern South Africa.

== Distribution and habitat ==
Its habitat is montane forests, namely the afromontane of southeastern Africa. The size of its range is estimated at 5,370,000 km^{2} (2,070,000 sq mi). It is found at elevations of 500–2,500 m (1,600–8,200 ft).

== Description ==
Its length is 21–23 cm (8.3–9.1 in). The male weighs 44.5–64.5 g (1.57–2.28 oz), and the female weighs 48.5–76 g (1.71–2.68 oz). The upperparts are olive-brown; some parts have a grey tinge. The flight feathers are blackish-brown. There are two bars on the wing. The throat, breast and flanks are orange. The vent is white. There is an incomplete white eye-ring. The beak is dark. The legs are pink. The female is similar to the male but is less bright. The immature has mottled underparts.

== Behaviour ==
The orange ground thrush is crepuscular. It is sedentary, but makes altitudinal movements in some regions. Its call is tsip and cureek. Its song is a series of several mellow and melodious notes. It feeds on the ground. Its diet is earthworms, insects, molluscs and fruits. The breeding season is January to May in Kenya, August to December in Tanzania, October to January in Malawi, and September to December in Mozambique, South Africa and Zimbabwe. In breeding pairs, the female has been observed to consistently weigh more than the male. The nest is a deep cup built of moss, twigs, leaves, roots and ferns. There are 2 to 3 turquoise-blue eggs. The eggs are incubated for 15 days. The fledging period is 18 to 20 days.

== Status ==
Its population size is not known. Its population is declining because of habitat loss. The IUCN Red List has listed the species as least concern because it has a large range and its population is not declining quickly enough for it to be considered vulnerable.
