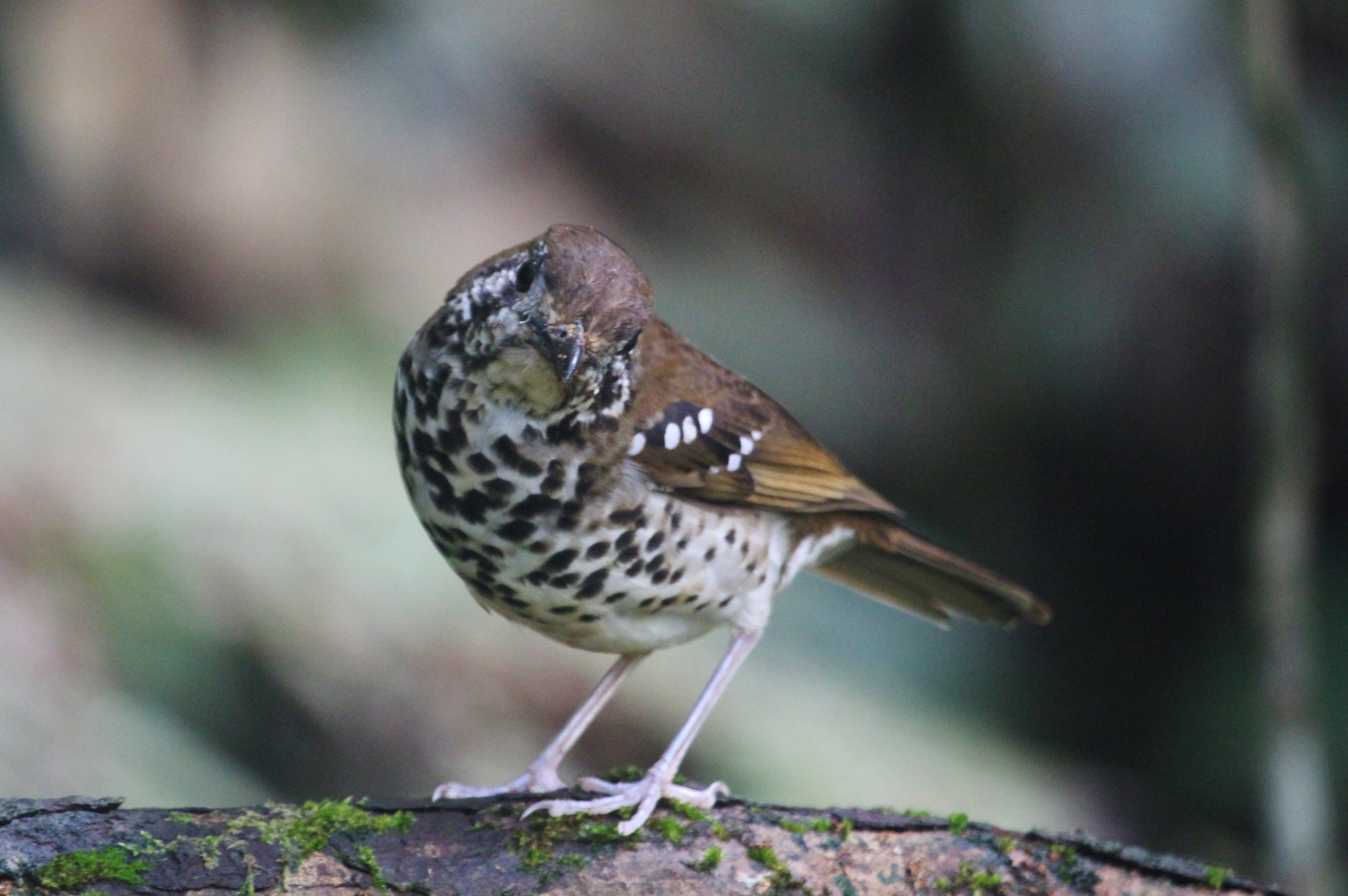
- An endemic Spot-winged Thrush in the Sinharaja Forest Reserve, Sri Lanka

Conservation status
- Near Threatened (IUCN 3.1)

Scientific classification
- Kingdom: Animalia
- Phylum: Chordata
- Class: Aves
- Order: Passeriformes
- Family: Turdidae
- Genus: Geokichla
- Species: G. spiloptera

Binomial name
- Geokichla spiloptera (Blyth, 1847)
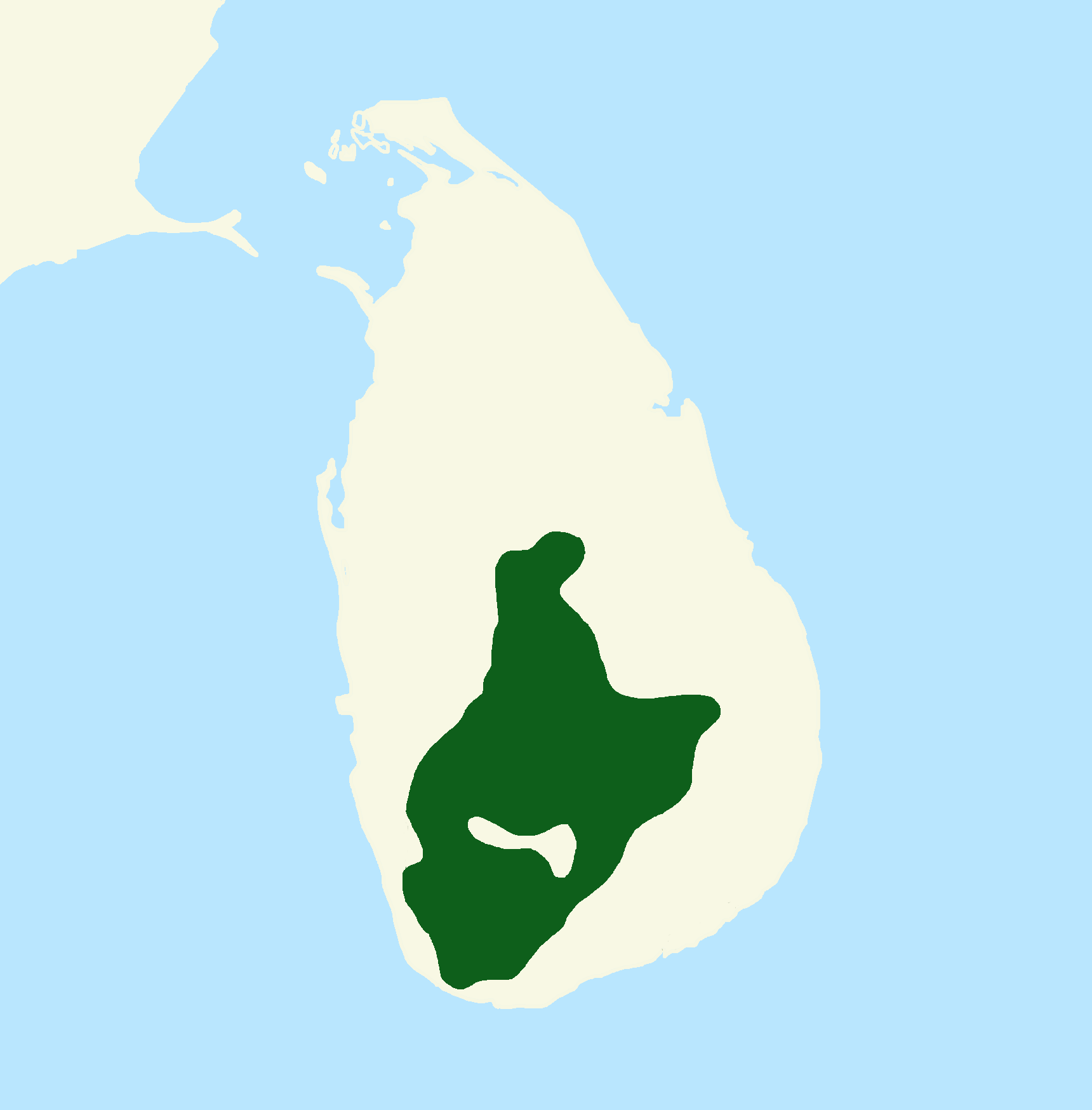

Synonyms
- Zoothera spiloptera

= Spot-winged thrush =

Species of bird

The spot-winged thrush (Geokichla spiloptera) is an Asian thrush, a group within the large thrush family Turdidae. It is an endemic resident breeder in Sri Lanka.

== Description ==
Adults of this medium-sized thrush, which measures 21 to 23 cm (8.3 to 9.1 in) in total length and weighs 70 g (2.5 oz) are light brown above with a double wing bar of white spots. The pale face has two dark bars. The underparts are white with heavy spotting. The bill is black and legs are yellow. The song is a rich and varied whistling. Young birds have buff streaking on the upperparts, and the face and the underparts are light brown with heavy streaking.

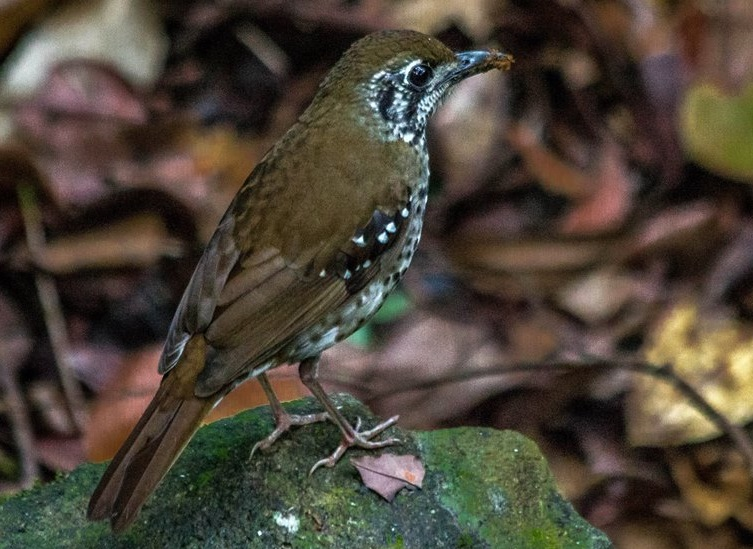

== Ecology & Behavior ==
The spot-winged thrush breeds in hill rainforests, and to a lesser extent in drier woodlands, at altitudes between 500 and 2,000 metres (1,600 and 6,600 ft). The wintering areas are similar, but include less well-wooded areas, generally at altitutdes between 750 and 1,500 metres (2,460 and 4,920 ft). The spot-winged thrush is generally solitary and can be quite secretive, especially in the dense undergrowth and bamboo clumps it favours.

The loose cup nests are lined with vegetation and placed in a tree fork. Two to three buff or bluish-green eggs are laid. This species raises two broods each year.

Spot-winged thrushes are omnivorous, but eat far more insects than fruit. They feed on the ground.

== In culture ==
In Sri Lanka, this bird is known as Pulli Wal Awichchiya in the Sinhala language.

== Gallery ==
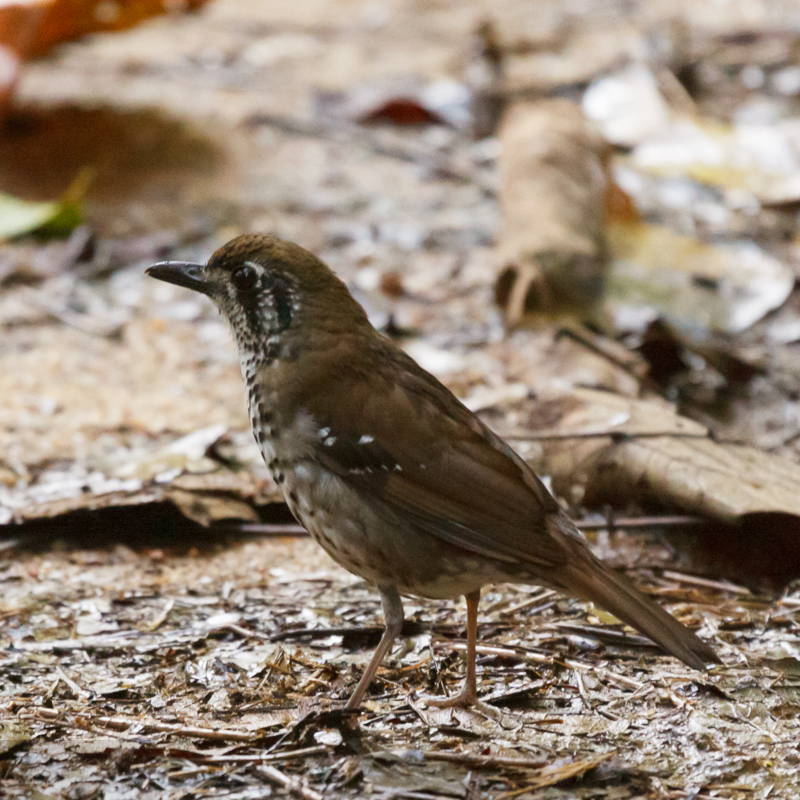
A spot-winged thrush in the bush

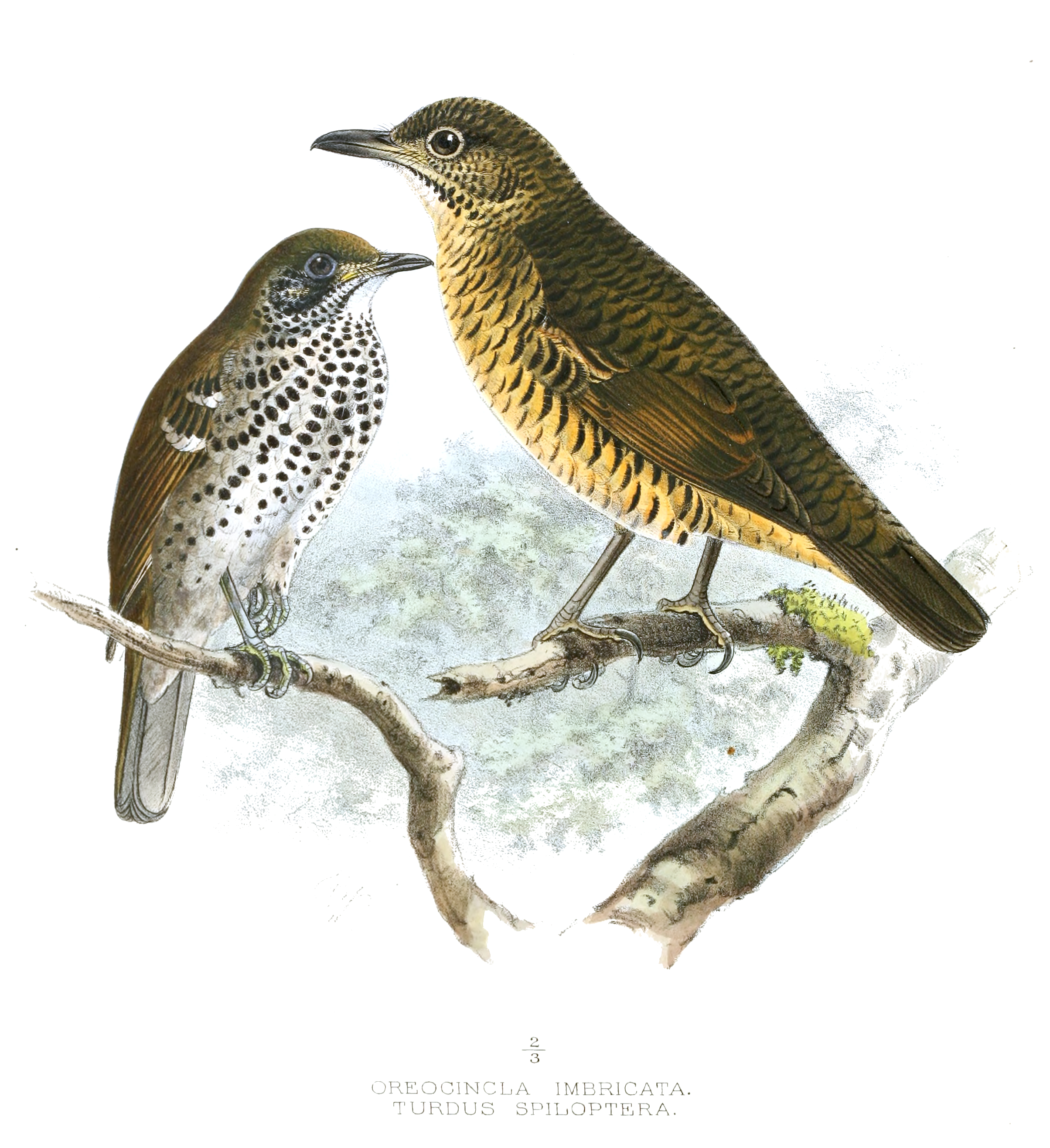
An illustration by Keulemans (1878)
