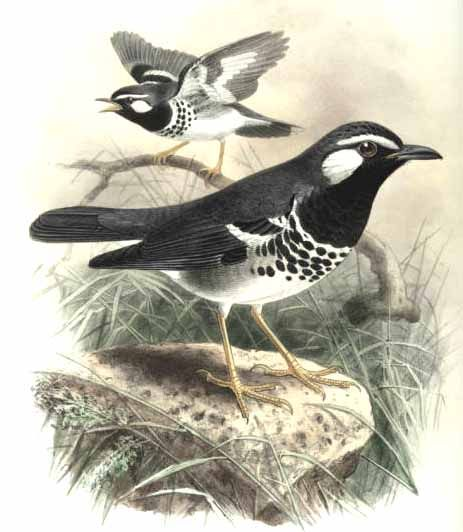
- Illustration by John Gerrard Keulemans
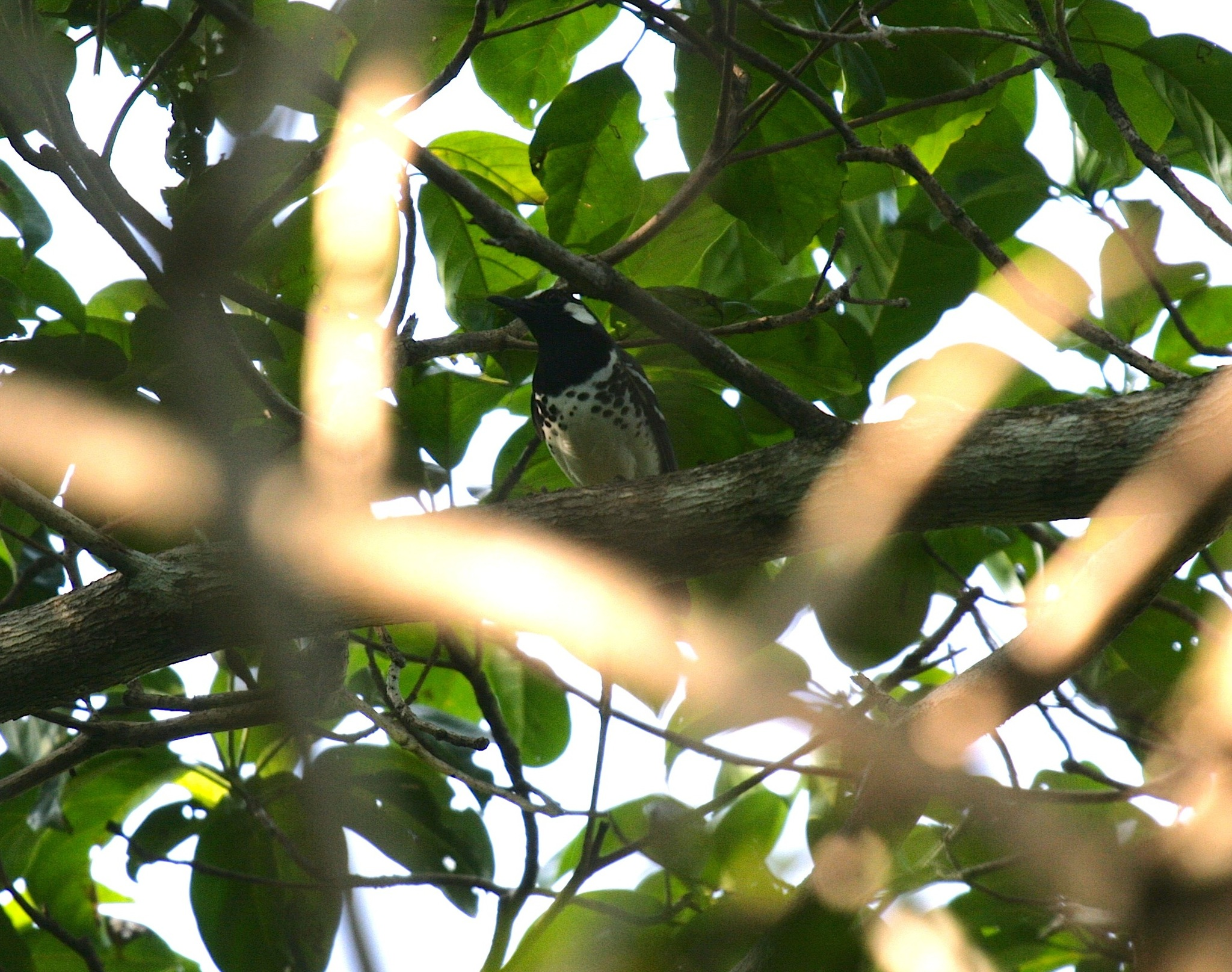

Conservation status
- Near Threatened (IUCN 3.1)

Scientific classification
- Kingdom: Animalia
- Phylum: Chordata
- Class: Aves
- Order: Passeriformes
- Family: Turdidae
- Genus: Geokichla
- Species: G. schistacea

Binomial name
- Geokichla schistacea Meyer, 1884

Synonyms
- Zoothera schistacea

= Slaty-backed thrush =

Species of bird

The slaty-backed thrush (Geokichla schistacea) is a passerine bird in the Asian thrush genus. It is found in the Tanimbar Islands.
