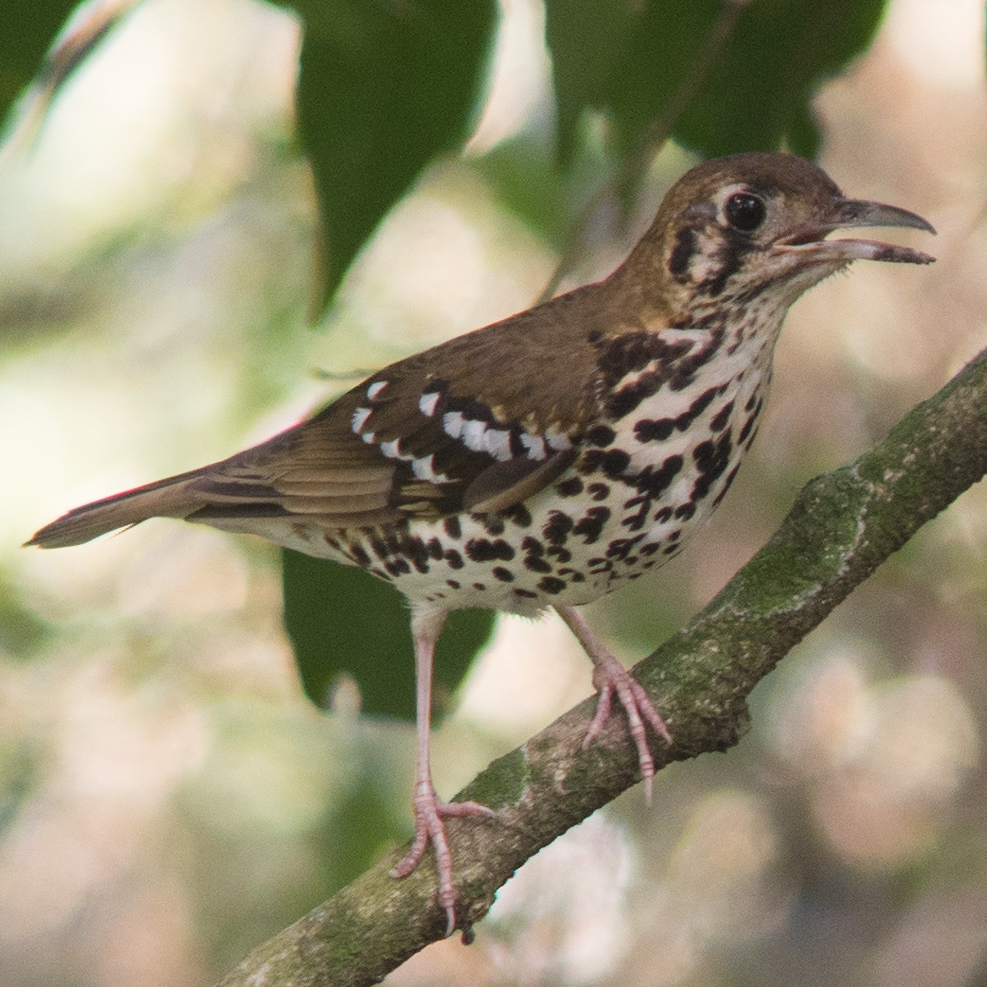
- Zoothera guttata from Dlinza Forest, South Africa

Conservation status
- Vulnerable (IUCN 3.1)

Scientific classification
- Kingdom: Animalia
- Phylum: Chordata
- Class: Aves
- Order: Passeriformes
- Family: Turdidae
- Genus: Geokichla
- Species: G. guttata

Binomial name
- Geokichla guttata (Vigors, 1831)

Synonyms
- Zoothera guttata

= Spotted ground thrush =

Species of bird

The spotted ground thrush (Geokichla guttata) is a species of bird in the family Turdidae. It is found in the Democratic Republic of the Congo, Kenya, Malawi, South Africa, Sudan, Tanzania, and possibly Mozambique.

== Description ==
These birds are about 23 cm in length, with brown upper parts and white to off-white lower parts which are darkly spotted.

== Habitat ==
Its natural habitats are subtropical or tropical dry forest, subtropical or tropical moist lowland forest, subtropical or tropical moist montane forest, and subtropical or tropical moist shrubland. It is threatened by habitat loss.

== Biology and behaviour ==
The spotted ground thrush spends much of its time in leaf-litter on the forest floor where it flicks through the leaves in search of small invertebrates, and despite its distinctive colouration, it is often difficult to see.

In KwaZulu-Natal, South Africa, the birds have distinctive winter and summer ranges. In winter these birds spend their time in remnant coastal forests, and in summer they move to forests further inland.

The birds lay bluish-coloured eggs in a cup-shaped nest.
