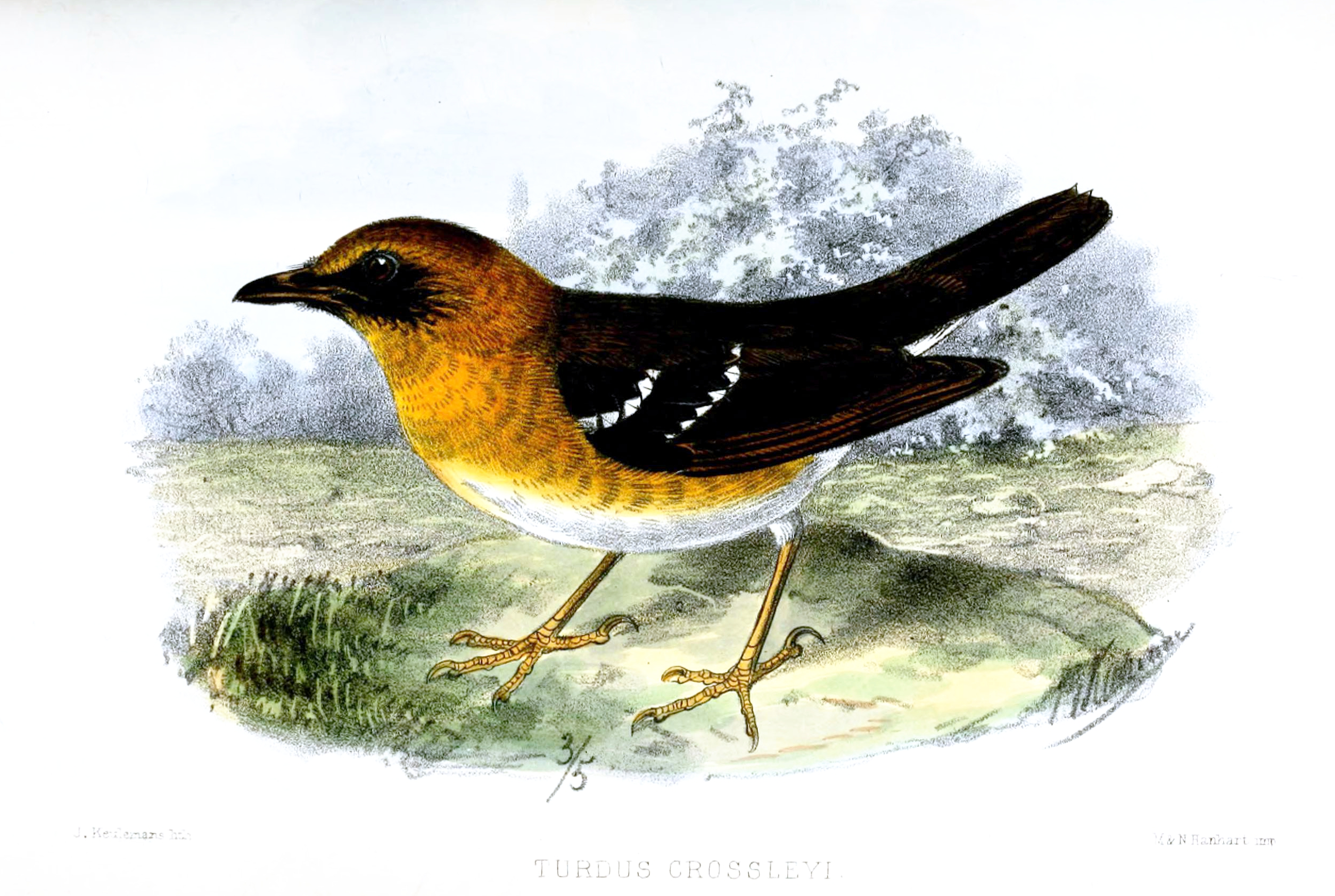
- Crossley's ground thrush (Geokichla crossleyi)

Scientific classification
- Kingdom: Animalia
- Phylum: Chordata
- Class: Aves
- Order: Passeriformes
- Family: Turdidae
- Genus: Geokichla; S. Müller, 1836

Type species
- Turdus citrinus Latham, 1790

= Geokichla =

Genus of birds

Geokichla, from Ancient Greek γεω- (geō-), meaning "ground", and κιχλη (kikhlē), meaning "thrush", are a genus of medium-sized thrushes who are mostly insectivorous or omnivorous in the thrush family, Turdidae. They were traditionally listed in the Zoothera, but molecular phylogenetic studies published in 2008 led to their placement in a separate genus.

== Taxonomy ==
The genus Geokichla was introduced in 1836 by the German naturalist Salomon Müller with Turdus citrinus Latham, 1790, the orange-headed thrush, as the type species. The genus name comes from Ancient Greek γεω- (geō-), meaning "ground", and κιχλη (kikhlē), meaning "thrush.

These species were formerly placed in the genus Zoothera. Molecular phylogenetic analysis by Gary Voelker and collaborators published in 2008 found that Zoothera was polyphyletic. To create monophyletic genera 21 species were moved from Zoothera to the resurrected genus Geokichla.

== List of species ==
The genus contains the following 21 species:

Image	Scientific name	Common name	Distribution
	Geokichla sibirica	Siberian thrush	Siberia, Manchuria and Japan ; winters to Southeast Asia
	Geokichla wardii	Pied thrush	Himalayas ; winters to Sri Lanka
	Geokichla princei	Grey ground thrush	African tropical rainforest
-	Geokichla camaronensis	Black-eared ground thrush	western and northeastern Central Africa
	Geokichla guttata	Spotted ground thrush	very sparsely across sub-Saharan Africa
	Geokichla spiloptera	Spot-winged thrush	montane forests of Sri Lanka
	Geokichla crossleyi	Crossley's ground thrush	Western High Plateau and Ruwenzori
	Geokichla piaggiae	Abyssinian ground thrush	eastern Afromontane
	Geokichla oberlaenderi	Oberländer's ground thrush	northeastern Congo Basin
	Geokichla gurneyi	Orange ground thrush	eastern/southern Afromontane
	Geokichla citrina	Orange-headed thrush	Indomalayan realm
	Geokichla dumasi	Buru thrush	Buru
-	Geokichla joyceyi	Seram thrush	Seram
	Geokichla peronii	Orange-sided thrush	Timor and southern Moluccas
	Geokichla schistacea	Slaty-backed thrush	Tanimbar Islands
	Geokichla interpres	Chestnut-capped thrush	Malaysia
	Geokichla leucolaema	Enggano thrush	Enggano Island
	Geokichla dohertyi	Chestnut-backed thrush	eastern Lesser Sundas
	Geokichla cinerea	Ashy thrush	northern Philippines
	Geokichla erythronota	Red-backed thrush	Sulawesi
	Geokichla mendeni	Red-and-black thrush	Taliabu and Peleng

A subfossil specimen of a ground thrush has been found on the island of Mauritius:

- Mauritius ground thrush, Geokichla longitarsus
