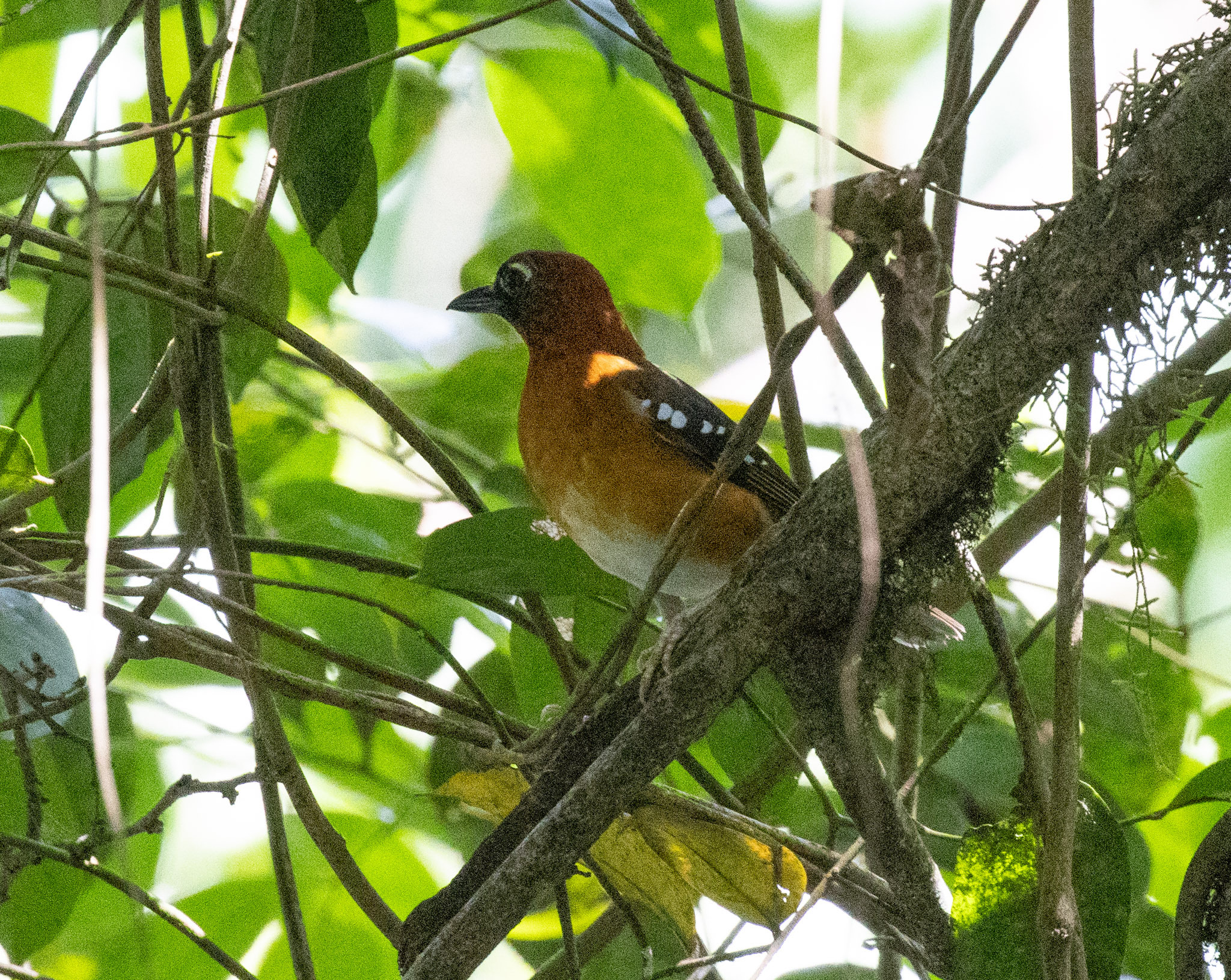

Conservation status
- Least Concern (IUCN 3.1)

Scientific classification
- Kingdom: Animalia
- Phylum: Chordata
- Class: Aves
- Order: Passeriformes
- Family: Turdidae
- Genus: Geokichla
- Species: G. crossleyi

Binomial name
- Geokichla crossleyi (Sharpe, 1871)

Synonyms
- Zoothera crossleyi

= Crossley's ground thrush =

Species of bird

Crossley's ground thrush (Geokichla crossleyi) is a species of bird in the family Turdidae. It is found in Cameroon, Republic of the Congo, Democratic Republic of the Congo, and Nigeria.

Its natural habitat is subtropical or tropical moist montane forests. It is becoming rare due to habitat loss.
