= Seram thrush =

Conservation status
- Near Threatened (IUCN 3.1)

Scientific classification
- Kingdom: Animalia
- Phylum: Chordata
- Class: Aves
- Order: Passeriformes
- Family: Turdidae
- Genus: Geokichla
- Species: G. joiceyi

Binomial name
- Geokichla joiceyi (Rothschild & Hartert, 1921)

Synonyms
- Zoothera dumasi joiceyi Zoothera joiceyi

Species of bird

The Seram thrush (Geokichla joiceyi) is a species of bird in the family Turdidae. It is endemic to montane rainforest on Seram in Indonesia. Traditionally, it has been considered a subspecies of the Buru thrush, in which case the common name of the 'combined species' was Moluccan thrush.
