= Black-eared ground thrush =

Conservation status
- Least Concern (IUCN 3.1)]

Scientific classification
- Kingdom: Animalia
- Phylum: Chordata
- Class: Aves
- Order: Passeriformes
- Family: Turdidae
- Genus: Geokichla
- Species: G. camaronensis

Binomial name
- Geokichla camaronensis Sharpe, 1905

Synonyms
- Zoothera camaronensis

Species of bird

The black-eared ground thrush (Geokichla camaronensis) is a species of bird in the family Turdidae. It is found in Cameroon, Democratic Republic of the Congo, Equatorial Guinea, Gabon, and Uganda. Its natural habitats are subtropical or tropical moist lowland forests and subtropical or tropical moist montane forests.

The subspecies G. c. kibalensis of the Kibale Forest in western Uganda is sometimes regarded as a separate species, the Kibale ground-thrush.
