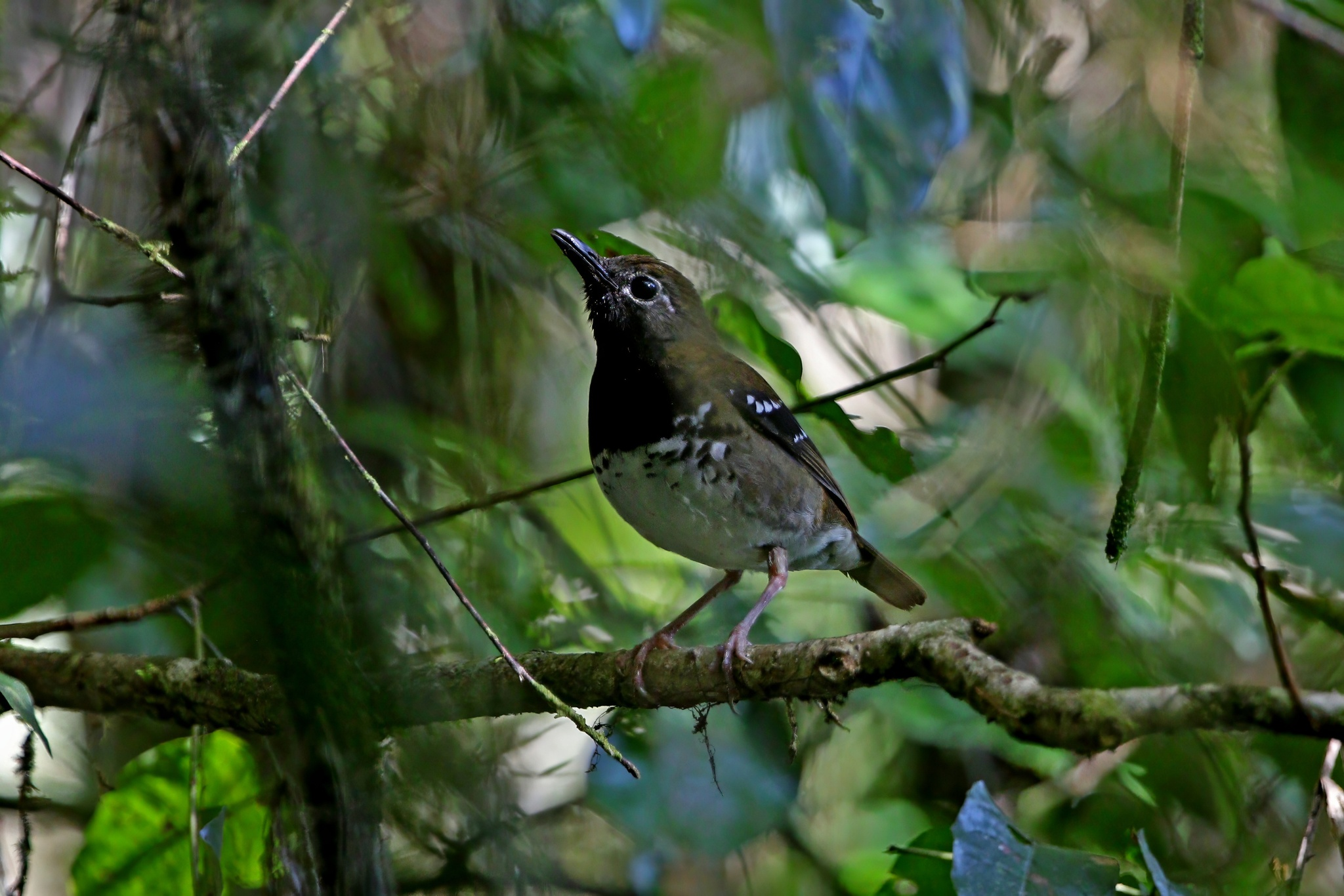

Conservation status
- Near Threatened (IUCN 3.1)

Scientific classification
- Kingdom: Animalia
- Phylum: Chordata
- Class: Aves
- Order: Passeriformes
- Family: Turdidae
- Genus: Geokichla
- Species: G. dumasi

Binomial name
- Geokichla dumasi Rothschild, 1899

Synonyms
- Zoothera dumasi

= Buru thrush =

Species of bird

The Buru thrush (Geokichla dumasi) is a species of bird in the family Turdidae. It is endemic to montane rainforest on Buru in Indonesia. Traditionally, it included the Seram thrush as a subspecies, in which case the common name of the 'combined species' was Moluccan thrush.
