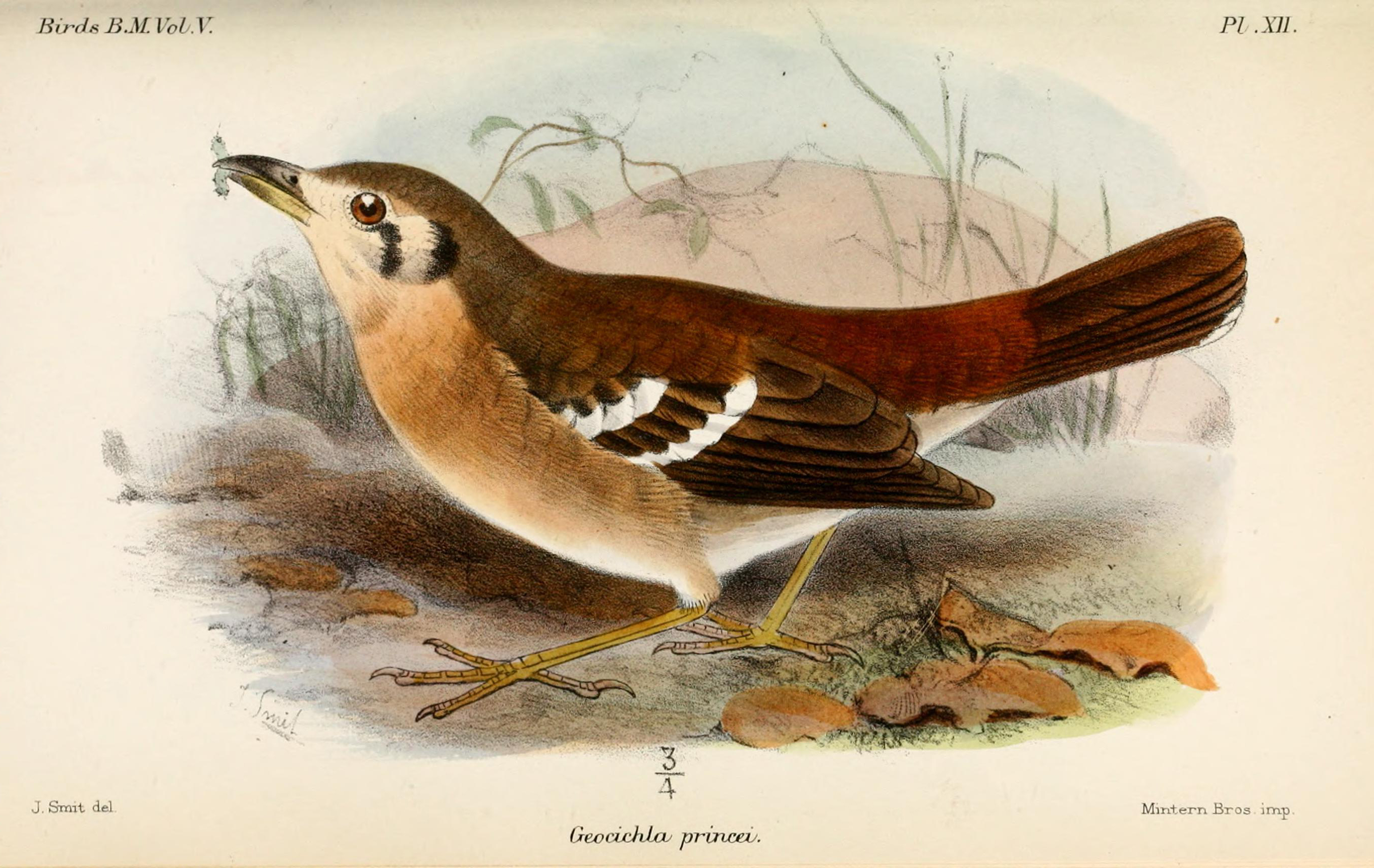
- Illustration by Keulemans, 1881

Conservation status
- Least Concern (IUCN 3.1)

Scientific classification
- Kingdom: Animalia
- Phylum: Chordata
- Class: Aves
- Order: Passeriformes
- Family: Turdidae
- Genus: Geokichla
- Species: G. princei

Binomial name
- Geokichla princei (Sharpe, 1874)

Synonyms
- Zoothera princei

= Grey ground thrush =

Species of bird

The grey ground thrush (Geokichla princei) is a species of bird in the family Turdidae.

== Distribution and habitat ==
It is native to the Guineo-Congolian region. Its natural habitat is subtropical or tropical moist lowland forests.
