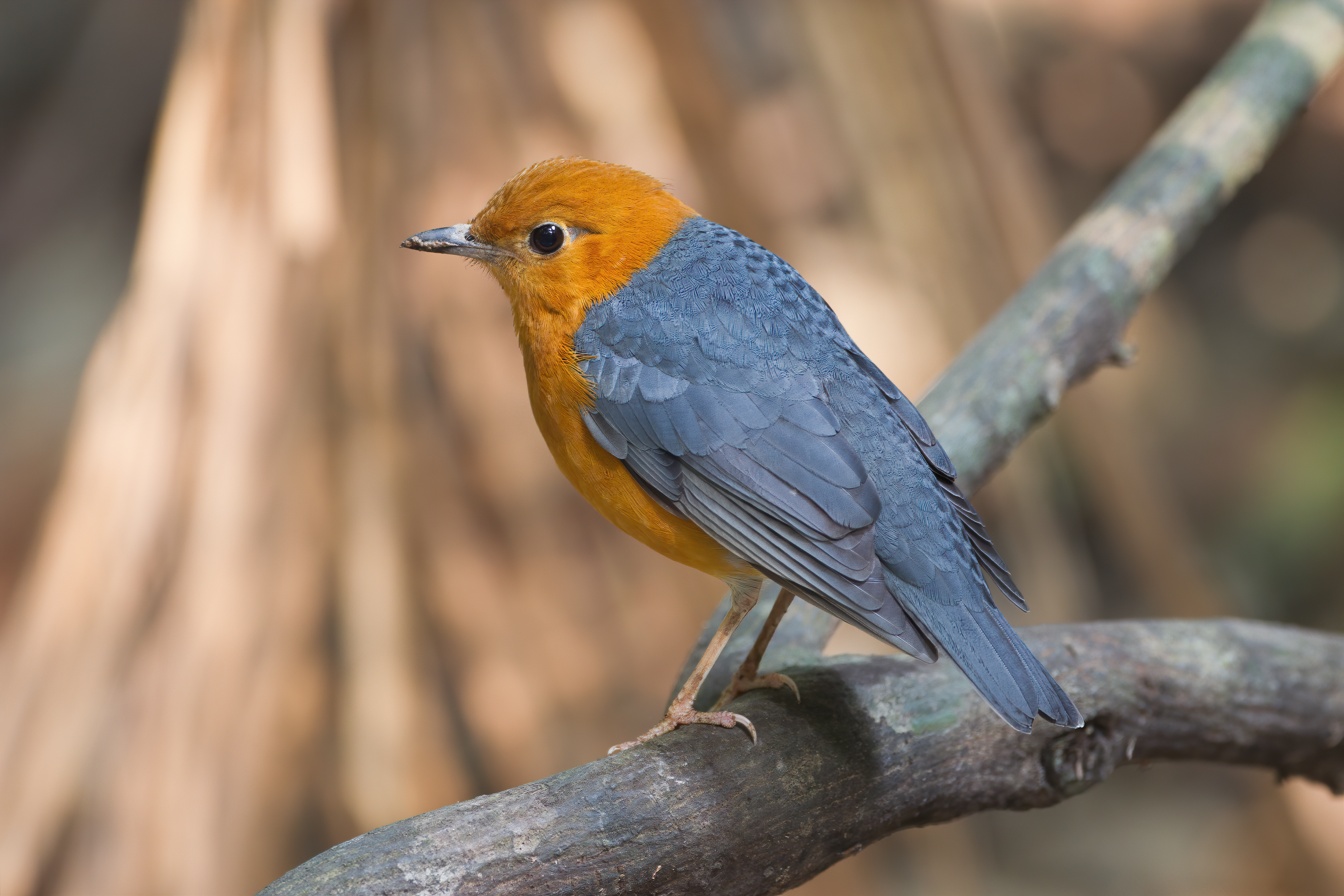
- Male, ssp. innotata, in Khao Yai National Park, Thailand Song of G. c. cyanota

Conservation status
- Least Concern (IUCN 3.1)

Scientific classification
- Kingdom: Animalia
- Phylum: Chordata
- Class: Aves
- Order: Passeriformes
- Family: Turdidae
- Genus: Geokichla
- Species: G. citrina

Binomial name
- Geokichla citrina (Latham, 1790)

Synonyms
- Zoothera citrina (Latham, 1790)

= Orange-headed thrush =

Species of bird

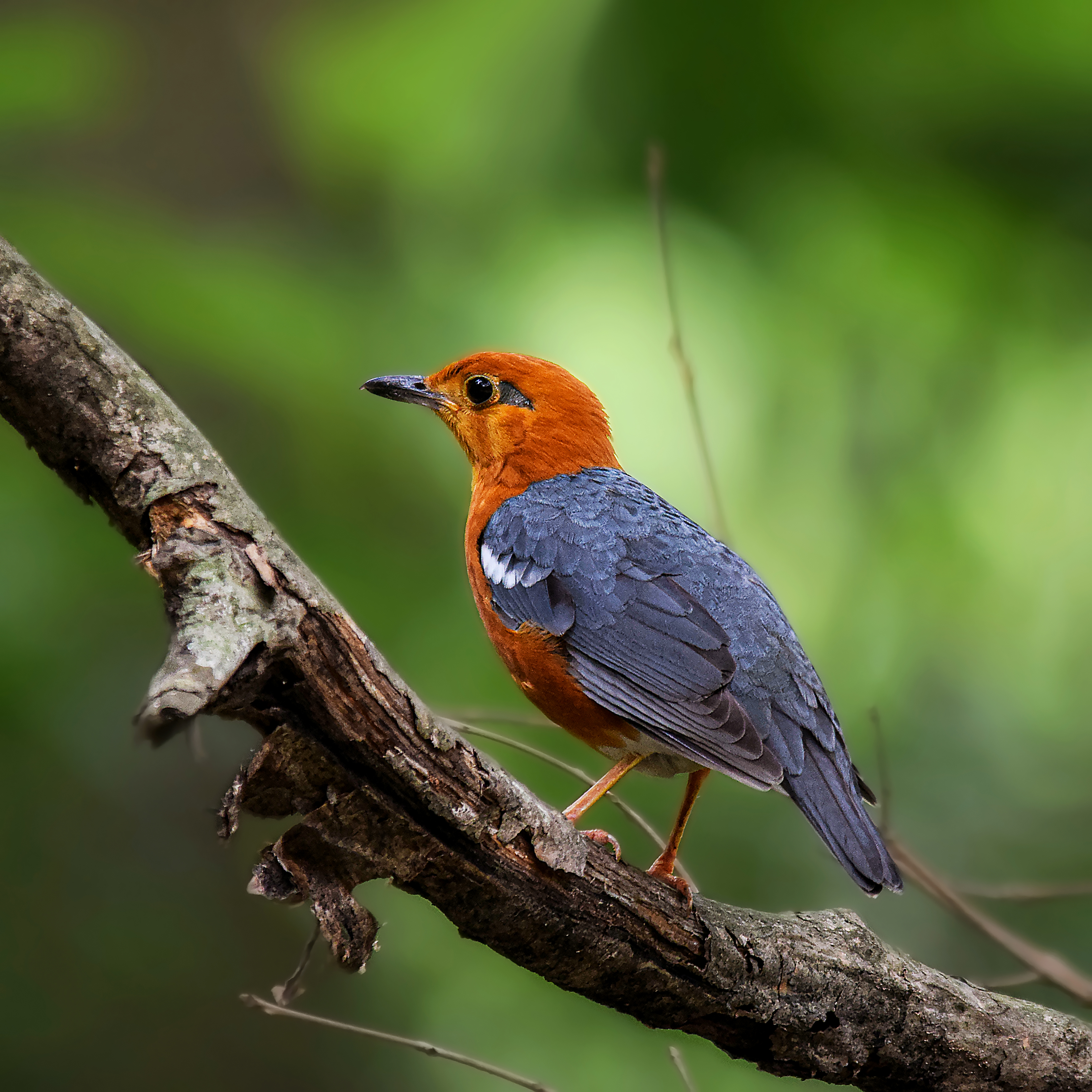
Orange-headed thrush from Bangladesh

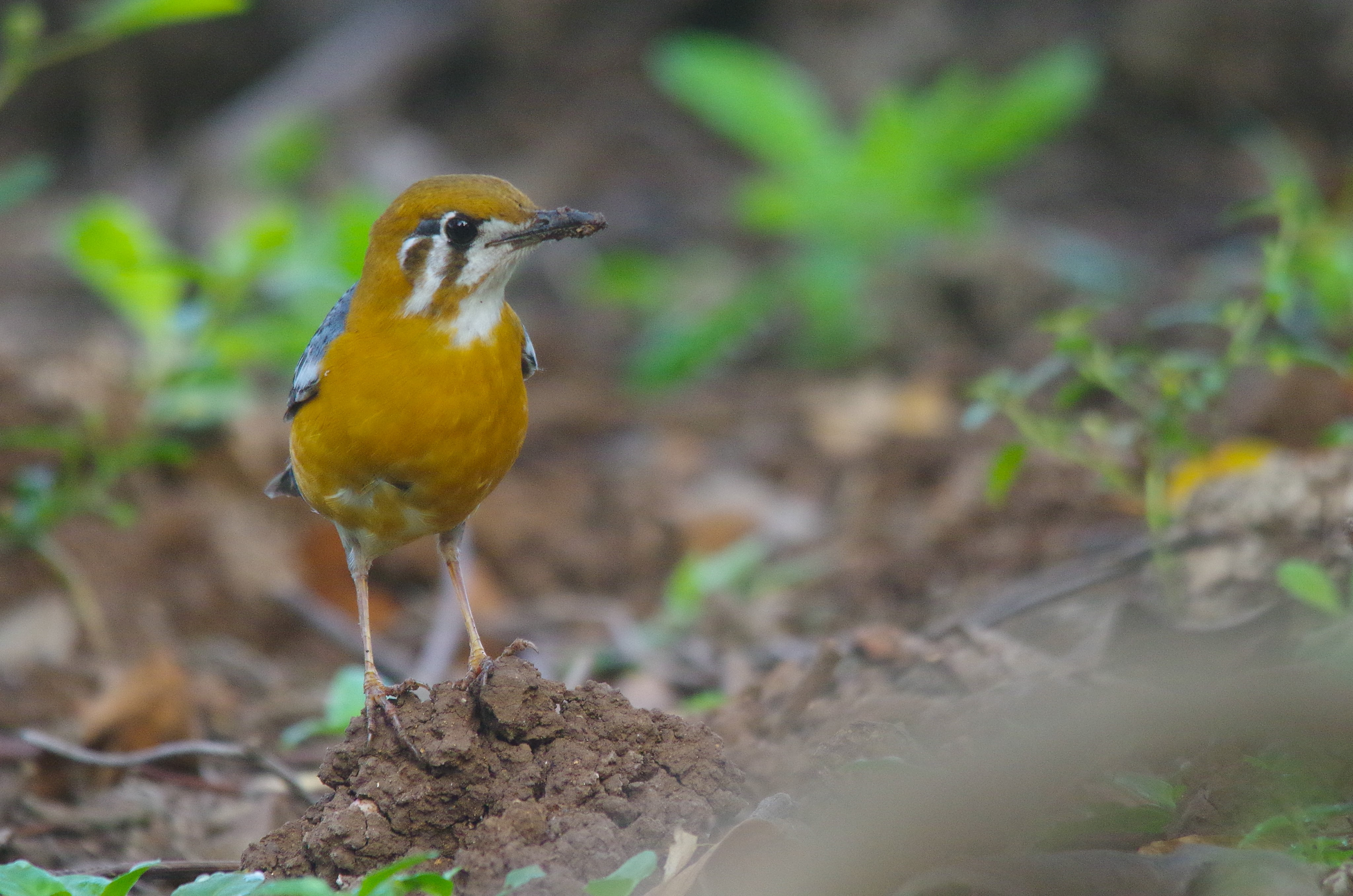
Orange-headed thrush ssp. cyanota in Sanjay Gandhi National Park, India

The orange-headed thrush (Geokichla citrina) is a bird in the thrush family.

It is common in well-wooded areas of the Indian subcontinent and Southeast Asia. Most populations are resident. The species shows a preference for shady damp areas, and like many Geokichla and Zoothera thrushes, can be quite secretive.

The orange-headed thrush is omnivorous, eating a wide range of insects, earthworms and fruit. It nests in trees but does not form flocks.

The male of this small thrush has uniform grey upperparts, and an orange head and underparts. The females and young birds have browner upper parts.

== Taxonomy ==
This species was first described by John Latham in 1790 as Turdus citrinus, the species name meaning "citrine" and referencing the colour of the head and underparts. It has about 12 subspecies. Rasmussen and Anderton (2005) suggest that this complex may consist of more than one species.

- G. c. citrina, the nominate subspecies breeds from northern India east along the Himalayas to eastern Bangladesh and possibly in western and northern Burma. It winters further south in India, Sri Lanka and Bangladesh.
- G. c. cyanota is mainly resident in Peninsular India south to Kerala. It has a white throat and face sides, with two black stripes running downwards from below the eyes. The spelling emendation cyanota is suggested by Rasmussen and Anderton.
- G. c. amadoni (not always recognized) found in northeastern part of peninsular India (Madhya Pradesh and Orissa) has brighter orange crown and longer wings than cyanota.
- G. c. innotata breeds through most of South-East Asia from southern Burma and southwestern China to northwest Thailand, central and southern Laos, Cambodia and southern Vietnam. It winter further south in southern Burma, and much of the rest of Thailand into Malaysia. It is very similar to the nominate but the male is brighter or deeper orange and lacks white tips to the median coverts; the female is duller on head and underparts, with an olive tinge to the grey of the mantle and back.
- G. c. melli breeds in southeastern China, and is partially migratory, regularly wintering in Hong Kong.
- G. c. courtoisi breeds in eastern-central China; its wintering range is unknown.
- G. c. aurimacula breeds in southern Vietnam, Hainan and possibly northern Laos. It resembles G. c. cyanota, but with a less defined head pattern. The face and neck-sides are whitish but flecked with orange or brownish and with weaker face stripes. The orange breast and flanks become paler orange on the belly and lower flanks.
- G. c. andamensis is resident in the Andaman Islands.
- G. c. albogularis is resident in the Nicobar Islands.
- G. c. gibsonhilli breeds from southern Burma to southern Thailand, and winters further south at lower levels in Peninsular Thailand, on islands in the Gulf of Thailand, and into Malaysia. It is similar to the nominate subspecies, but averages slightly brighter or deeper orange on head and upperparts and also has a slightly longer, heavier bill, and white tips to the median coverts.
- G. c. aurata is resident in the mountains of northern Borneo.
- G. c. rubecula is resident in Western Java.
- G. c. orientis is resident in Eastern Java and Bali and intergrades with G. c. rubecula in the west of its range. The separation of this form from the western Javan subspecies has been questioned.

=== Measurements ===
The following table summarises selected physical measurements for those subspecies for which data is available.

Subspecies	Measurements (mm)		
Subspecies	Length	Head	Tail
G. c. citrina	162-168	46-48	76-81
G. c. cyanota	165-170	42-46	74-79
G. c. andamanensis	150-158	43-45	65-78
G. c. albogularis	155-165	44-48	68-79

== Distribution and habitat ==
The orange-headed thrush breeds in much of the Indian subcontinent, including Bangladesh, India and Sri Lanka, and through Southeast Asia to Java and southern China. Its habitat is moist broadleaved evergreen woodlands, with a medium-density undergrowth of bushes and ferns, but it also utilises bamboo forests for secondary growth. G. c. cyanota also occurs in large gardens and orchards.

This species is often found in damp areas, near streams or in shady ravines. It occurs between 250 and 1830 metres (825– 6040 ft) in the Himalayas and up to about 1500 metres (5000 ft) in Malaysia, Thailand and Java. G. c. aurata is resident between 1000 and 1630 metres (3300–5400 ft) on Mt Kinabalu and Mt Trus Madi, northern Borneo. Some of the subspecies are completely or partially migratory; their wintering habitat is similar to the breeding forests, but more likely to be at lower altitudes.

== Description ==
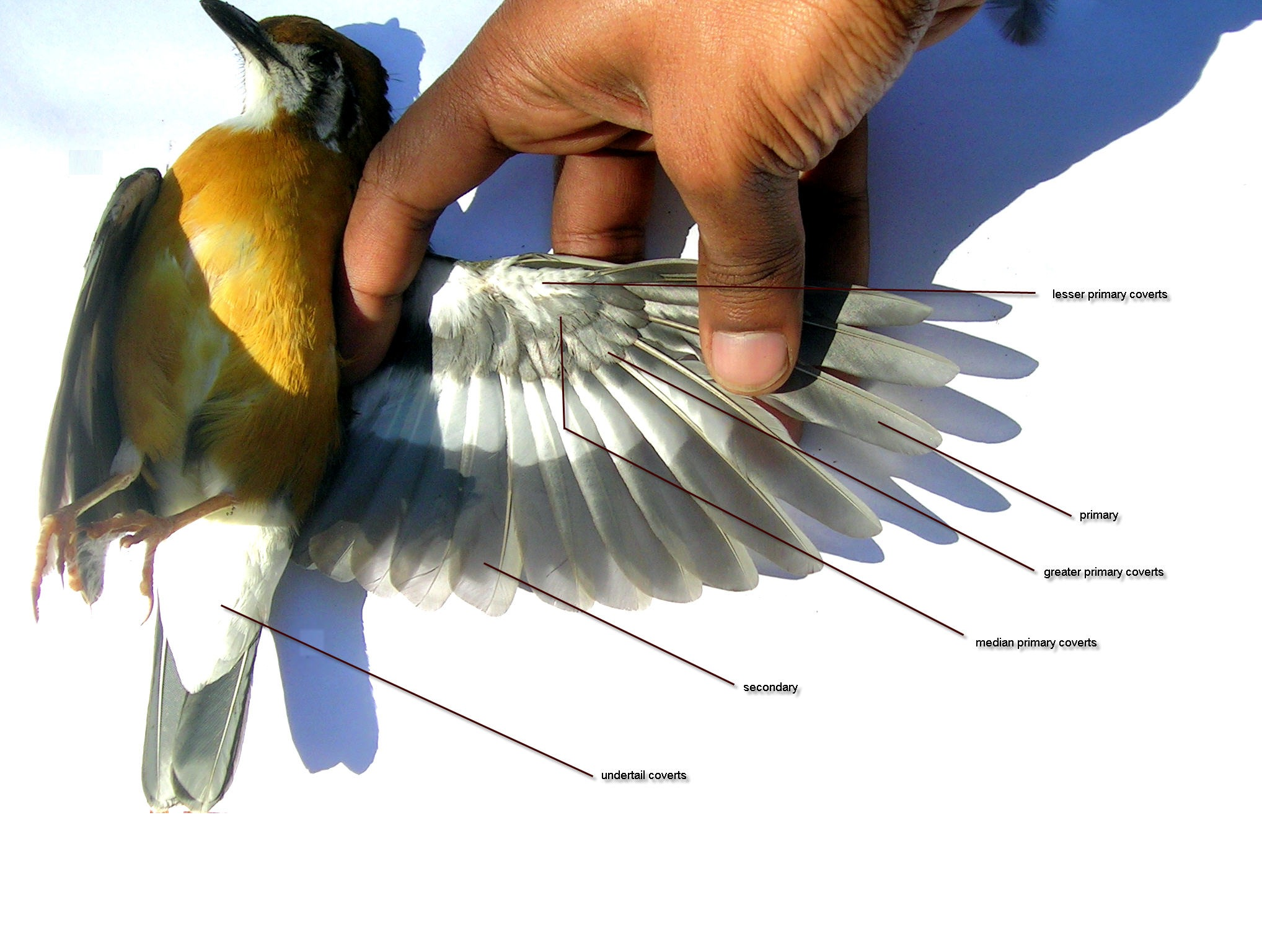
Underwing of G. c. cyanota

The orange-headed thrush is 205–235 mm (8.1–9.25 in) long and weighs 47–60 g (1.7–2.1 oz). The adult male of the nominate subspecies of this small thrush has an entirely orange head and underparts, uniformly grey upperparts and wings, and white median and undertail coverts. It has a slate-coloured bill and the legs and feet have brown fronts and pink or yellowish rears.

The female resembles the male but has browner or more olive upperparts and warm brown wings, but some old females are almost identical to the male. The juvenile is dull brown with buff streaks on its back, and a rufous tone to the head and face; it has grey wings. The bill is brownish horn, and the legs and feet are brown.

This species' orange and grey plumage is very distinctive, and it is unlikely to be confused with any other species. Differences between the subspecies, as described above, can be quite striking, as with the strong head pattern on G. c. cyanota, but may be less obvious variations in plumage tone, or whether there is white on the folded wing. As with many other thrushes, all forms of this species shows a distinctive underwing pattern, with a strong white band.

=== Voice ===
Calls of the orange-headed thrush include a soft chuk or tchuk, a screeching teer-teer-teer, and a thin tsee or dzef given in flight. However, this bird is generally silent especially in winter. The song is a loud clear series of variably sweet lilting musical notes, recalling the quality of the common blackbird, but with the more repetitive structure of the song thrush. It also includes imitations of other birds like bulbuls, babblers and common tailorbird. It sings from a perch in a leafy tree, mostly early morning and late afternoon.

== Behaviour ==
The orange-headed thrush is a shy, secretive bird usually occurring alone or in pairs, but is comparatively more easily seen than many other Geokichla thrushes, and several birds may congregate outside the breeding season at a good food source. It has a swift, silent flight, but when disturbed will often sit motionless until the threat has passed.

=== Breeding ===
The nest, built by both sexes, is a wide but shallow cup of twigs, bracken and rootlets lined with softer plant material like leaves, moss and conifer needles. It is constructed at a height of up to 4.5 metres (15 ft) in a small tree or bush, with mango trees and coffee bushes being preferred. Three or four, occasionally five, eggs are laid; they are cream or tinted with pale blue, grey or green, and have pale lilac blotches and reddish brown spots. They are incubated for 13–14 days to hatching, with another 12 days until the young birds leave the nest.

This species is a host of the pied cuckoo, Clamator jacobinus, a brood parasite which lay a single egg in the nest. Unlike the common cuckoo, neither the hen nor the hatched chick evict the host's eggs, but the host's young often die because they cannot compete successfully with the cuckoo for food. The chestnut-winged cuckoo, Clamator coromandus, and, very rarely, the common cuckoo, Cuculus canorus have also been claimed as parasites on this species.

=== Feeding ===
The orange-headed thrush feeds on the ground in dense undergrowth or other thick cover. It is most active at dawn and dusk, probing the leaf litter for insects and their larvae, spiders, other invertebrates and fruit. In Malaysia, wintering birds regularly feed on figs.

== Status ==
The orange-headed thrush has an extensive range, estimated at 2,780,000 square kilometres (1,070,000 sq mi). The population size has not been quantified, but it is believed to be large due to its extensive range; it also reported as being locally common. The species is not believed to approach the thresholds for the global population decline criterion of the IUCN Red List (i.e., declining more than 30% in ten years or three generations), and is therefore evaluated as Least Concern.

It is very popular as cage-bird on Java, and numbers have severely declined in recent years owing to trapping for aviculture. Against the trend in Southeast Asia where loss or fragmentation of woodland poses a threat to forest birds, the orange-headed thrush has colonized Hong Kong, where it was first recorded in 1956, thanks to forest maturation.

== Gallery ==
At Khao Yai National Park, Thailand

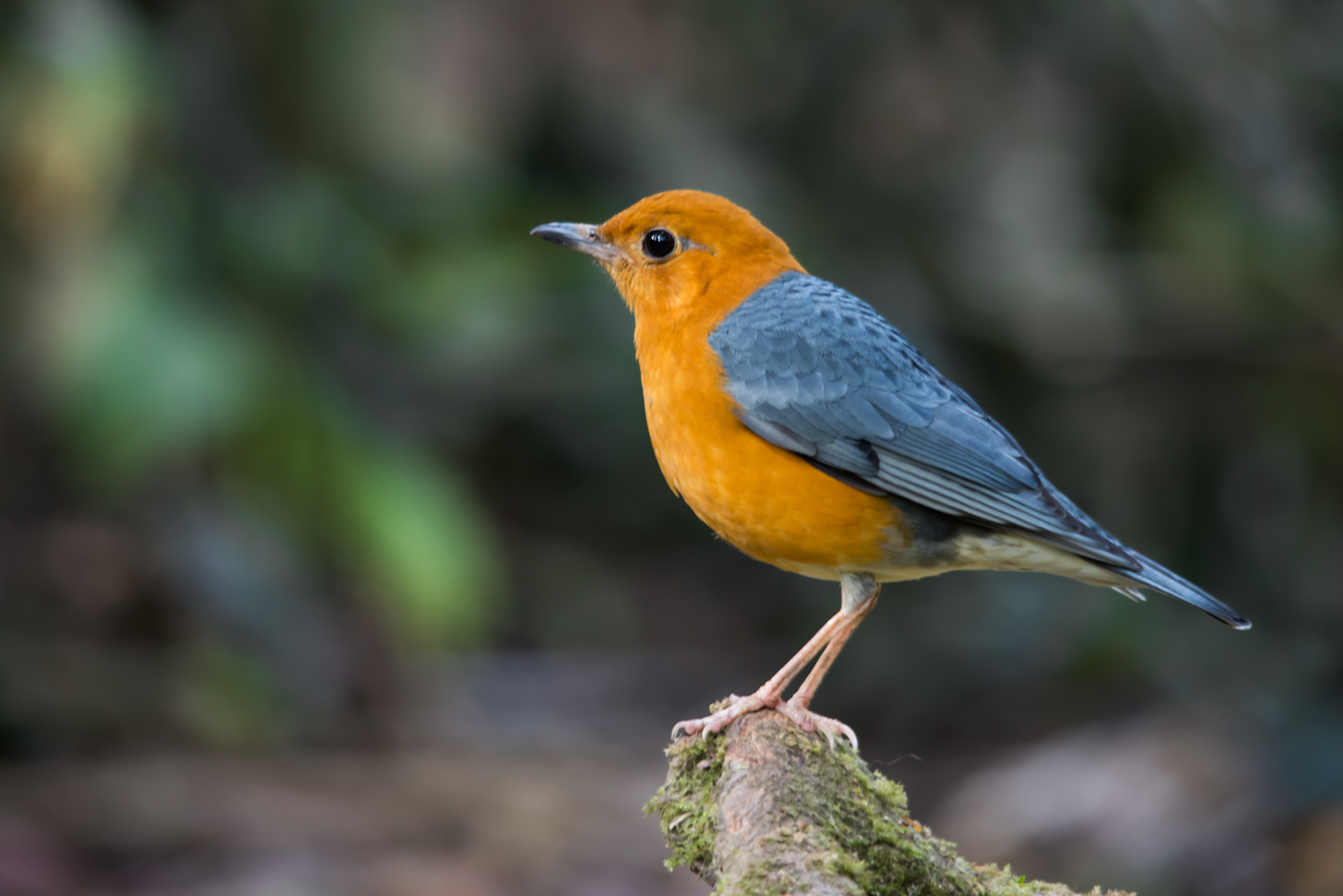
At Khao Yai National Park, Thailand

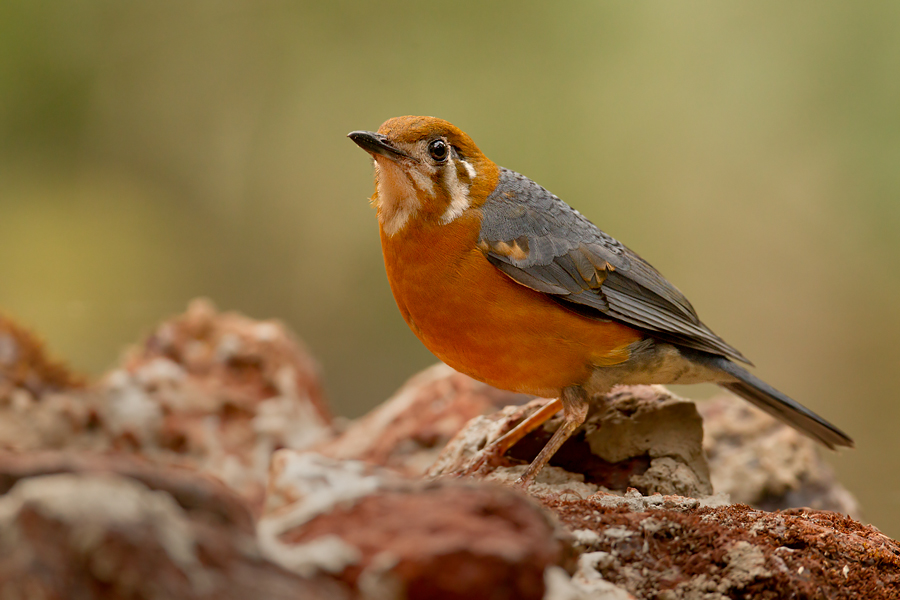
An orange-headed thrush (ssp. cyanota) at Dandeli Wildlife Sanctuary, India

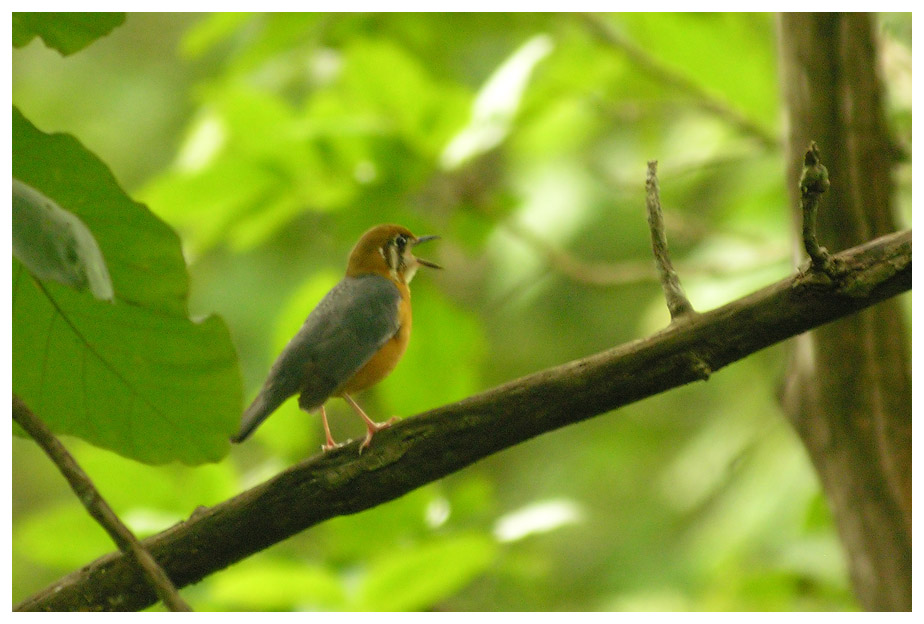
An orange-headed thrush (ssp. cyanota) at Bhadra Wildlife Sanctuary, India

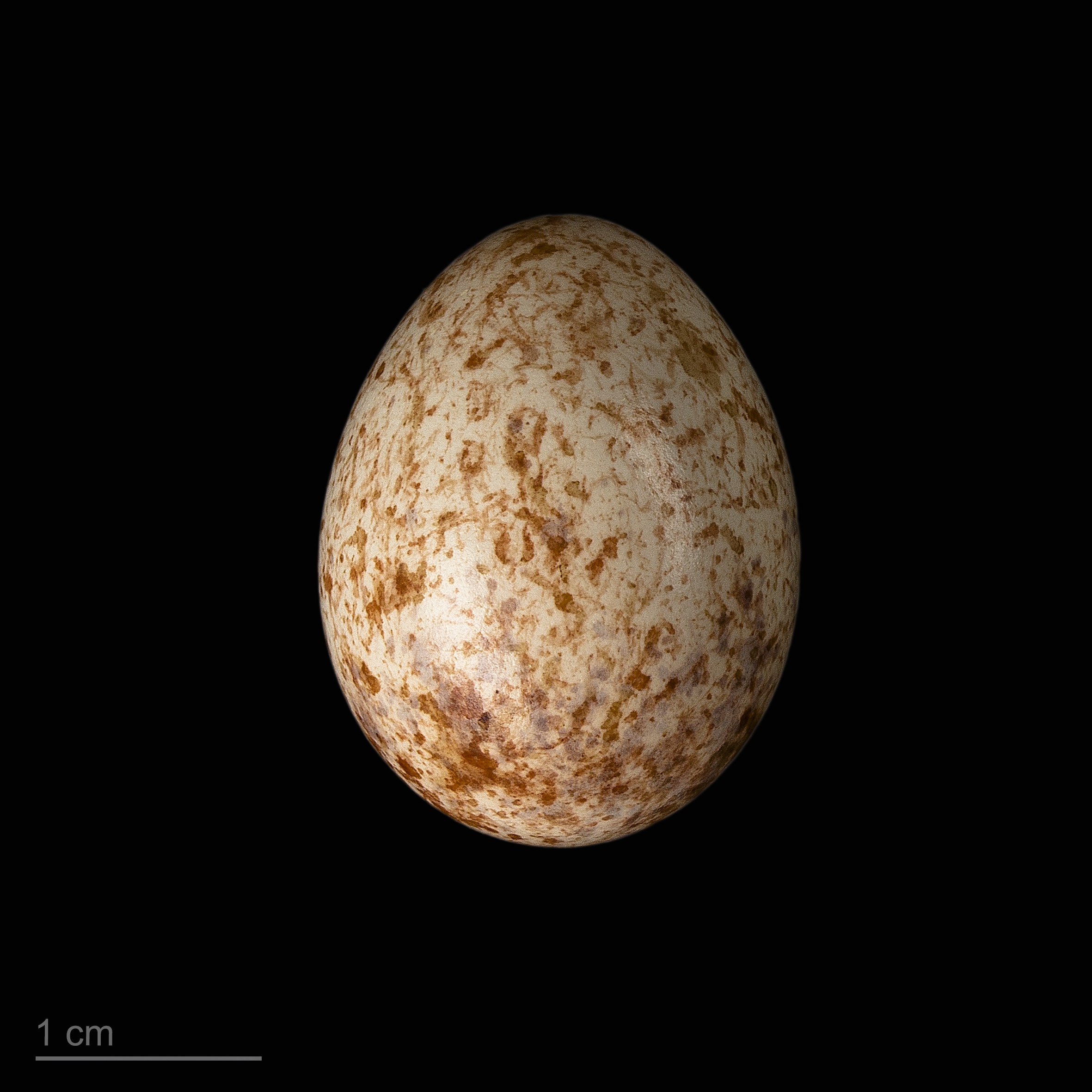
Geokichla citrina - MHNT
