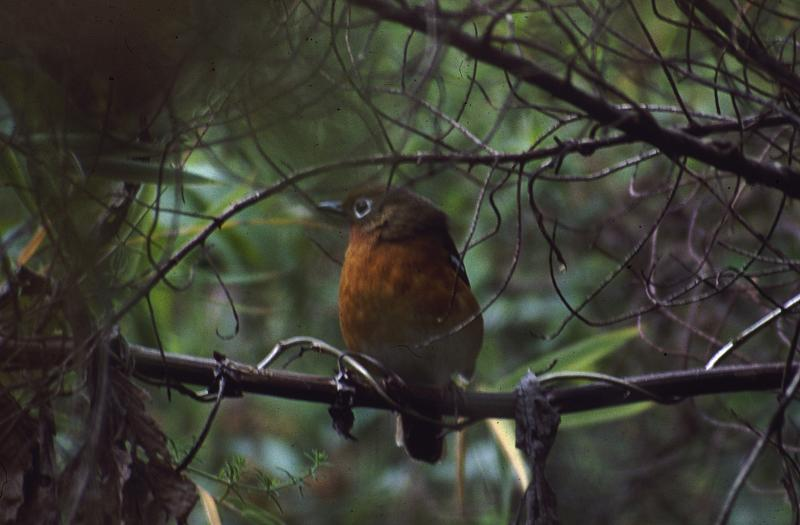
- Photographed in Kenya

Conservation status
- Least Concern (IUCN 3.1)

Scientific classification
- Kingdom: Animalia
- Phylum: Chordata
- Class: Aves
- Order: Passeriformes
- Family: Turdidae
- Genus: Geokichla
- Species: G. piaggiae

Binomial name
- Geokichla piaggiae (Bouvier, 1877)

Synonyms
- Turdus piaggiae Bouvier, 1877; Zoothera piaggiae (Bouvier, 1877); Zoothera piaggii (Bouvier, 1877)

= Abyssinian ground thrush =

Species of bird

The Abyssinian ground thrush (Geokichla piaggiae) is a thrush from the family Turdidae which is native to north-east Africa where it lives at high altitude in montane forests. Its binomial nomenclature honors the 19th century Italian explorer of East Africa Carlo Piaggia.

== Description ==
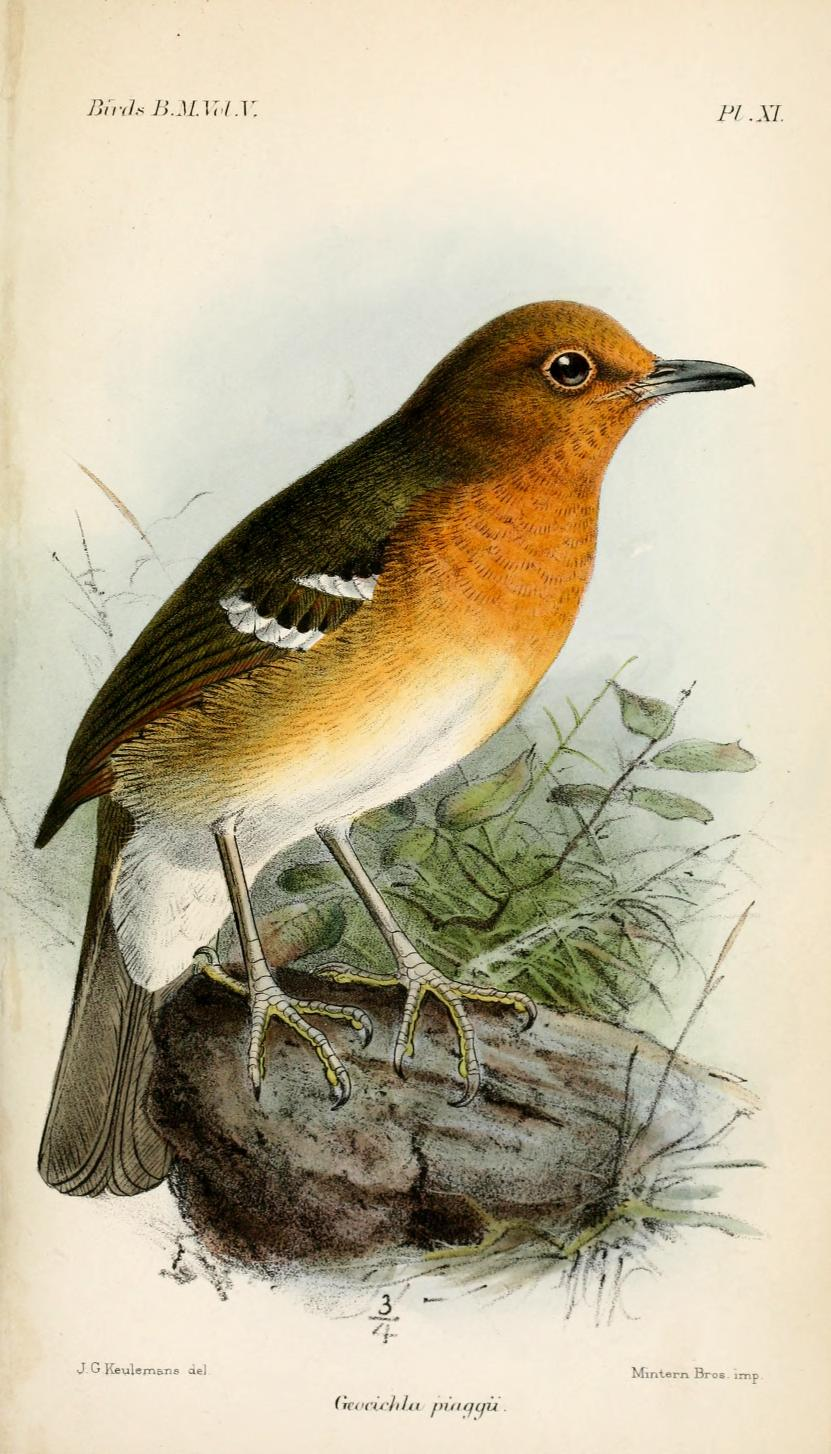
Illustration by Keulemans, 1881

The Abyssinian ground thrush is an attractive but rather secretive species. The adults are a deep rufous orange on the head and face with a distinct white eye ring, the orange colour becomes les rufous on the breast and flanks and the upperparts are olive brown except for the orange-brown rump and tail. On the folded wing it shows two prominent white wingbars from the tips to the coverts. Immature birds tend to be paler and duller than the adults. They measure 19–20 cm (7.5–7.9 in) in length and weigh 43–65 g (1.5–2.3 oz).

=== Voice ===
The contact call of the Abyssinian ground thrush is a high pitched "tseep", the song is a typical thrush like melodious series of whistled phrases rendered in Sinclair & Ryan as "chee-cheeleeroo-chruup".

== Distribution and subspecies ==
There are six currently recognised subspecies of Abyssinian ground thrush and they are listed below with their distributions:

- Geokichla piaggiae hadii (Macdonald, 1940): South Sudan in the Imatong and Dongotona Mountains.
- Geokichla piaggiae piaggiae (Bouvier, 1877): eastern South Sudan in the Boma Plateau and Ethiopia south to eastern Democratic Republic of Congo and northern and western Kenya.
- Geokichla piaggiae ruwenzorii (Prigogine, 1985): Ruwenzori Mountains in western Uganda.
- Geokichla piaggiae tanganjicae (Sassi, 1914): Eastern Democratic Republic of Congo, south western Uganda, Rwanda and northern Burundi.
- Geokichla piaggiae kilimensis (Neumann, 1900): Central and southern Kenya and northern Tanzania.
- Geokichla piaggiae rowei (C. H. B. Grant & Mackworth-Praed, 1937): Northern Tanzania.

== Habitat ==
The Abyssinian ground thrush occurs in the undergrowth of evergreen montane forest in high rainfall regions between 1,800 and 3,300 m (5,910 and 10,830 ft), mostly above 2,500 m (8,200 ft), although occasionally found lower. It may also occur in bamboo forest, e.g. on Mount Kenya, or in exotic pine plantations in Ethiopia.

== Habits ==
The Abyssinian ground thrush is shy and solitary bird which forages on the ground where it hops, runs or walks under trees or dense vegetation. It will feed higher up in fruiting bushes or trees. It is frequently found near forest streams in moss and lichen covered areas and may also frequent the edges of clearings or paths. It quickly goes to hide in cover if danger threatens. Its food is mainly earthworms, millipedes, snails and insects which it searches for in the leaf litter; it will also follow ant swarms and catch invertebrates fleeing the ants and it feeds on fruit such as figs, berries and some seeds.

Abyssinian ground thrushes breed during the rainy season which varies through their range. The nest is a cup of moss or other plant material lined with plant fibres and is usually situated below 5m above the ground in the fork of a branch or sapling and is well hidden. Two eggs are laid, the young are fed by both parents and after fledging they remain with their parents for up to three months.

== Taxonomy ==
This thrush has been placed in the genera Turdus, then Zoothera but is now placed in the Geokichla. In addition the subspecies G.p. tanganjicae and G.p kilimensis have sometimes been regarded as separate species but they do not differ very much from the other subspecies in voice or morphology and most authorities lump them with Abyssinian ground thrush.
