= Plain-backed thrush =

Plain-backed thrush is a common name for a broad species concept of Zoothera Mollissima. The bird has been split into the following species:

- Alpine thrush, Zoothera Mollissima
- Sichuan thrush, Zoothera Griseiceps
- Himalayan thrush, Zoothera Salimalii
