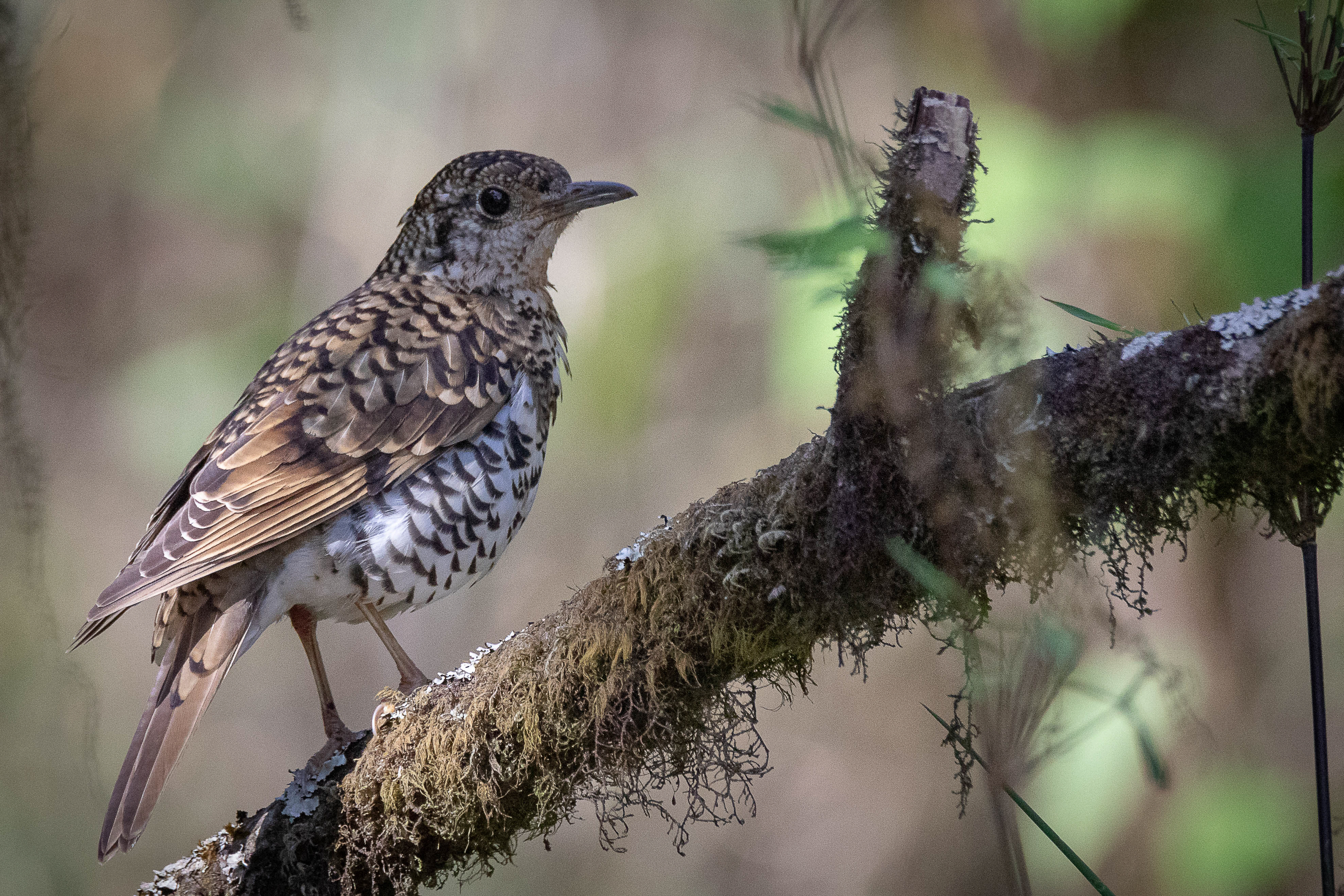
- Nominate Z. d. dauma at Godwari, Kathmandu, Nepal

Conservation status
- Least Concern (IUCN 3.1)

Scientific classification
- Kingdom: Animalia
- Phylum: Chordata
- Class: Aves
- Order: Passeriformes
- Family: Turdidae
- Genus: Zoothera
- Species: Z. dauma

Binomial name
- Zoothera dauma (Latham, 1790)

Synonyms
- Geocichla horsfieldi

= Scaly thrush =

Species of bird

The scaly thrush (Zoothera dauma) is a member of the thrush family Turdidae.

== Distribution and habitat ==
It breeds in dense wet forests in the Himalayas east through southwestern China to northern Indochina, and with disjunct populations (but possibly separate species) on Iriomote Island off southern Japan, and on Sumatra and Java in Indonesia.

== Description ==
The sexes are similar, 27–31 cm long, with black scaling on a paler white or yellowish background. The most striking identification feature in flight is the black band on the white underwings, a feature shared with most other species in the genus Zoothera, and also Siberian thrush in the genus Geokichla. The male has a song which is a loud, far-carrying mechanical whistle, with 5-10 second pauses between each one second long phrase twee...tuuu....tuuu....tuuu.

== Taxonomy ==
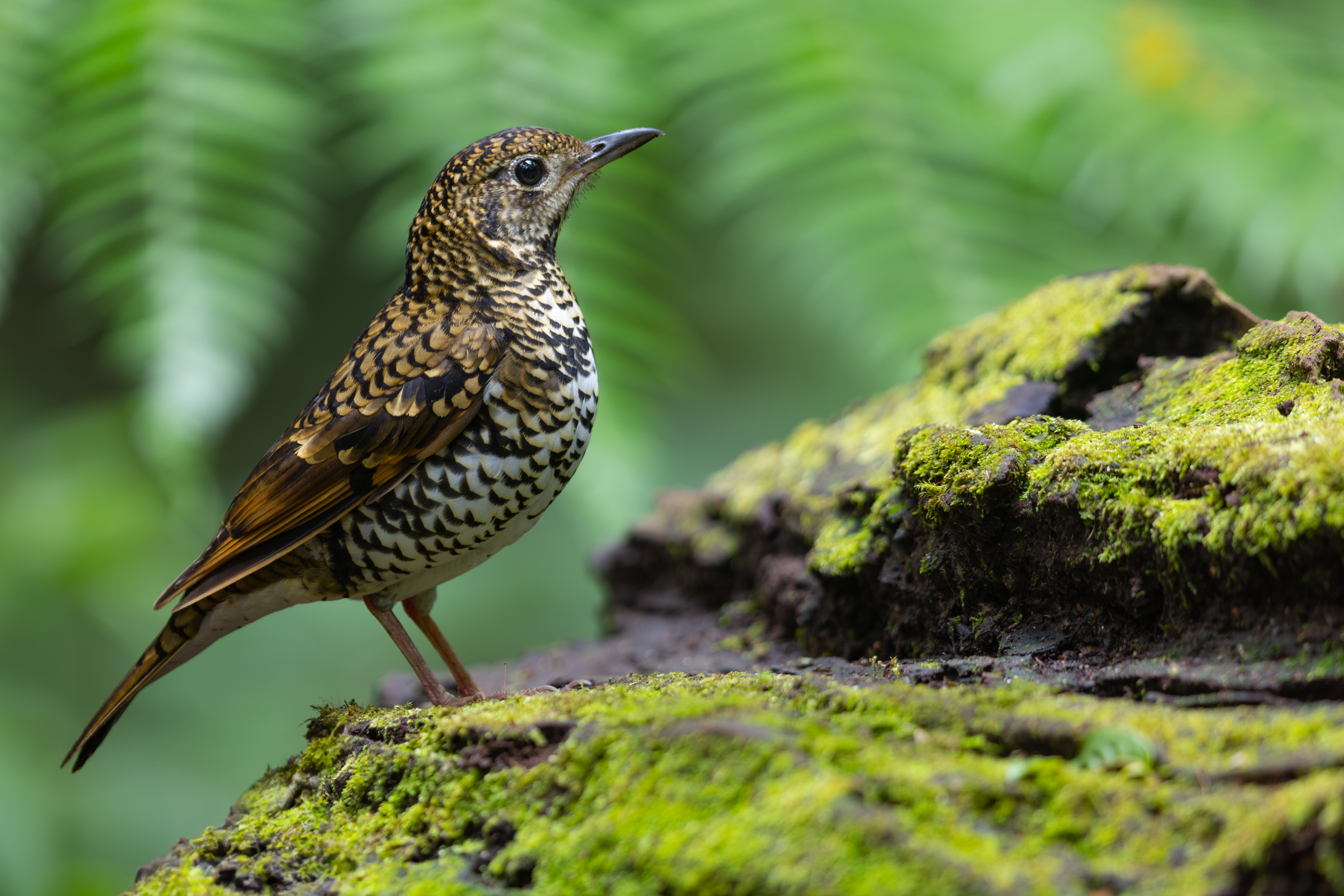
Z. d. horsfieldi, eastern Java, Indonesia

Three subspecies are currently accepted:

- Z. d. dauma — Himalayas east to southwest China, south to northern Thailand; a short-distance altitudinal migrant, dropping to foothills in winter
- Z. d. horsfieldi — Sumatra, Java, Bali, Lombok and Sumbawa; resident
- Z. d. iriomotensis — Iriomote Island; resident

Several other similar thrushes which were formerly treated as further subspecies are now split off as separate species:

- Z. aurea (White's thrush), including the subspecies Z. a. toratugumi, is a migratory bird from Siberia and north-east Asia, wintering in southeast Asia
- Z. neilgherriensis (Nilgiri thrush) is resident in the hills of southwest India
- Z. imbricata (Sri Lanka thrush) is endemic to the hills of Sri Lanka and is particularly distinctive, being smaller, long-billed and rufous below
- Z. major (Amami thrush) is restricted to the Amami Islands in Japan
- Z. machiki (fawn-breasted thrush) in the Lesser Sunda Islands in eastern Indonesia
- Z. lunulata (Bassian thrush) in eastern Australia
- Z. heinei (russet-tailed thrush) in eastern Australia

== Behaviour ==
The scaly thrush is very secretive, preferring dense cover. It nests in trees, laying three or four dull green eggs in a neat cup nest. It is omnivorous, eating a wide range of insects, earthworms and berries.
