= White-bellied thrush =

The white-bellied thrush has been split into the following species:

- Makira thrush, Zoothera margaretae
- Guadalcanal thrush, Zoothera turipavae
