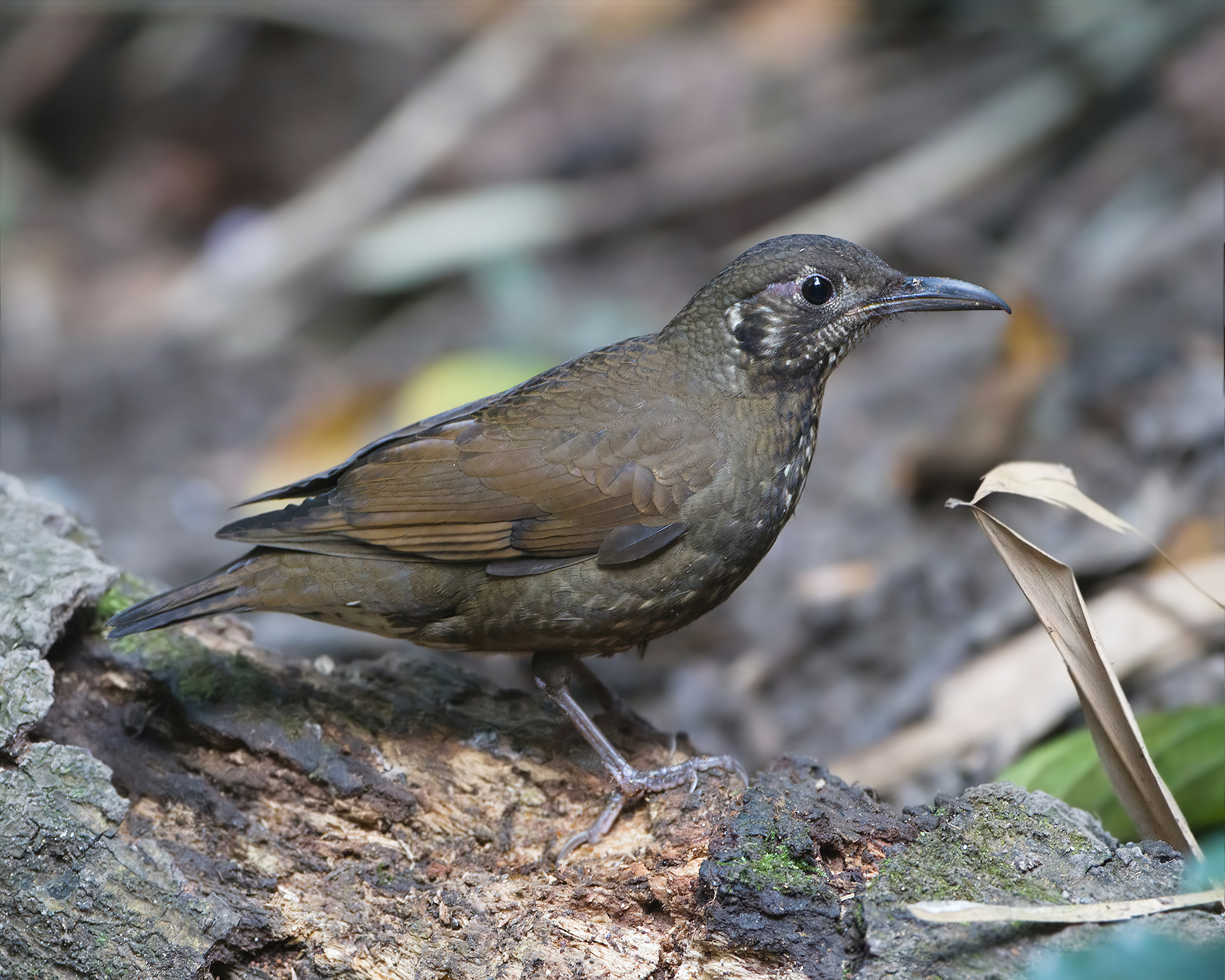

Conservation status
- Least Concern (IUCN 3.1)

Scientific classification
- Kingdom: Animalia
- Phylum: Chordata
- Class: Aves
- Order: Passeriformes
- Family: Turdidae
- Genus: Zoothera
- Species: Z. marginata

Binomial name
- Zoothera marginata Blyth, 1847

= Dark-sided thrush =

Species of bird

The dark-sided thrush (Zoothera marginata) is a species of bird in the thrush family Turdidae. It is also known as the lesser brown thrush, the long-billed ground-thrush, and the dark-sided ground-thrush. The species is monotypic (lacking subspecies) and is closely related to a number of thrushes in the genus Zoothera, including the long-billed thrush and the widespread scaly thrush. It was described by Edward Blyth in 1847 based upon a specimen collected in Rakhine in Burma (Myanmar).

== Description ==
The dark-sided thrush is 24 to 25 cm (9.4–9.8 in) in length and weighs around 80 g (2.8 oz). It has a particularly long blackish bill and the plumage is a contrasting dark brown head with rufous-brown wings. The face has a white loral stripe and a white eyering with a whitish throat and chin. The call is a series of monotone thin whistles.

== Distribution and habitat ==
The species has a discontinuous distribution in the eastern Himalayas, and then a population in the higher areas of Burma, northern Thailand, Laos, Vietnam and the extreme south of China. The species is generally non-migratory but will move down from higher altitudes in winter, and has turned up as a vagrant in Bangladesh. It ranges from 750 to 2,100 m (2,460–6,890 ft) in broadleaf forests, particularly in damp areas and around rocky streams, also in areas of reed and bamboo in these forests. The species is not common anywhere, but is potentially often overlooked due to its cryptic plumage and retiring behaviour.
