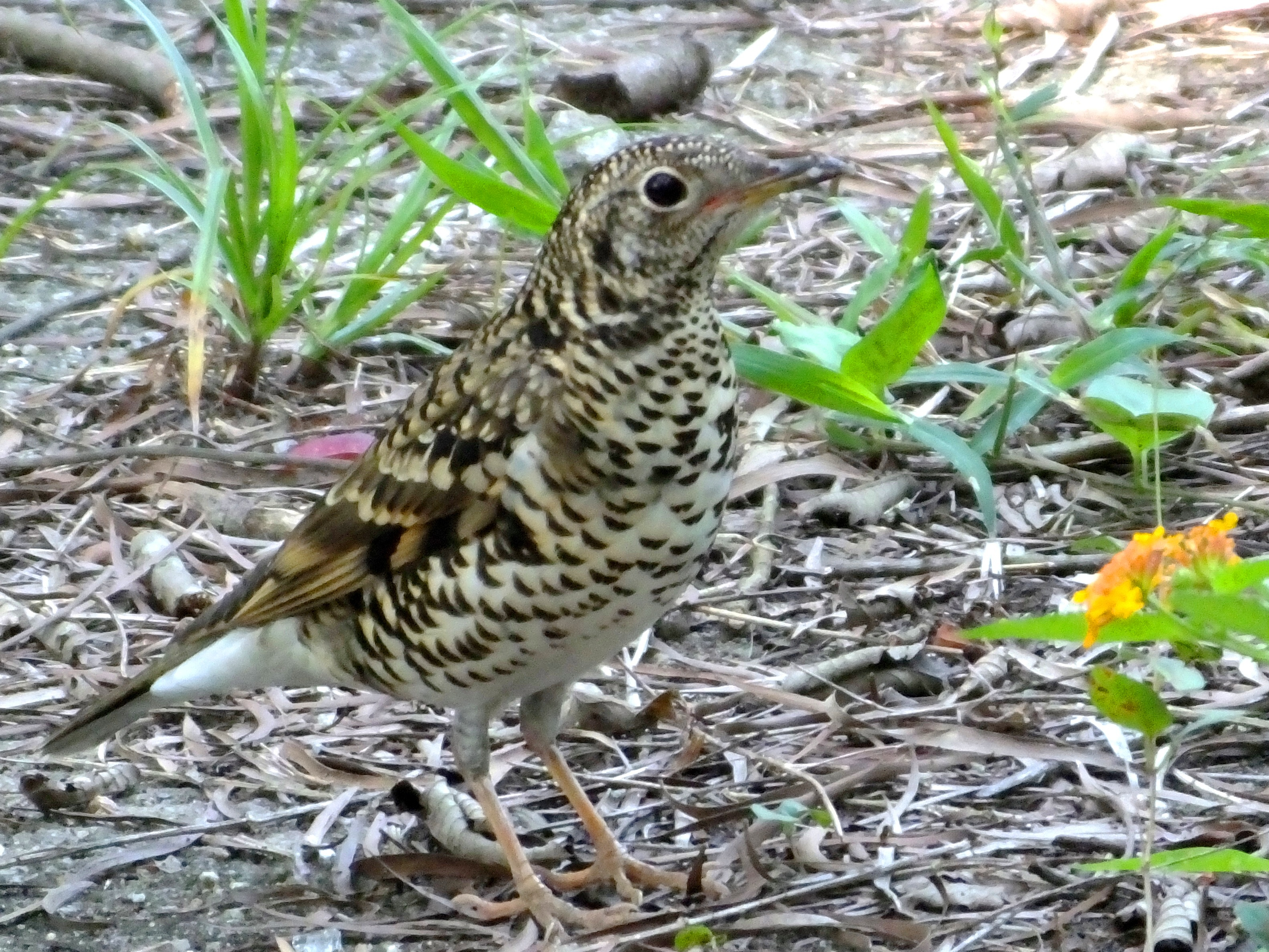

Conservation status
- Least Concern (IUCN 3.1)

Scientific classification
- Kingdom: Animalia
- Phylum: Chordata
- Class: Aves
- Order: Passeriformes
- Family: Turdidae
- Genus: Zoothera
- Species: Z. aurea

Binomial name
- Zoothera aurea (Holandre, 1825)

Synonyms
- Zoothera dauma aurea

= White's thrush =

Species of bird

White's thrush (Zoothera aurea) is a member of the thrush family, Turdidae. It was named after the English naturalist Gilbert White. The genus name Zoothera comes from the Ancient Greek zoon, "animal" and theras, "hunter". The specific aurea is from Latin aureus, "golden".

== Distribution and habitat ==
It breeds in wet coniferous taiga, mainly in the eastern Palearctic in Siberia to Manchuria, Korea and Japan. Northern races are strongly migratory, with most birds moving to southeastern Asia during the winter. It is a very rare vagrant to western Europe.

== Description ==
The sexes are similar, 27–31 cm long, with black scaling on a paler white or yellowish background. The most striking identification feature in flight is the black band on the white underwings, a feature shared with Siberian thrush. The male has a song which is a loud, far-carrying mechanical whistle, with 5–10 second pauses between each one second long phrase twee...tuuu....tuuu....tuuu.

It was previously considered a subspecies of the scaly thrush.
