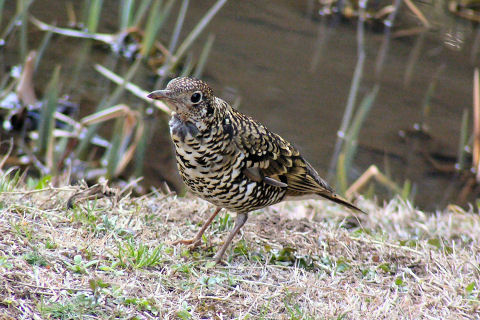
- White's thrush (Zoothera aurea)

Scientific classification
- Kingdom: Animalia
- Phylum: Chordata
- Class: Aves
- Order: Passeriformes
- Family: Turdidae
- Genus: Zoothera; Vigors, 1832

Species
- 21, see text

= Asian thrush =

Asian thrushes

Genus of birds

The Asian thrushes are medium-sized mostly insectivorous or omnivorous birds in the genus Zoothera of the thrush family, Turdidae.

== Taxonomy ==
The genus Zoothera was introduced in 1832 by the Irish zoologist Nicholas Vigors to accommodate a newly described species, Zoothera monticol, the long-billed thrush, which therefore becomes the type species. The genus name combines the Ancient Greek zōon meaning "animal" with -thēra meaning "hunter".

Two New World species traditionally regarded as Zoothera (varied thrush and Aztec thrush) actually belong elsewhere in the thrush family. A group containing Siberian thrush and the African species is not closely related to the other Zoothera and are now assigned to the genus Geokichla.

== Species ==
The genus contains the following 22 species:

Image	Common name	Scientific name
	Long-tailed thrush	Zoothera dixoni
	Alpine thrush	Zoothera mollissima
	Himalayan thrush	Zoothera salimalii
	Sichuan thrush	Zoothera griseiceps
	Long-billed thrush	Zoothera monticola
	Geomalia	Zoothera heinrichi
	Dark-sided thrush	Zoothera marginata
	Everett's thrush	Zoothera everetti
	Sunda thrush	Zoothera andromedae
	White's thrush	Zoothera aurea
	Scaly thrush	Zoothera dauma
	Nilgiri thrush	Zoothera neilgherriensis
	Sri Lanka thrush	Zoothera imbricata
	Amami thrush	Zoothera major
	† Bonin thrush	Zoothera terrestris - extinct (c. 1830s)
	Guadalcanal thrush	Zoothera turipavae
	Makira thrush	Zoothera margaretae
	Russet-tailed thrush	Zoothera heinei
	Fawn-breasted thrush	Zoothera machiki
	Bassian thrush	Zoothera lunulata
	Bougainville thrush	Zoothera atrigena (split from Zoothera talaseae)
	New Britain thrush	Zoothera talaseae

== Traditional Zoothera species belonging elsewhere in family ==
- Varied thrush (Ixoreus naevius) - related to other new world genera
- Aztec thrush (Ridgwayia pinicola) - related to Hylocichla

Geokichla thrushes

- Siberian thrush, Geokichla sibirica
- Pied thrush, Geokichla wardii
- Grey ground thrush, Geokichla princei
- Black-eared ground thrush, Geokichla camaronensis
- Spotted ground thrush, Geokichla guttata - formerly G. fischeri
- Spot-winged thrush, Geokichla spiloptera
- Crossley's ground thrush, Geokichla crossleyi
- Abyssinian ground thrush, Geokichla piaggiae
  - Kivu ground thrush, Geokichla piaggiae tanganjicae
- Oberländer's ground thrush, Geokichla oberlaenderi
- Orange ground thrush, Geokichla gurneyi
- Orange-headed thrush, Geokichla citrina
- Buru thrush, Geokichla dumasi
- Seram thrush, Geokichla joiceyi
- Orange-sided thrush, Geokichla peronii
- Slaty-backed thrush, Geokichla schistacea
- Chestnut-capped thrush, Geokichla interpres
- Enggano thrush, Geokichla leucolaema
- Chestnut-backed thrush, Geokichla dohertyi
- Ashy thrush, Geokichla cinerea
- Red-backed thrush, Geokichla erythronota
- Red-and-black thrush, Geokichla mendeni
