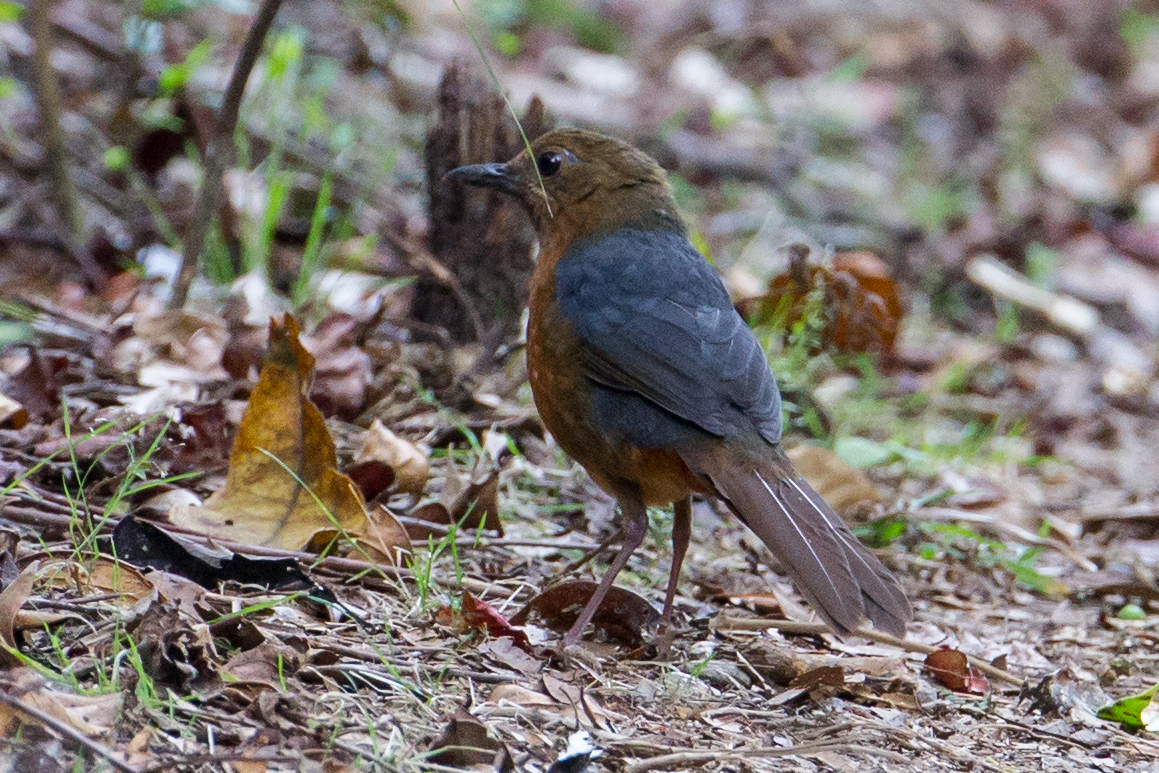

Conservation status
- Least Concern (IUCN 3.1)

Scientific classification
- Kingdom: Animalia
- Phylum: Chordata
- Class: Aves
- Order: Passeriformes
- Family: Turdidae
- Genus: Zoothera
- Species: Z. heinrichi

Binomial name
- Zoothera heinrichi (Stresemann, 1931)

Synonyms
- Geomalia heinrichi

= Geomalia =

Species of bird

Geomalia at Lore Lindu NP, Sulawesi

The geomalia or Sulawesi mountain thrush (Zoothera heinrichi) is a rare member of the thrush family endemic to Sulawesi in Indonesia. It is sometimes classified as Geomalia heinrichi, in which case it is monotypic in the genus Geomalia (which is the source of its primary common name).

The coloration of the bird is primarily dark brown with chestnut color on the breast. The long legs, long tail and short wings struck the discoverer as reminiscent of laughingthrushes, and the name Geomalia is itself a reference to another, superficially similar Sulawesi endemic, the malia, but the two species are not related. The specific name commemorates its discoverer, the German explorer Gerd Heinrich.

There has been some debate over the taxonomic affinities of the geomalia. While it has some features typical of thrushes (such as an upright posture, juveniles with spotted underparts, and thrush-like terrestrial foraging behavior), several others (such as its long, rounded tail; short wings; and apparent lack of a song) have led authors to question whether its placement in the thrush family is appropriate. A genetic study published in 2013 confirmed its placement in the family Turdidae, specifically as an aberrant member of the genus Zoothera.

Due to its isolation and the difficulty of getting to its habitat, the geomalia is little-studied. The species may be threatened by uncontrolled logging and other activities that cause degradation of the Sulawesi highlands, including the grounds of legally protected lands such as Lore Lindu National Park. It is listed as Near Threatened on the IUCN Red List.
