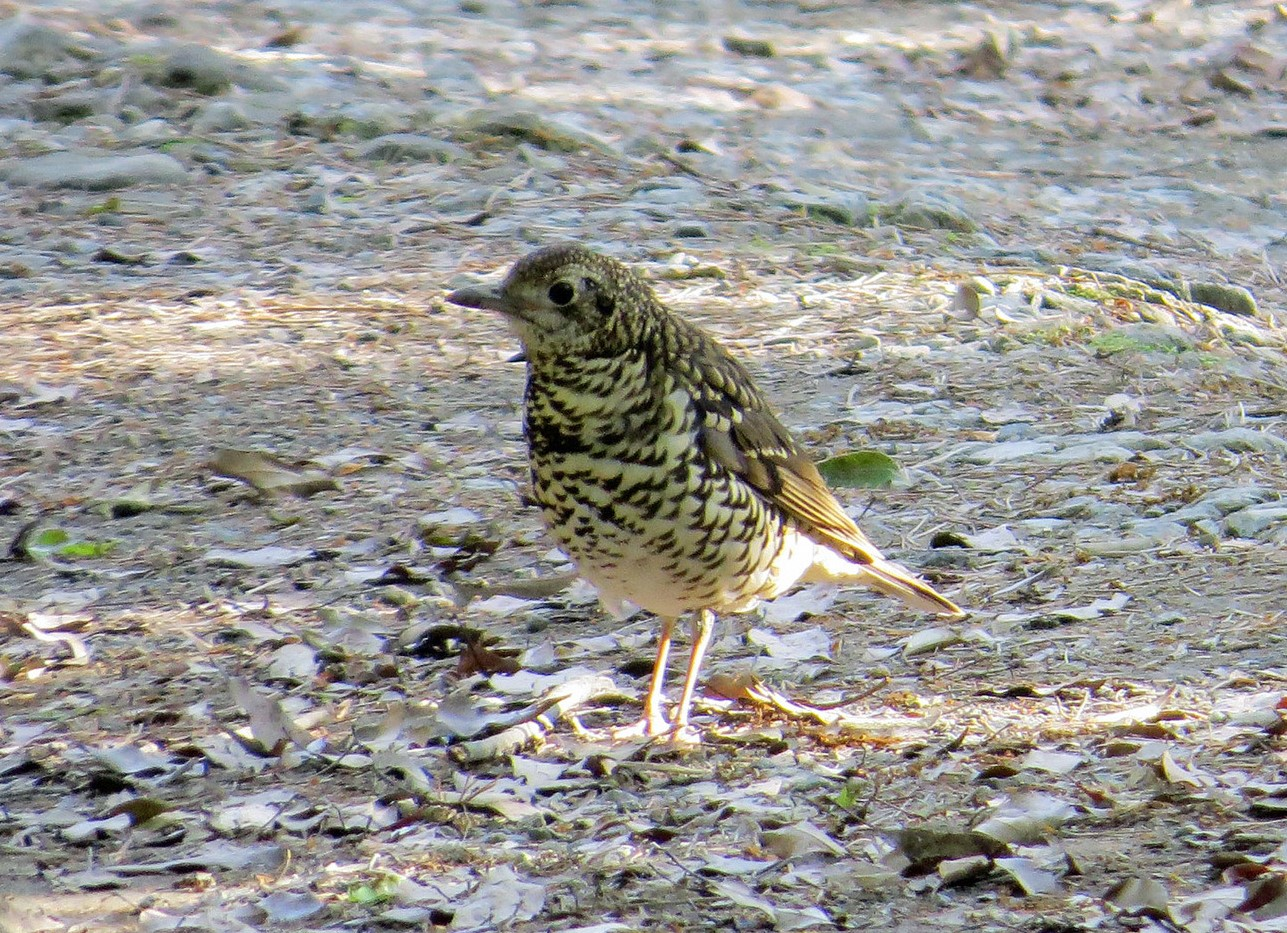

Conservation status
- Least Concern (IUCN 3.1)

Scientific classification
- Domain: Eukaryota
- Kingdom: Animalia
- Phylum: Chordata
- Class: Aves
- Order: Passeriformes
- Family: Turdidae
- Genus: Zoothera
- Species: Z. major

Binomial name
- Zoothera major (Ogawa, 1905)

Synonyms
- Geocichla major Ogawa, 1905; Zoothera amami; Zoothera dauma major (Ogawa, 1905); Zoothera varia major

= Amami thrush =

Species of bird

The Amami thrush (Zoothera major) is a member of the thrush family Turdidae. It is endemic to the islands of Amami Ōshima and Kakeroma island in the northern Nansei Islands of Japan.

== Description ==
This large, heavily patterned thrush is similar in appearance to the scaly thrush, to which was considered a subspecies. It has warm olive-brown to buff upperparts and whitish underparts with heavy black scaling. It has twelve tail feathers. The scaly thrush is smaller and has fourteen tail feathers. It has a cheerful song similar to the Siberian thrush. The Amami thrush ranges in length from 29 to 31 cm (11 to 12 in) and weighs approximately 172 g (6.1 oz). Among standard measurements, the wing chord is 16.4 to 17.3 cm (6.5 to 6.8 in), the bill is 3.1 to 3.3 cm (1.2 to 1.3 in) and the tarsus is 4.1 to 4.5 cm (1.6 to 1.8 in).

== Behaviour and ecology ==
Its breeding habitat is mature subtropical broadleaved evergreen forest around humid valleys. Its diet includes invertebrates and fruit. It breeds in May and June, laying 3-4 eggs.

== Status ==
The breeding population is estimated by Amami Ornithologists' Club (NPO, Japan) all over the island every late March since 1999.
