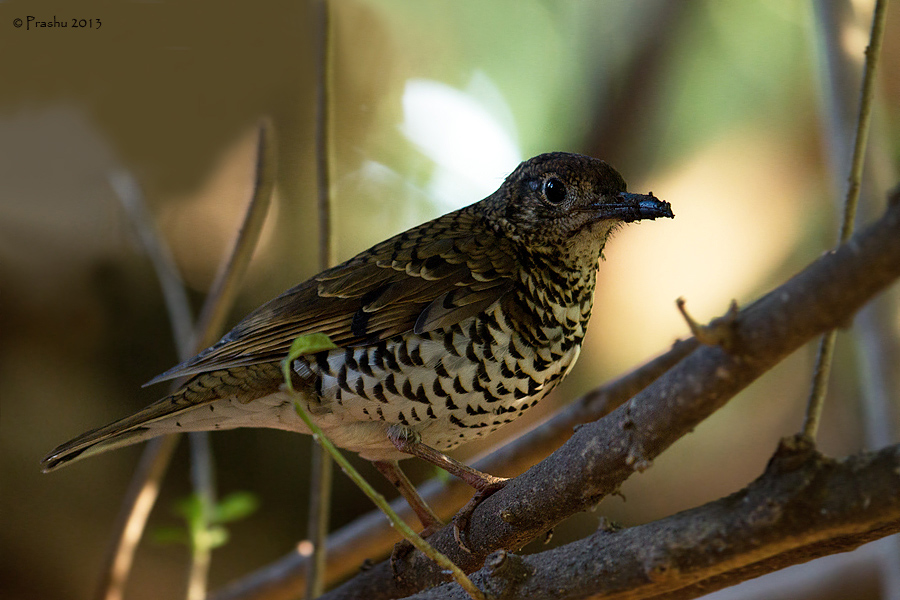
- from Ooty, Tamil Nadu

Scientific classification
- Kingdom: Animalia
- Phylum: Chordata
- Class: Aves
- Order: Passeriformes
- Family: Turdidae
- Genus: Zoothera
- Species: Z. neilgherriensis

Binomial name
- Zoothera neilgherriensis (Blyth, 1847)

Synonyms
- Zoothera dauma neilgherriensis

= Nilgiri thrush =

Species of bird

The Nilgiri thrush (Zoothera neilgherriensis) is a member of the thrush family.

== Distribution and habitat ==
The Nilgiri thrush is endemic to the Western Ghats. It is largely restricted to the sholas, isolated cloud forests found in high altitudes that are separated by rolling montane grassland. It is also rarely found in roadways on rainy days. It feeds on insects and is an opportunistic insectivore. The thrush stays on the terrestrial lower canopy of the moist shola ecosystem. The scaled pattern of this species gives it a protective side of camouflage in terrestrial understory of the forest. Habitat extent is distributed throughout the moist shola forests in the region.

== Description ==
The sexes are similar, 27–31 cm long, with black scaling on a paler white or yellowish background. The most striking identification feature in flight is the black band on the white underwings, a feature shared with Siberian thrush. The male has a song which is a loud, far-carrying mechanical whistle, with 5-10 second pauses between each one second long phrase twee...tuuu....tuuu....tuuu.

It was previously considered a subspecies of the scaly thrush.
