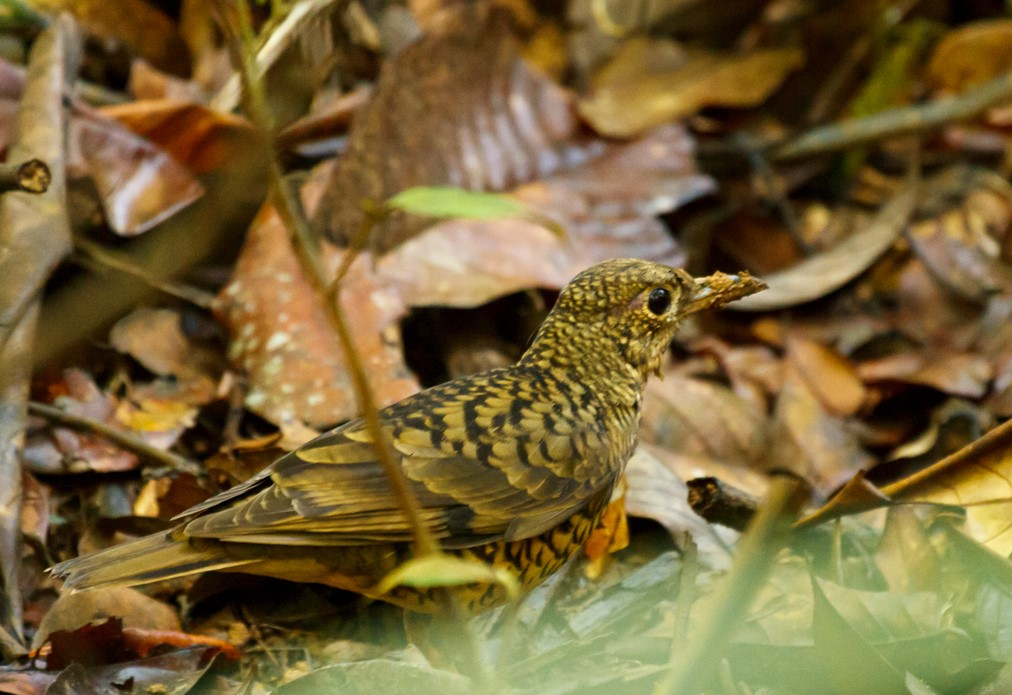

Conservation status
- Near Threatened (IUCN 3.1)

Scientific classification
- Kingdom: Animalia
- Phylum: Chordata
- Class: Aves
- Order: Passeriformes
- Family: Turdidae
- Genus: Zoothera
- Species: Z. imbricata

Binomial name
- Zoothera imbricata Layard, EL, 1854

Synonyms
- Zoothera dauma imbricata

= Sri Lanka thrush =

Species of bird

The Sri Lanka thrush or Sri Lanka scaly thrush (Zoothera imbricata) is a member of the thrush family Turdidae. This bird is an endemic resident breeder found in south western rainforests of the island of Sri Lanka.

Zoothera imbricata was formerly treated as a race of the scaly thrush. It belongs in a group, possibly a superspecies, formed by that species and Z. lunulata, Z. heinei, Z. machiki, Z. talaseae, Z. margaretae etc., Z. imbricata being smaller, longer billed and rufous below.
