= New Britain thrush =

Conservation status
- Least Concern (IUCN 3.1)

Scientific classification
- Kingdom: Animalia
- Phylum: Chordata
- Class: Aves
- Order: Passeriformes
- Family: Turdidae
- Genus: Zoothera
- Species: Z. talaseae

Binomial name
- Zoothera talaseae (Rothschild & Hartert, 1926)

Species of bird

The New Britain thrush (Zoothera talaseae) is a species of bird in the thrush family Turdidae. It is found in the montane forests on the Papua New Guinean islands of New Britain and Umboi.

The Bougainville thrush was formerly considered to be conspecific with the New Britain thrush and together the complex was known as the black-backed thrush.
