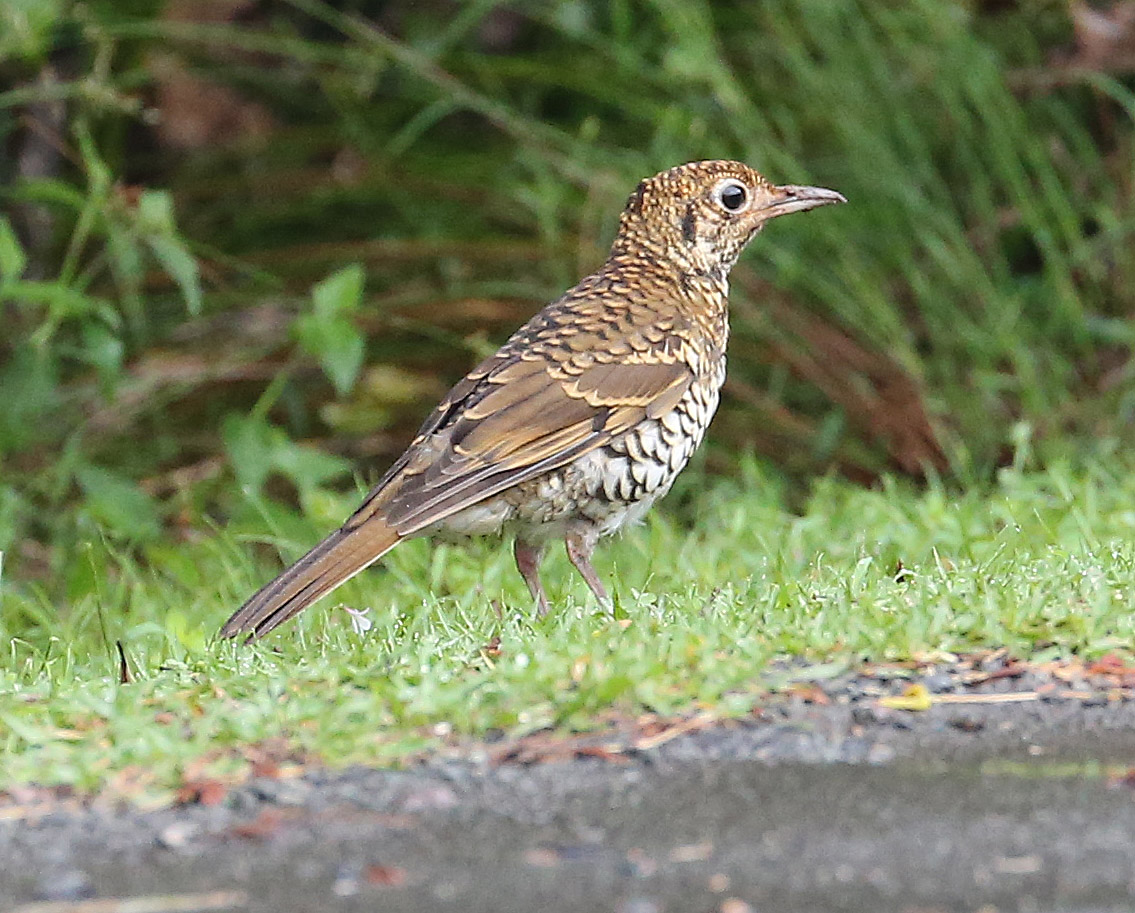

Conservation status
- Least Concern (IUCN 3.1)

Scientific classification
- Kingdom: Animalia
- Phylum: Chordata
- Class: Aves
- Order: Passeriformes
- Family: Turdidae
- Genus: Zoothera
- Species: Z. heinei

Binomial name
- Zoothera heinei (Cabanis, 1851)

= Russet-tailed thrush =

Species of bird

The russet-tailed thrush (Zoothera heinei) is a species of bird in the family Turdidae, closely related to the more widespread Bassian thrush (Zoothera lunulata). It is found in eastern Australia and Papua New Guinea.

Its natural habitats are temperate forests and subtropical or tropical moist lowland forests.

== Subspecies ==
There are four subspecies of the russet-tailed thrush.

Z. h. papuensis - montane west-central to northeast (Huon Peninsula) and southeast New Guinea.

Z. h. eichhorni - St. Matthias (=Mussau, north Bismarck Archipelago).

Z. h. choiseuli - montane Choiseul (north-central Solomon Is.; single 1904 record).

Z. h. heinei - east-central, southeast QLD to southeast NSW (eastern Australia).
