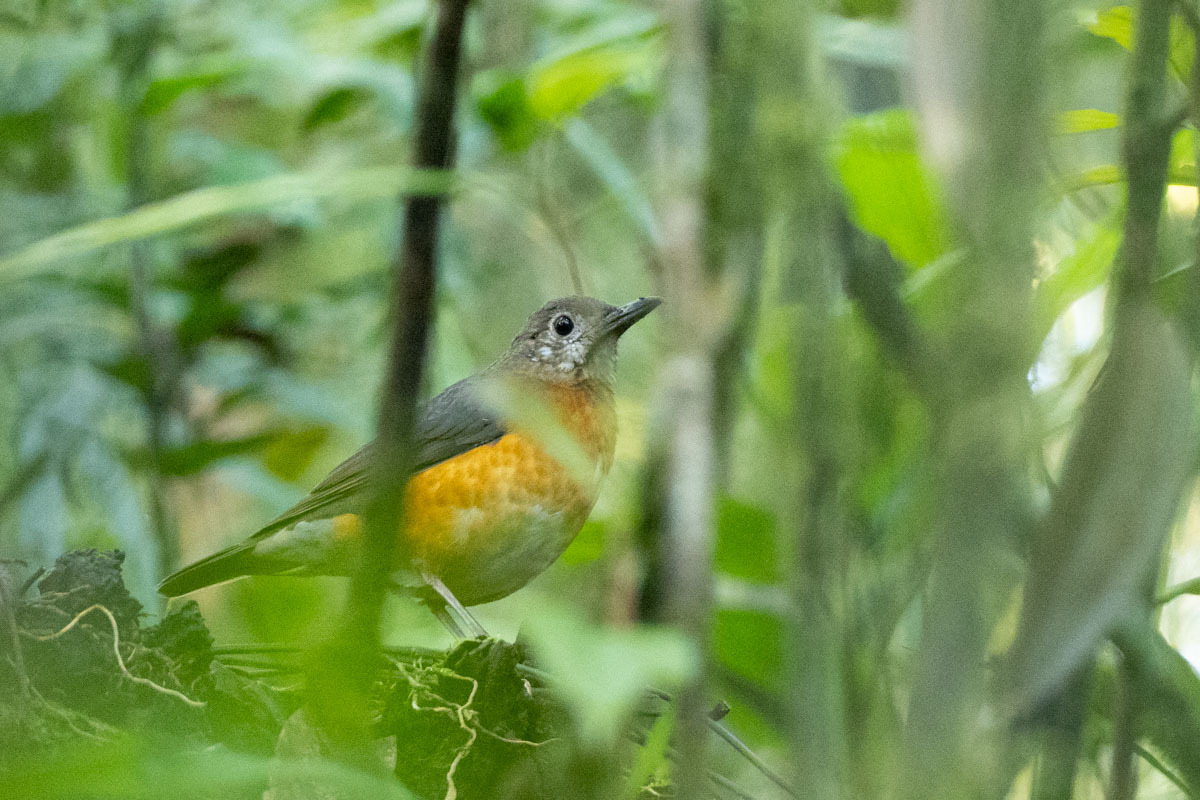

Conservation status
- Near Threatened (IUCN 3.1)

Scientific classification
- Kingdom: Animalia
- Phylum: Chordata
- Class: Aves
- Order: Passeriformes
- Family: Turdidae
- Genus: Zoothera
- Species: Z. everetti

Binomial name
- Zoothera everetti (Sharpe, 1892)

Synonyms
- Geocichla everetti Sharpe, 1892

= Everett's thrush =

Species of bird

Everett's thrush (Zoothera everetti), or Everett's ground thrush, is a species of oscine passerine bird belonging to the family Turdidae, the thrushes. This thrush is endemic to the northeastern mountains of Borneo.

== Taxonomy ==
Everett's thrush was first formally described as Geocichla everetti in 1892 by the English ornithologist Richard Bowdler Sharpe with its type locality given as Mount Dulit in Sabah. This species is placed in the genus Zoothera, the "Asian" thrushes. A Molecular phylogenetic analysis by Gary Voelker and collaborators published in 2008 found that Zoothera was polyphyletic. To create monophyletic genera 21 species were moved from Zoothera to the resurrected genus Geokichla, this species was retained in Zoothera. The genus Zoothera is included in the family Turdidae, the thrushes and related species, within the superfamily Muscicapoidea in the songbird suborder Passeri, which is in the order Passeriformes.

== Etymology ==
Everett's thrush belongs to the genus Zoothera, a name that combines the Ancient Greek zōon meaning "animal" with -thēra meaning "hunter". The specific name, as well as the common name, honours the British colonial administrator and zoological collector Alfred Hart Everett.

== Description ==
Everett's thrush has a slaty-grey back with orange underparts and a brown head with pale greyish blotches on the face. The females are similar to the males but are browner on the back. This species has a length of 19 cm (7.5 in) and a wing length of 108–112 mm (4.3–4.4 in) for males and 108 mm (4.3 in) in females. The calls of this species are poorly understood and infrequently recorded, it does have a harsh, frantic alarm call and a softer call which has been transcribed as "deeer".

== Distribution and habitat ==
Everett's thrush is endemic to the island of Borneo where it has been recorded only from the mountains of Sabah and northern Sarawak in eastern Malaysia. Its natural habitat is subtropical or tropical mossy montane forests at altitudes between 1,200 and 2,200 m (3,900 and 7,200 ft). It is threatened by habitat loss.
