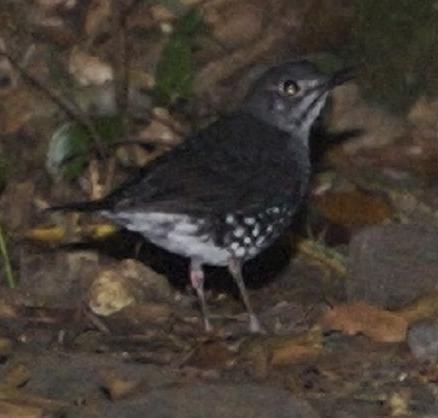

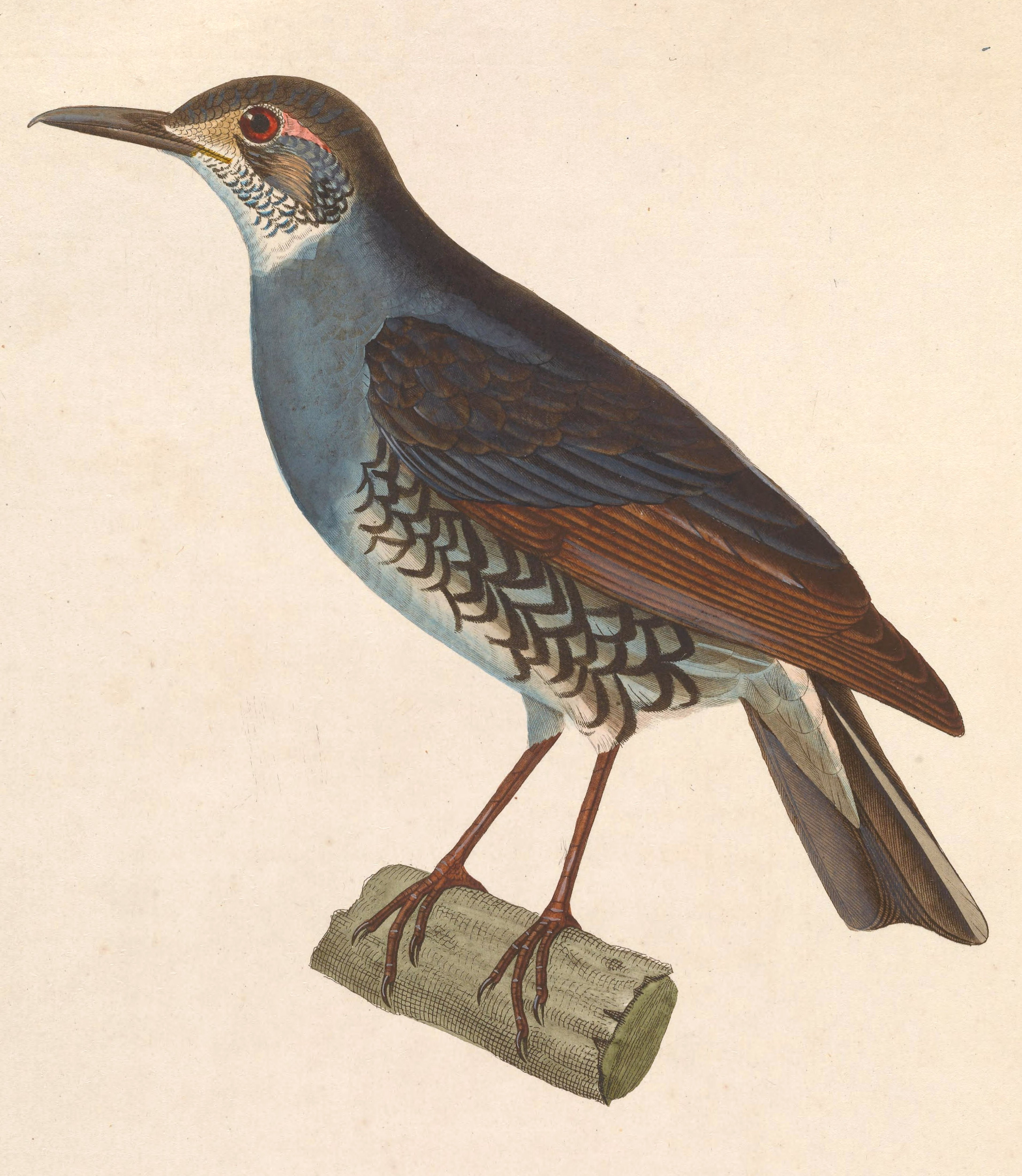

Conservation status
- Least Concern (IUCN 3.1)

Scientific classification
- Kingdom: Animalia
- Phylum: Chordata
- Class: Aves
- Order: Passeriformes
- Family: Turdidae
- Genus: Zoothera
- Species: Z. andromedae

Binomial name
- Zoothera andromedae (Temminck, 1826)

= Sunda thrush =

Species of bird

The Sunda thrush (Zoothera andromedae) is a species of bird in the family Turdidae. It is found in Indonesia, Malaysia, and the Philippines.

Its natural habitats are tropical moist lowland forests and tropical moist montane forests

== Description and taxonomy ==
Despite its highly spreadout montane distribution, no geographical variation is evident. This species is monotypic and has no subspecies.

== Ecology and behavior ==
This species feeds on insects where it hops around the forest floor that is well shaded with dense vegetation.

This species breeds from October to February but an adult in breeding condition with enlarged gonads has been collected in June on Mindanao. Nest is a solid cup of moss with fine roots, stems, lichens mixed with clay and palm fibers. This species lays 2 to 3 buff eggs with brownish speckles.

== Habitat and conservation status ==
Its natural habitat is typically tropical moist montane forests above 1,000 meters above sea level throughout most of its range but it has been recorded as low as 450 masl in Enggano Island, Lombok and Sumbawa.

This species has been assessed as IUCN Red List as Least-concern species. It is described rare in the Philippines, Bali and Java but is more common in Sumatra and Enggano Island. This species has a wide range and its preference for montane habitat means that a large area of habitat is more secure from deforestation due to inaccessibility.
