= Bougainville thrush =

Conservation status
- Near Threatened (IUCN 3.1)

Scientific classification
- Kingdom: Animalia
- Phylum: Chordata
- Class: Aves
- Order: Passeriformes
- Family: Turdidae
- Genus: Zoothera
- Species: Z. atrigena

Binomial name
- Zoothera atrigena Ripley & Hadden, 1982

Species of bird

The Bougainville thrush (Zoothera atrigena) is a species of bird in the thrush family Turdidae. It is found in the montane forests of Bougainville Island in the Solomon Islands Archipelago.

It was formerly considered to be conspecific with the New Britain thrush with the combined taxa known as the black-backed thrush.

== Taxonomy ==
The Bougainville thrush was formally described in 1982 by Dillon Ripley and Don Hadden from a specimen collected at an altitude of 1,500 m (4,900 ft) on Bougainville Island, Papua New Guinea. They considered it to be a subspecies of the black-backed thrush (now renamed the New Britain thrush) and coined the trinomial name Zoothera talaseae atrigena. The epithet atrigena combines Latin ater meaning "black" with gena meaning "cheek". The Bougainville thrush is now considered to be a separate species based on its distinctive morphology.
