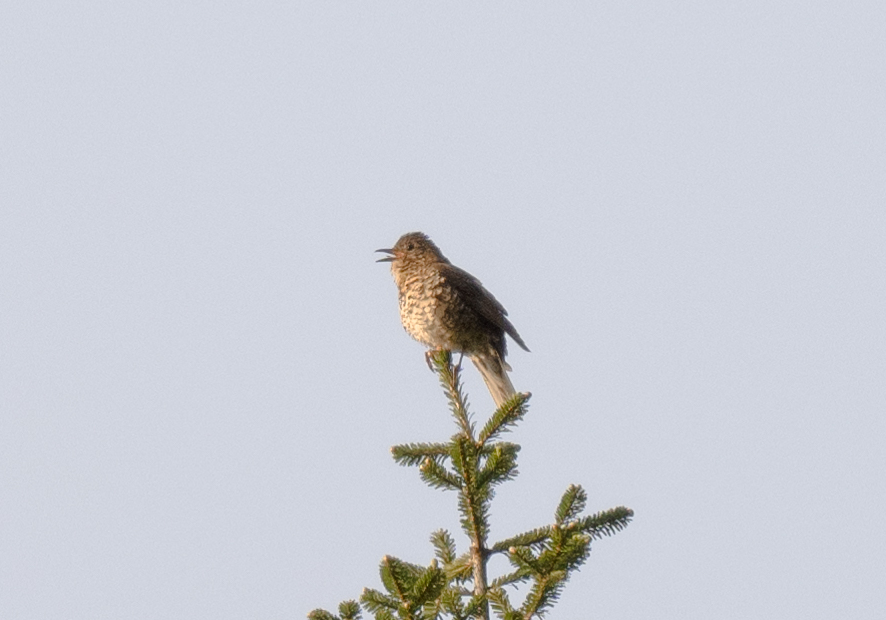

Conservation status
- Least Concern (IUCN 3.1)

Scientific classification
- Kingdom: Animalia
- Phylum: Chordata
- Class: Aves
- Order: Passeriformes
- Family: Turdidae
- Genus: Zoothera
- Species: Z. griseiceps

Binomial name
- Zoothera griseiceps (Delacour, 1930)

= Sichuan thrush =

Species of bird

The Sichuan thrush or Sichuan forest thrush (Zoothera griseiceps) is a species of bird in the thrush family. It breeds in central China and winters in northern Vietnam. The Sichuan thrush was formerly considered as conspecific with the alpine thrush and the Himalayan thrush as the plain-backed thrush until split in 2016.
