= Guadalcanal thrush =

Conservation status
- Vulnerable (IUCN 3.1)

Scientific classification
- Kingdom: Animalia
- Phylum: Chordata
- Class: Aves
- Order: Passeriformes
- Family: Turdidae
- Genus: Zoothera
- Species: Z. turipavae

Binomial name
- Zoothera turipavae Cain & Galbraith, 1955

Species of bird

The Guadalcanal thrush (Zoothera turipavae) is a species of bird in the family Turdidae. It is endemic to Guadalcanal. Its natural habitat is subtropical or tropical moist montane forests.
