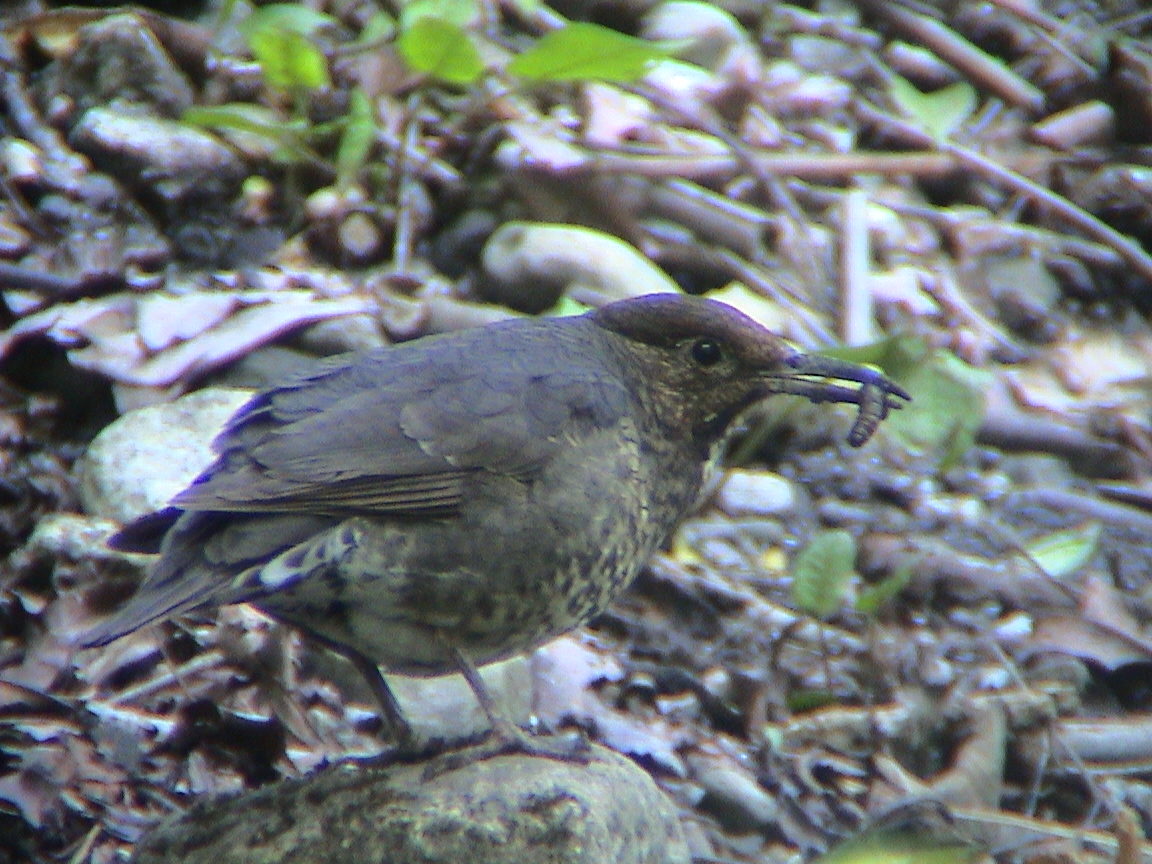
- At around 10,000', in Western Uttarakhand, India.

Conservation status
- Least Concern (IUCN 3.1)

Scientific classification
- Kingdom: Animalia
- Phylum: Chordata
- Class: Aves
- Order: Passeriformes
- Family: Turdidae
- Genus: Zoothera
- Species: Z. monticola

Binomial name
- Zoothera monticola Vigors, 1832

= Long-billed thrush =

Species of bird

The long-billed thrush (Zoothera monticola) is a species of bird in the family Turdidae. It is found from the Himalayas to Myanmar and Vietnam. Its natural habitat is subtropical or tropical moist montane forests.

== Gallery ==
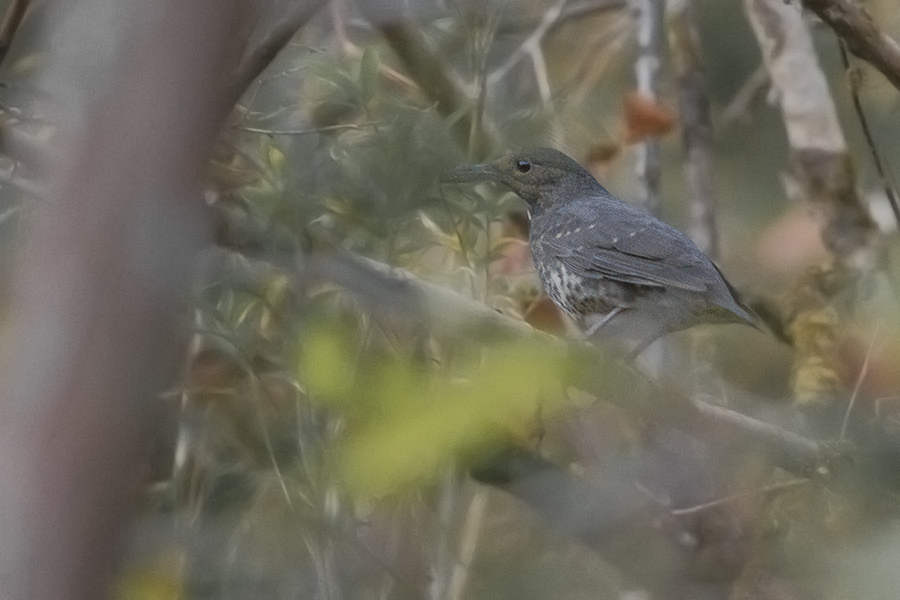
Specimen from Kedarnath Musk Deer Sanctuary, Uttarakhand, India.

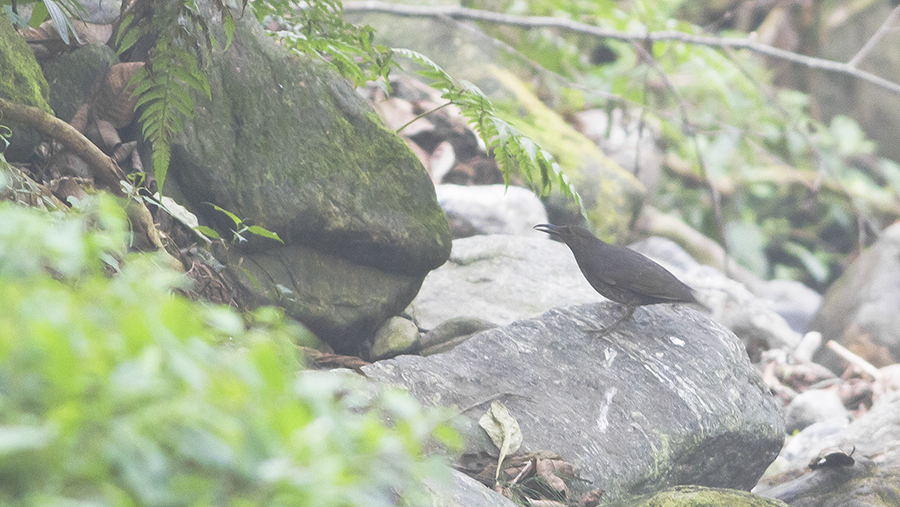
From Khangchendzonga National Park, West Sikkim, India.

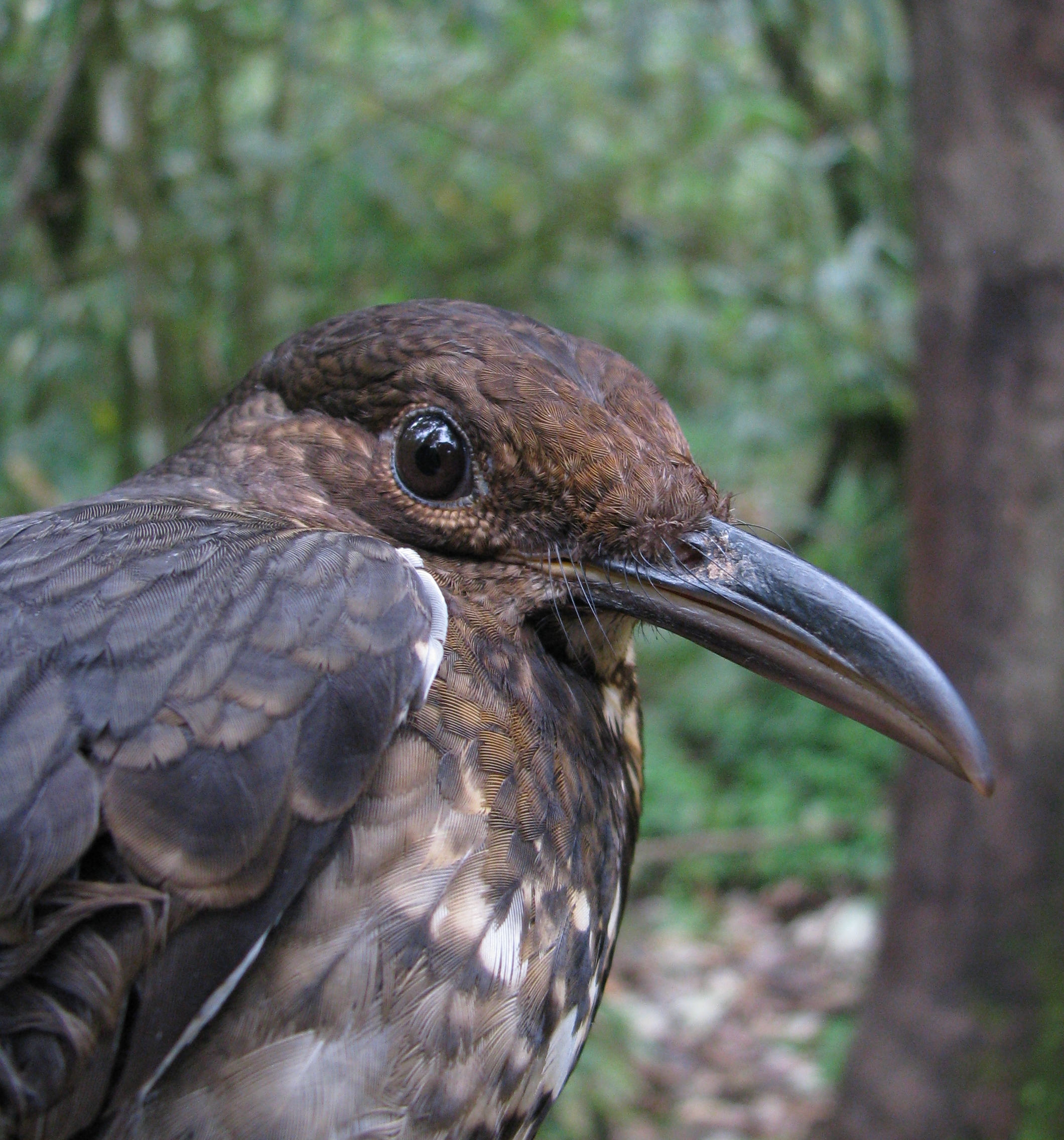
Long-billed thrush, Arunachal Pradesh, India

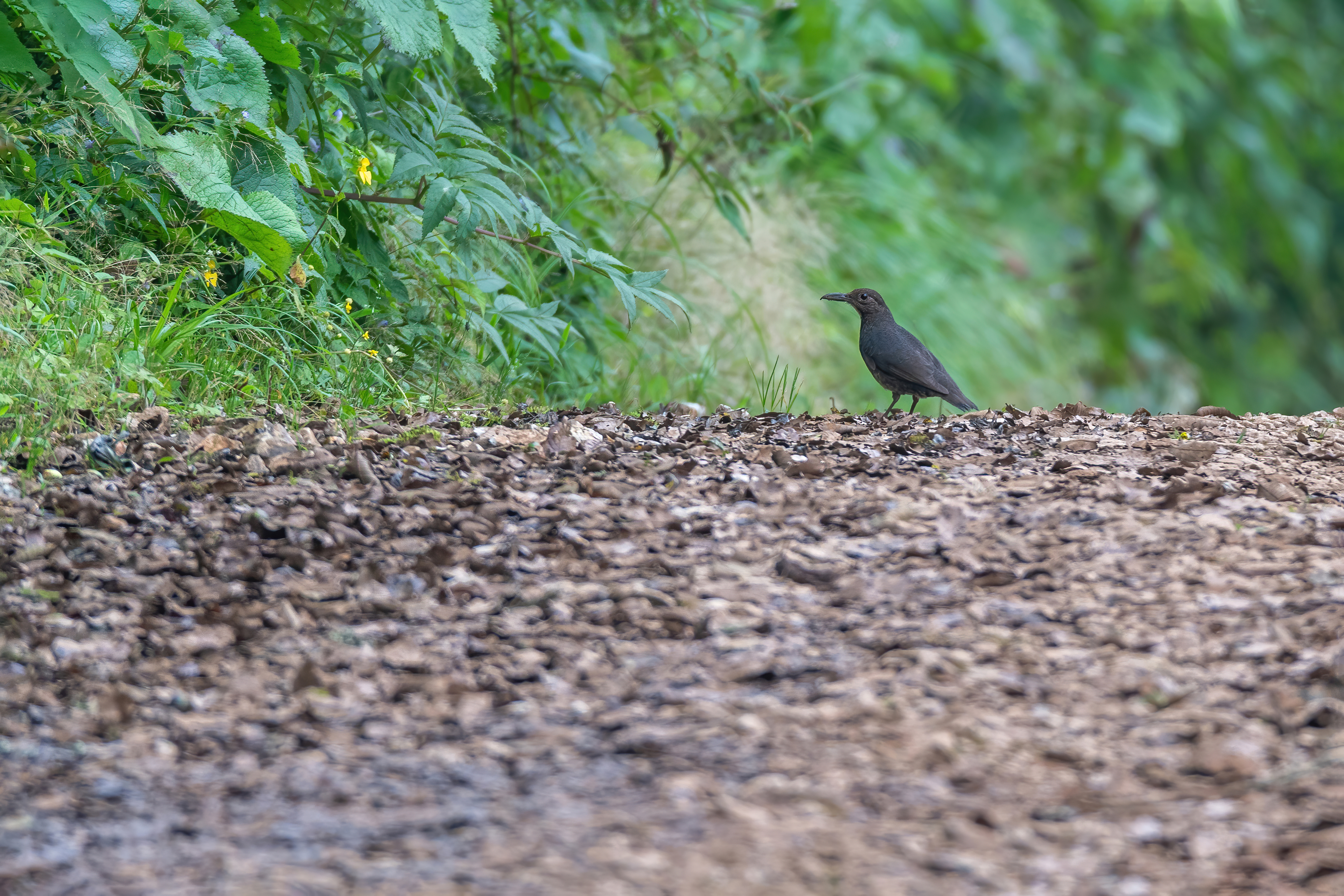
In Phulchoki, Nepal.
