= Makira thrush =

Conservation status
- Near Threatened (IUCN 3.1)

Scientific classification
- Kingdom: Animalia
- Phylum: Chordata
- Class: Aves
- Order: Passeriformes
- Family: Turdidae
- Genus: Zoothera
- Species: Z. margaretae

Binomial name
- Zoothera margaretae (Mayr, 1935)
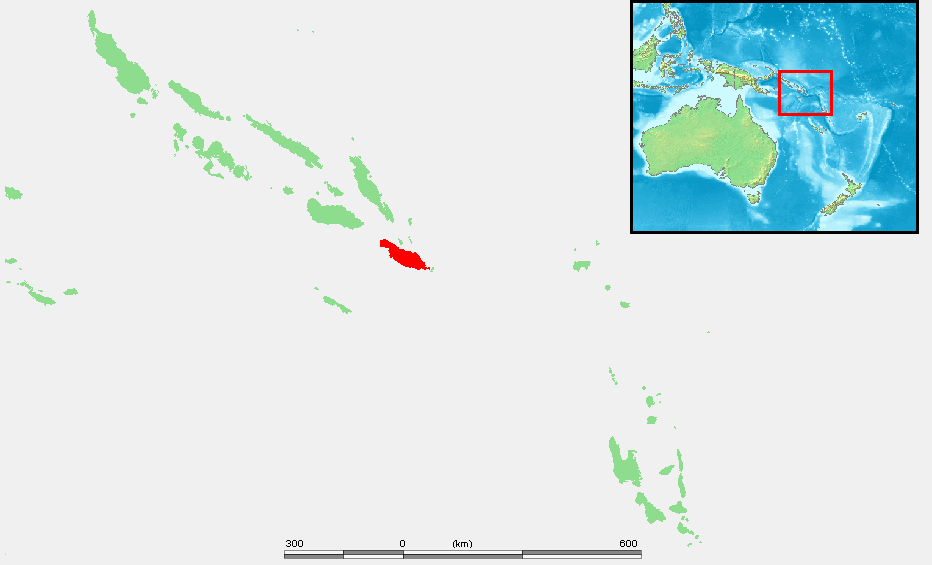

Species of bird

The Makira thrush (Zoothera margaretae), also known as the San Cristobal thrush, is a species of bird in the family Turdidae. It is endemic to the Solomon Islands. Its natural habitat is subtropical or tropical moist lowland forests. It is threatened by habitat loss.
