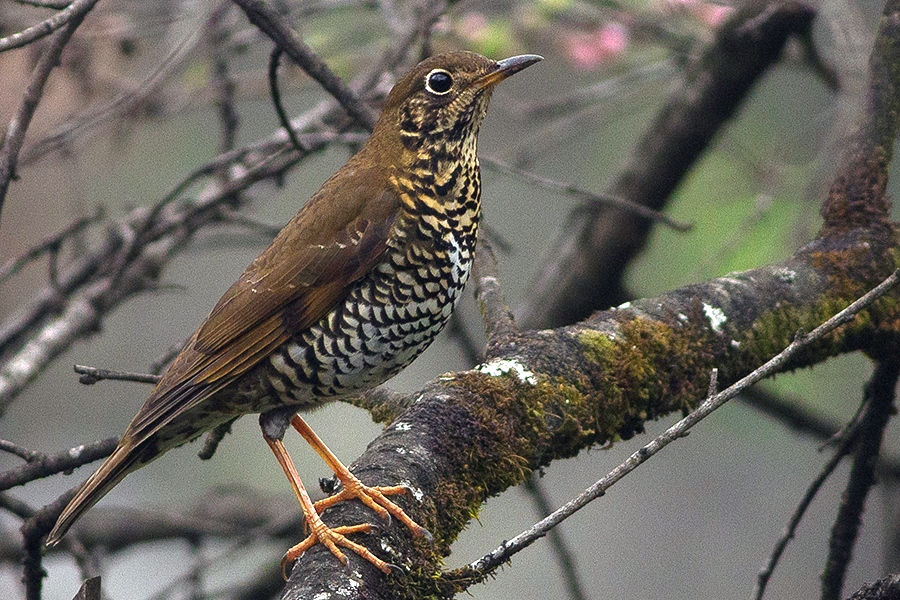
- From Khangchendzonga Biosphere Reserve, West Sikkim, India

Conservation status
- Least Concern (IUCN 3.1)

Scientific classification
- Kingdom: Animalia
- Phylum: Chordata
- Class: Aves
- Order: Passeriformes
- Family: Turdidae
- Genus: Zoothera
- Species: Z. mollissima

Binomial name
- Zoothera mollissima (Blyth, 1842)

= Alpine thrush =

Species of bird

The alpine thrush (Zoothera mollissima) is a species of bird in the thrush family.

== Taxonomy and systematics ==
The alpine thrush was formerly known as the plain-backed thrush, until the latter was split into the alpine thrush, Sichuan thrush and the newly discovered Himalayan thrush.

== Distribution and habitat ==
It is found from the north-western Himalayas to southern China. Its natural habitats are subtropical or tropical high-altitude shrubland and subtropical or tropical high-altitude grassland.

== Gallery ==
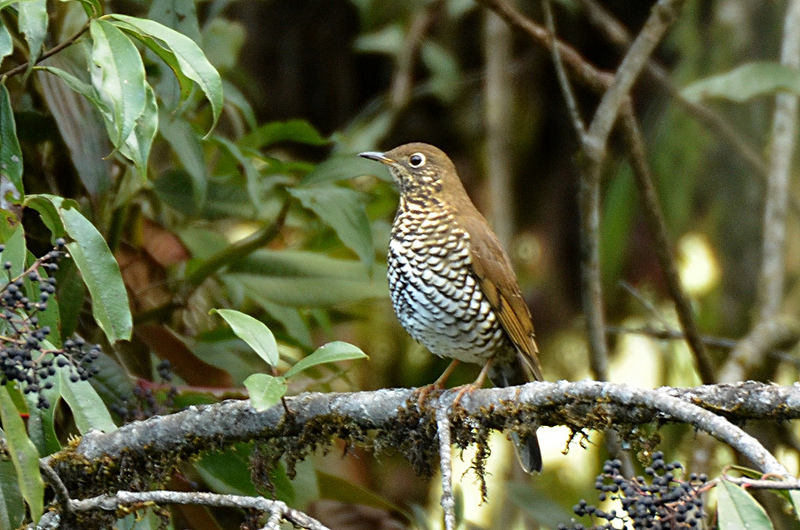
Himalayan thrush from Mishmi Hills, Arunachal Pradesh, India

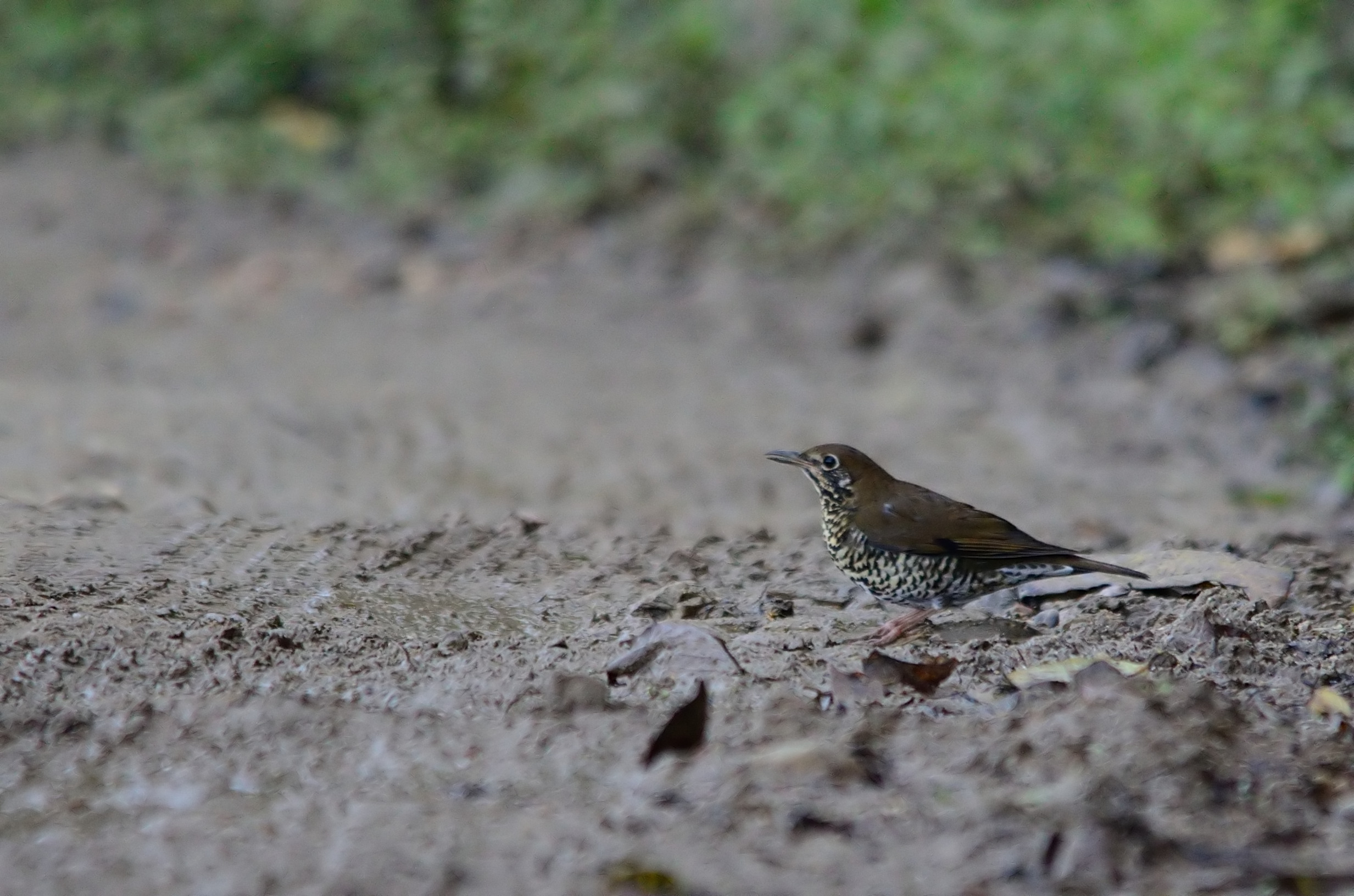
Alpine thrush at Namdapha National Park
