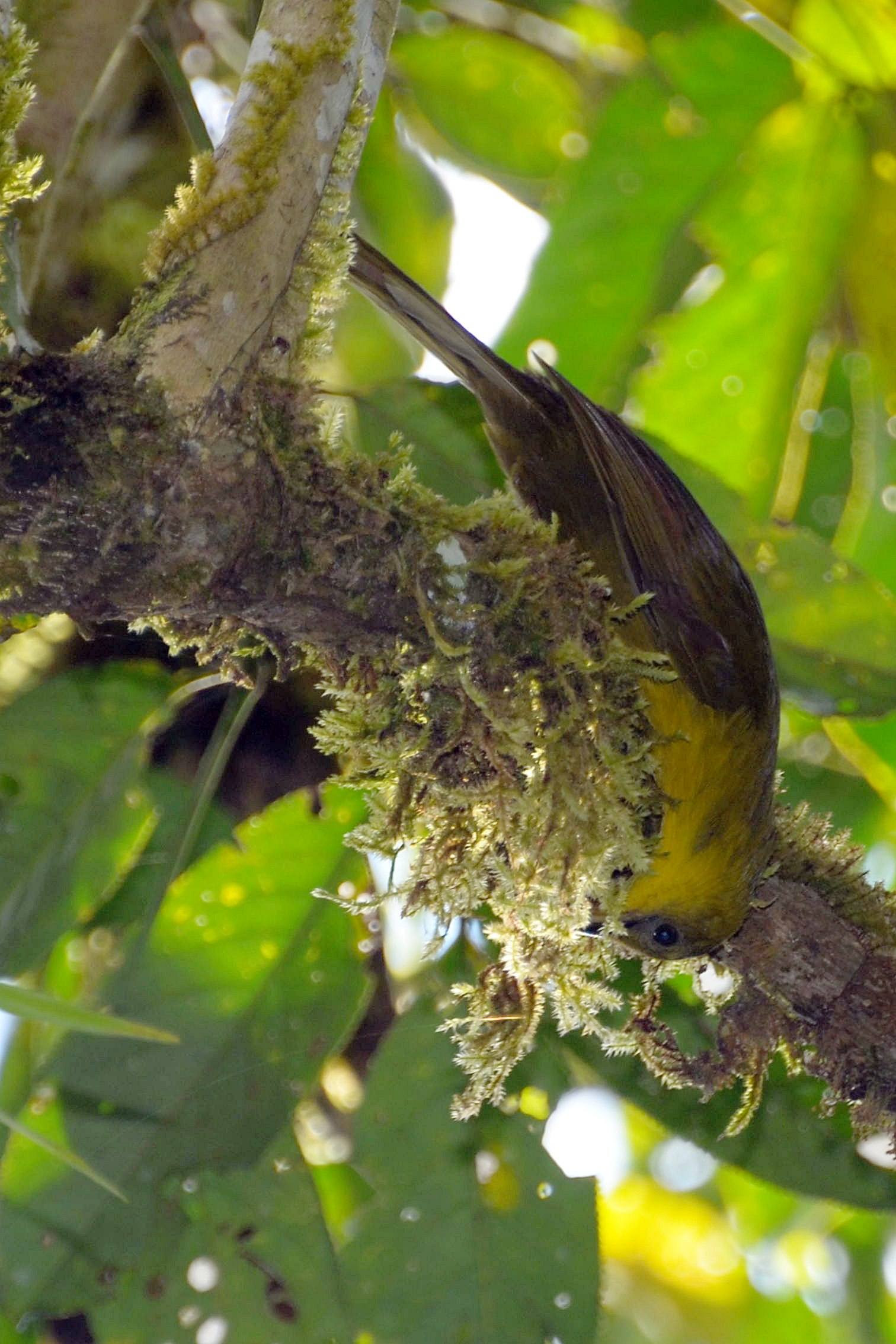

Conservation status
- Least Concern (IUCN 3.1)

Scientific classification
- Kingdom: Animalia
- Phylum: Chordata
- Class: Aves
- Order: Passeriformes
- Family: Locustellidae
- Genus: Malia; Schlegel, 1880
- Species: M. grata

Binomial name
- Malia grata Schlegel, 1880
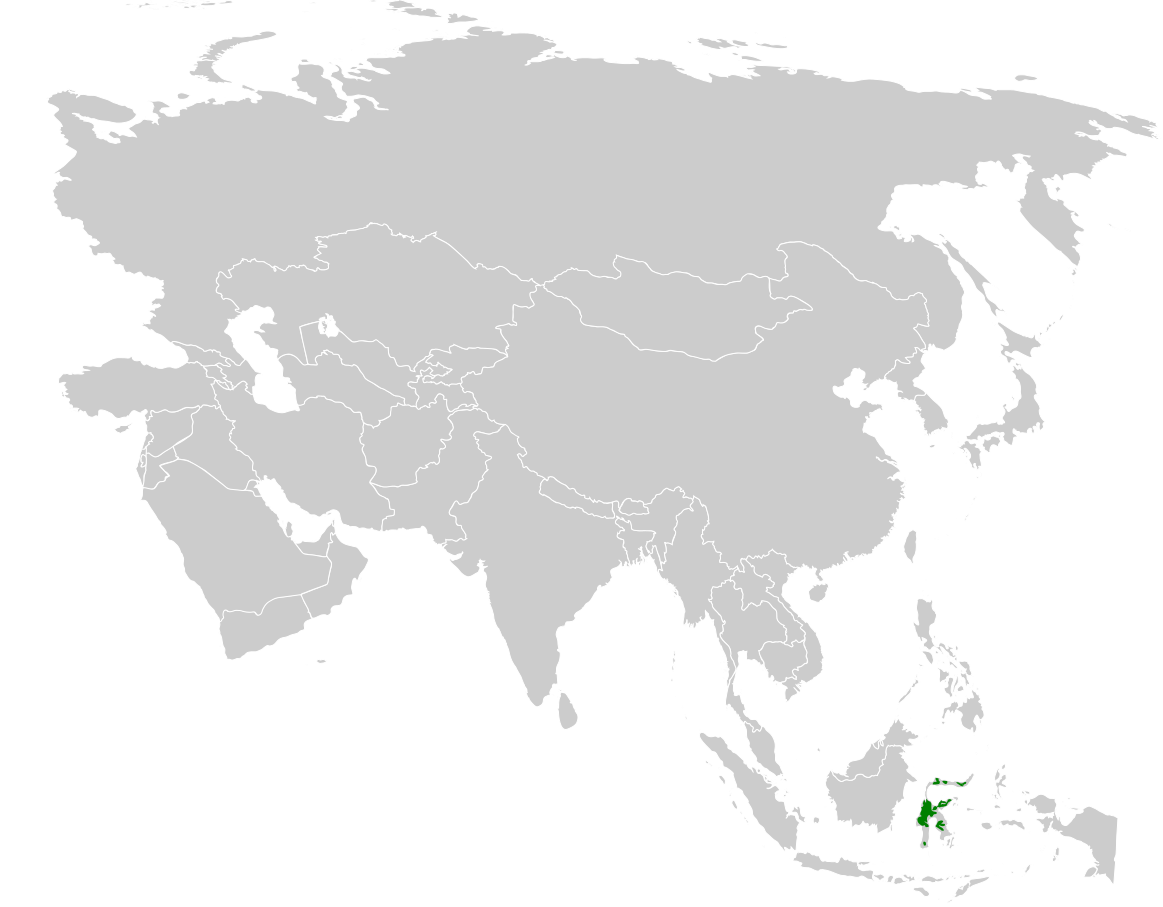

= Malia grata =

Species of bird

The malia (Malia grata) is a medium-sized (approximately 29 cm long) babbler-like passerine. It has an olive-green plumage, yellowish head and chest, and pinkish-brown bill. The young is duller than the adult. It is the only member of the genus Malia.

An Indonesian endemic, the malia is restricted to montane forests of Sulawesi. Usually, it is found in pairs or small groups of three to seven birds. The diet consists mainly of insects, beetles and other arthropods.

There has been some debate over the taxonomic relationships of the malia. It has some plumage characteristics reminiscent of bulbuls, and has been shifted between that family and the wastebasket taxon Timaliidae sensu lato by past authors. A study published early in 2012 found that the malia was not a babbler; later in the same year, a second study determined that it was instead an aberrant member of the family Locustellidae.

Widespread and common in its habitat and range, the malia is evaluated as Least Concern on the IUCN Red List of Threatened Species.
