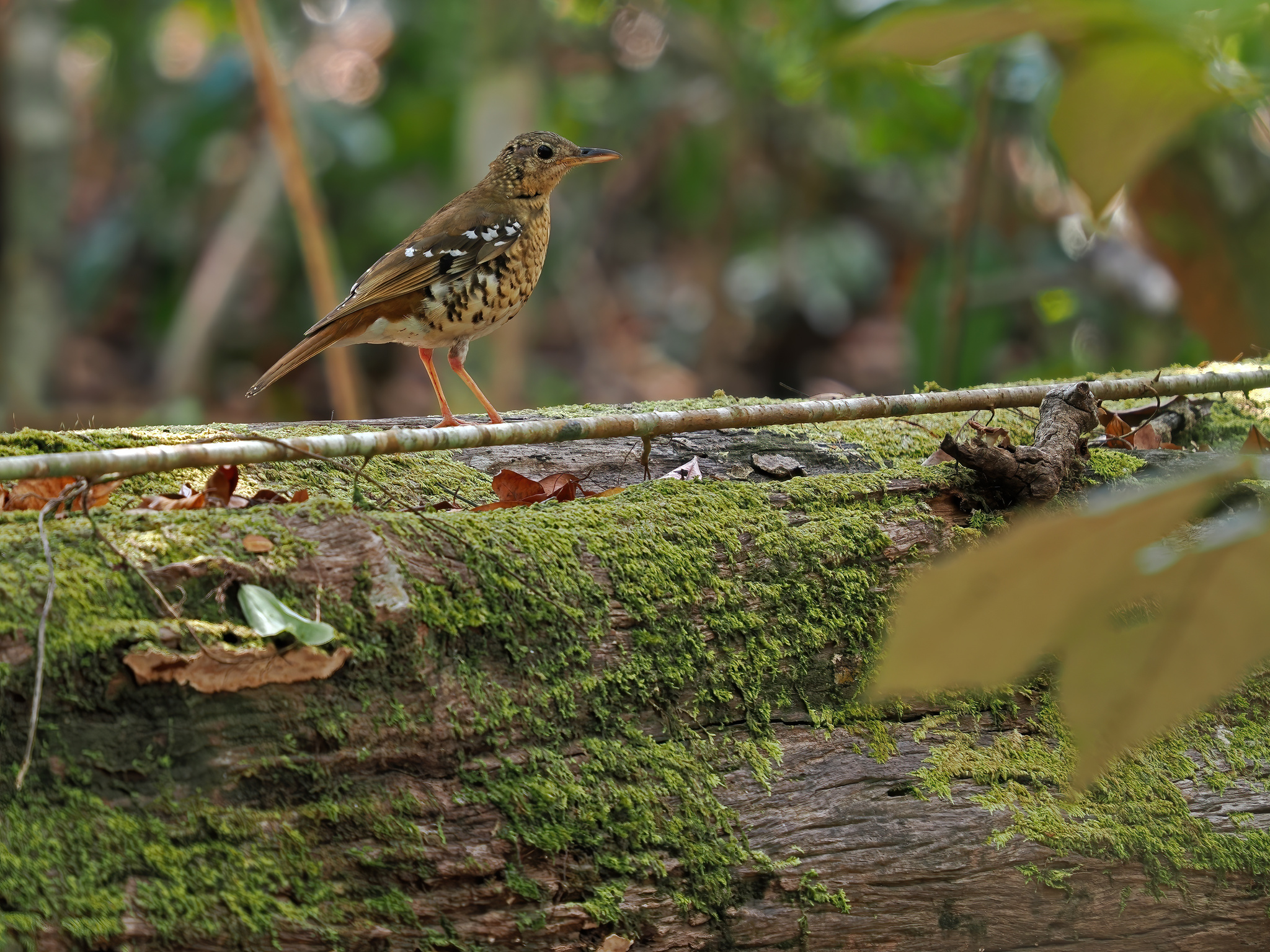

Conservation status
- Near Threatened (IUCN 3.1)

Scientific classification
- Kingdom: Animalia
- Phylum: Chordata
- Class: Aves
- Order: Passeriformes
- Family: Turdidae
- Genus: Zoothera
- Species: Z. machiki

Binomial name
- Zoothera machiki (Forbes, 1884)

Synonyms
- Geocichla machiki Forbes, 1884

= Fawn-breasted thrush =

Species of bird

The fawn-breasted thrush (Zoothera machiki) is a species of bird in the family Turdidae. It is endemic to the Tanimbar Islands in Indonesia. Its natural habitat is subtropical or tropical moist lowland forests. It is threatened by habitat loss.
