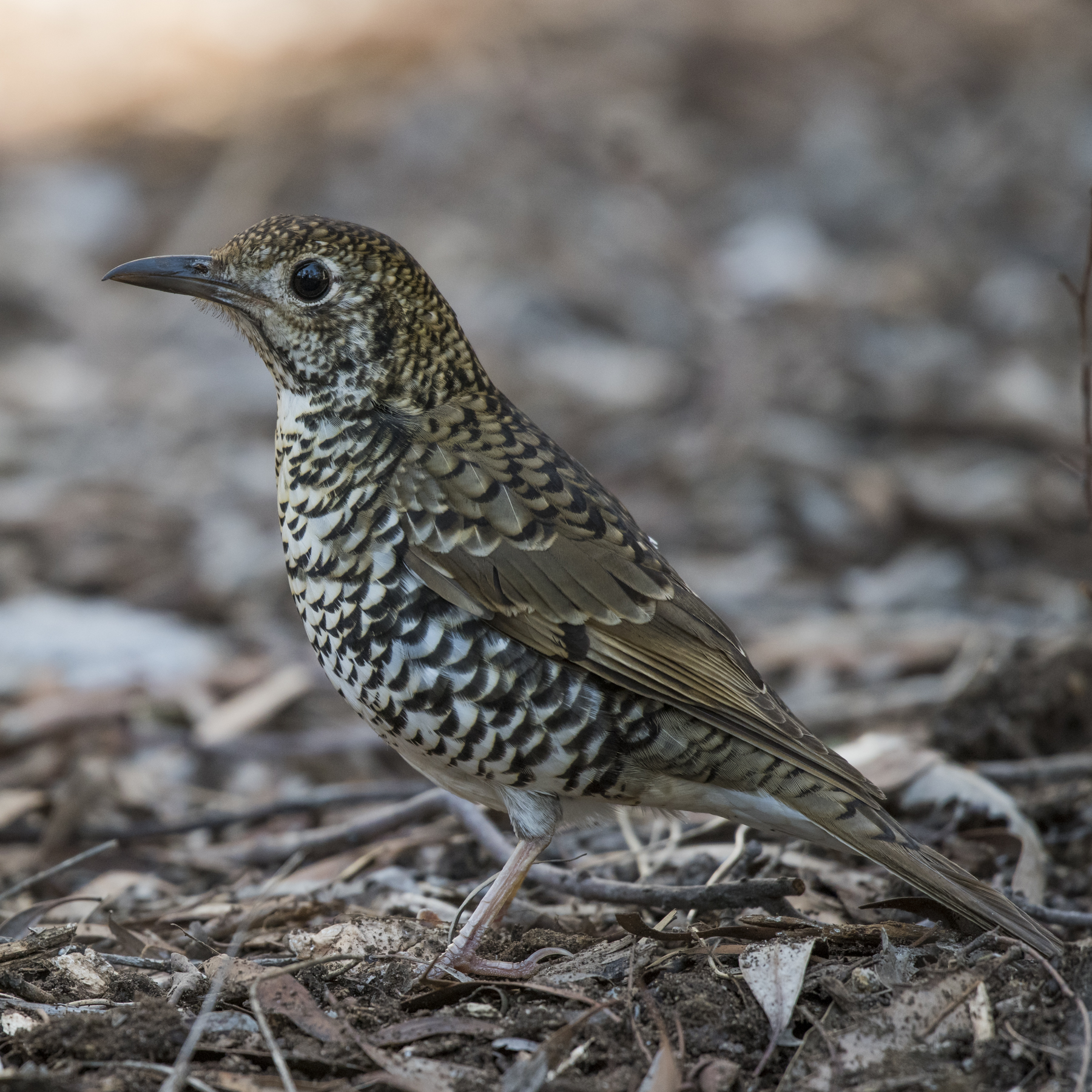
- Bassian thrush at Australian National Botanic Gardens, Canberra, Australia

Conservation status
- Least Concern (IUCN 3.1)

Scientific classification
- Kingdom: Animalia
- Phylum: Chordata
- Class: Aves
- Order: Passeriformes
- Family: Turdidae
- Genus: Zoothera
- Species: Z. lunulata

Binomial name
- Zoothera lunulata (Latham, 1801)

Subspecies
- Z. l. cuneata; Z. l. halmaturina; Z. l. lunulata; Z. l. macrorhyncha; Z. l. macrorhyncha; Z. l. papuensis

= Bassian thrush =

Species of bird

The Bassian thrush (Zoothera lunulata), also known as the olive-tailed thrush, is a medium-sized mostly insectivorous thrush found from northern Queensland to southeastern Australia. It also occurs in Tasmania, on some larger islands of Bass Strait, and on Kangaroo Island. The thrushes range from 27 to 29 cm (10.5 to 11.5 in) in length and average 100 g (3.5 oz) in weight.

It is estimated that the range-wide population is large, though no official count has ever been established. The population appears to be declining because of ongoing habitat destruction and degradation, but not at a rate that is concerning.

The Bassian thrush lives in shrubland, forests, and rainforests. It appears to be a resident species, but there is some evidence that some individuals have nomadic tendencies, usually in the non-breeding season.

The thrush ranges in colour from brown to olive, with a white ring around its eyes and black bars on its back, rear, and head. Its underbody is paler, with dark scalloping, and its wings have a dark bar running the length of the underside.

Nesting begins in the winter months (from late June) and continues till the end of summer. The two or three eggs which form a clutch vary from pale green or blue to light stone. The cup-shaped nest is usually built of strips of bark, at times mixed with leaves, and is lined with grasses and rootlets. Sites vary from a few feet to 50 feet (15 m) from ground. A fork in a tree is usually favoured, but the nest may be placed on a stump, or a ledge in a cave.

Bassian thrushes are known to dislodge their prey out of piles of leaves by disturbing the leaf litter. The birds move quietly and often pause to listen for the movements of the insects.

== Gallery ==
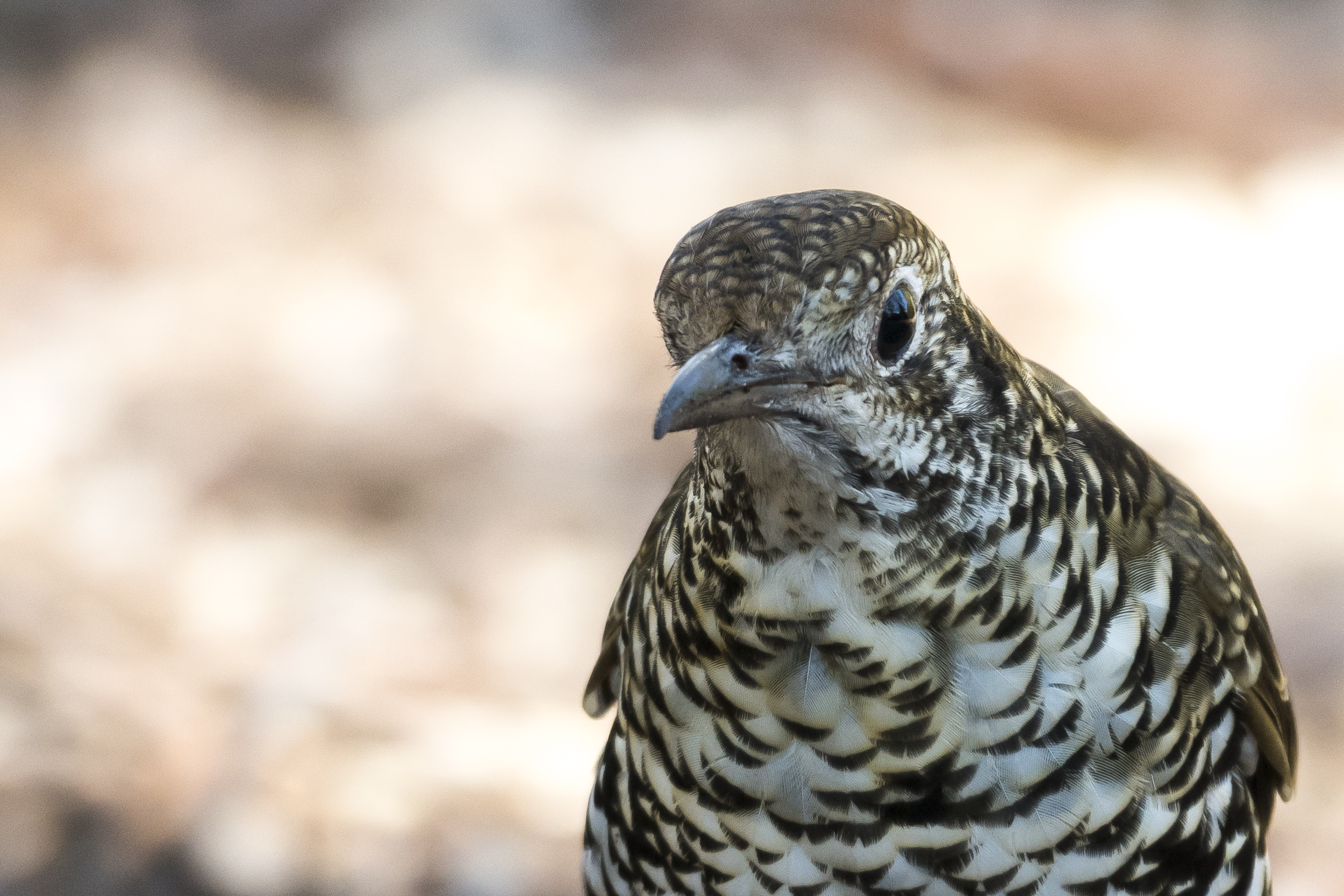
Bassian thrush at Australian National Botanic Gardens, Canberra

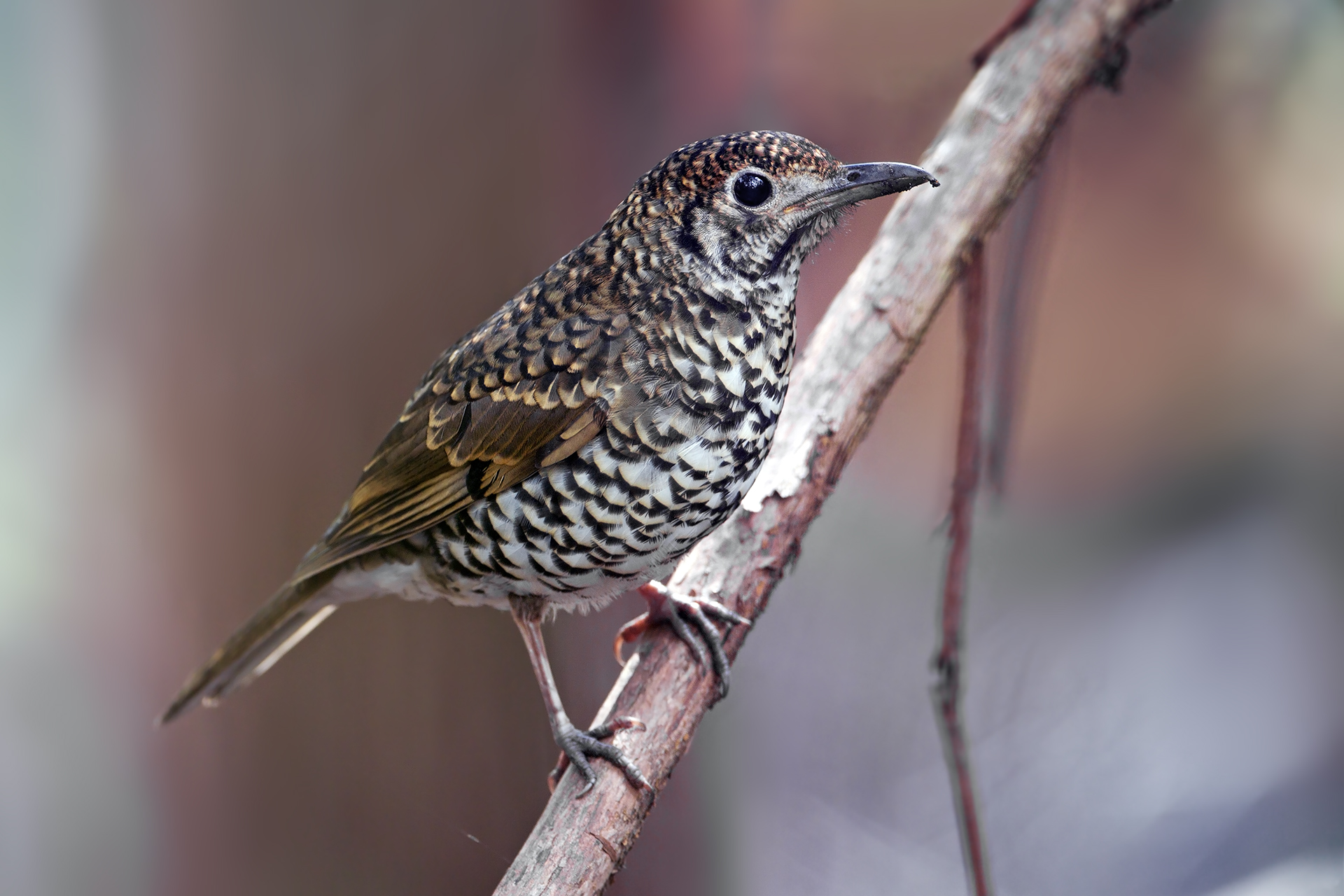
Bassian thrush at Southwest National Park, Tasmania

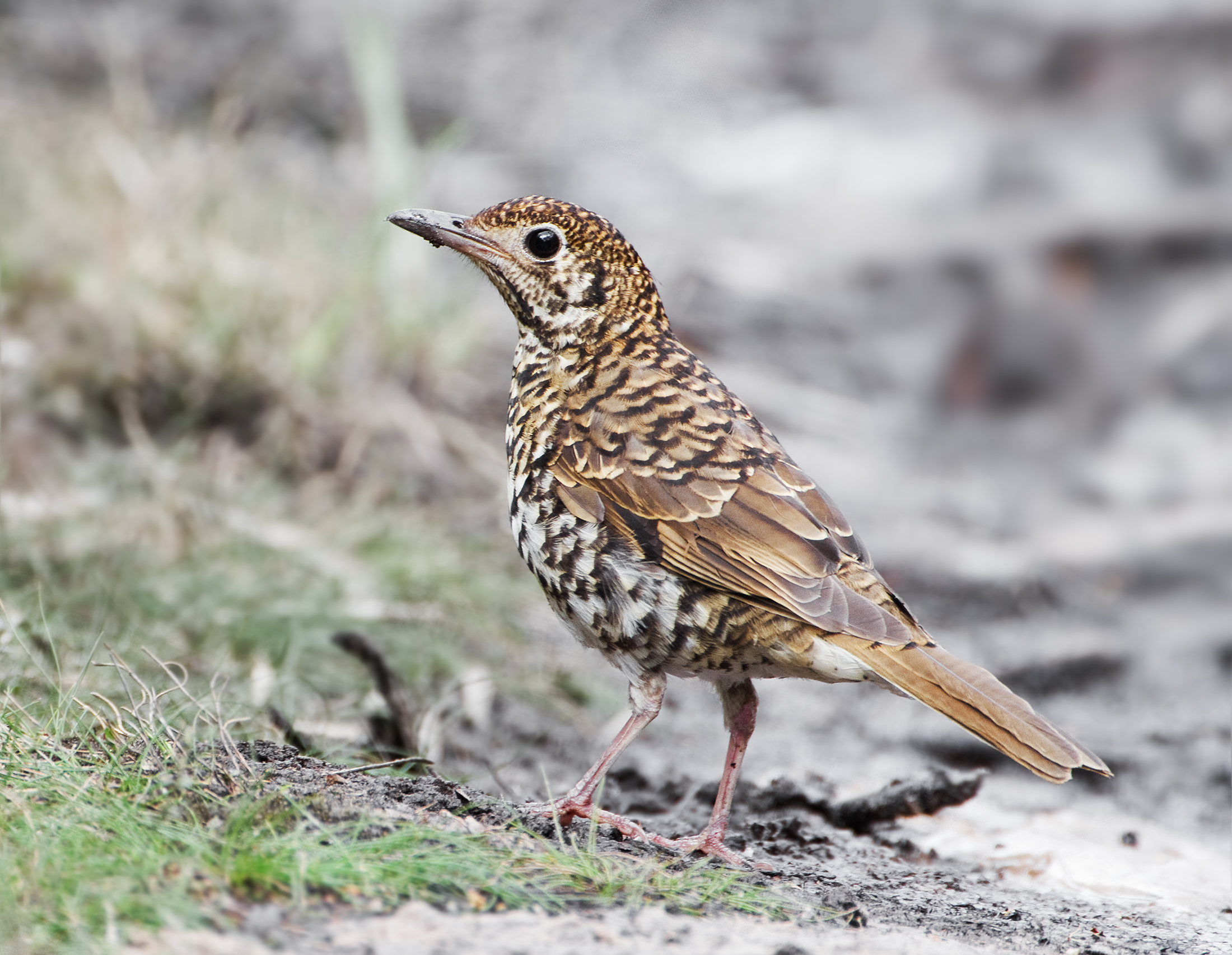
Bassian thrush at Bruny island, Tasmania
