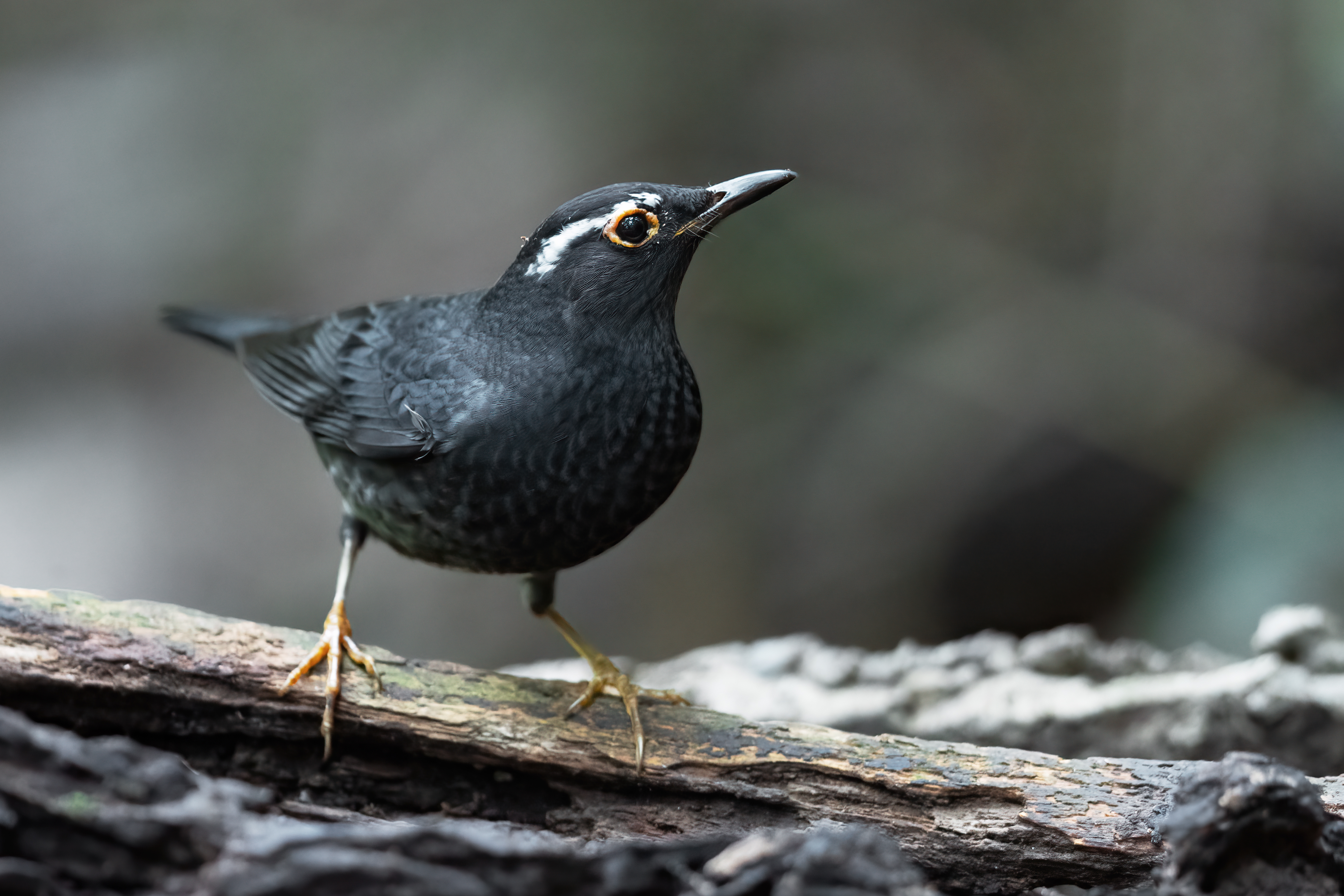
- male
- female

Conservation status
- Least Concern (IUCN 3.1)

Scientific classification
- Kingdom: Animalia
- Phylum: Chordata
- Class: Aves
- Order: Passeriformes
- Family: Turdidae
- Genus: Geokichla
- Species: G. sibirica

Binomial name
- Geokichla sibirica (Pallas, 1776)

Synonyms
- Zoothera sibirica

= Siberian thrush =

Species of bird

The Siberian thrush (Geokichla sibirica) is a member of the thrush family, Turdidae. The genus name Geokichla comes from Ancient Greek geo-, "ground-" and kikhle, " thrush". The specific sibirica is Latin for Siberia.

It breeds in taiga in Siberia. It is strongly migratory, with most birds moving to southeastern Asia during the winter. It is a very rare vagrant to western Europe. It is very secretive.

The Siberian thrush is similar in size to the song thrush. It is omnivorous, eating a wide range of insects, earthworms and berries.

The male Siberian thrush is a dark blue-grey above and below, with a white stripe above the eye. The lower belly and flanks are white. The female is a much browner bird, with a buff stripe above the eye.

A striking identification feature of both sexes in flight is the black band on the white underwings, a feature shared with the scaly thrush.

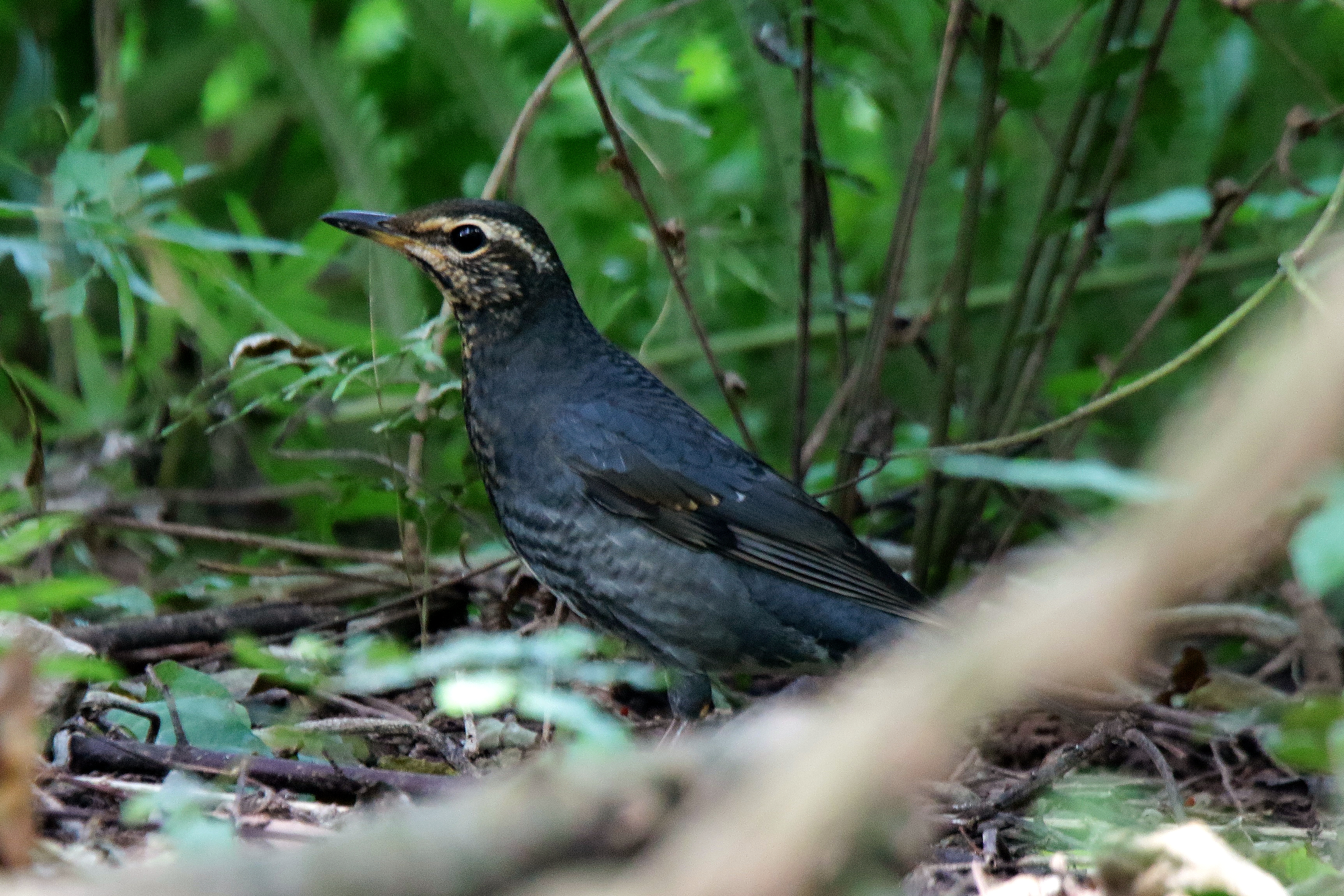
Siberian Thrush
