= Island thrush =

The island thrush species complex has been split into 17 species:

- Bismarck island thrush, Turdus heinrothi
- Bougainville island thrush, Turdus bougainvillei
- Christmas island thrush, Turdus erythropleurus
- Fiji island thrush, Turdus ruficeps
- Luzon island thrush, Turdus thomassoni
- Mindanao island thrush, Turdus nigrorum
- Mindoro island thrush, Turdus mindorensis
- Moluccan island thrush, Turdus deningeri
- New Caledonian island thrush, Turdus xanthopus
- Papuan island thrush, Turdus papuensis
- Samoan island thrush, Turdus samoensis
- Solomons island thrush, Turdus kulambangrae
- Sundaic island thrush, Turdus javanicus
- Tasman Sea island thrush, Turdus poliocephalus
- Vanikoro island thrush, Turdus vanikorensis
- Wallacean island thrush, Turdus schlegelii
- White-headed island thrush, Turdus pritzbueri

== See also ==
- Thrush (bird)
- List of thrush species
