= Brown thrush =

Brown thrush may refer to:

- Brown-headed thrush (Turdus chrysolaus)
- Brown thrasher (Toxostoma rufum)
