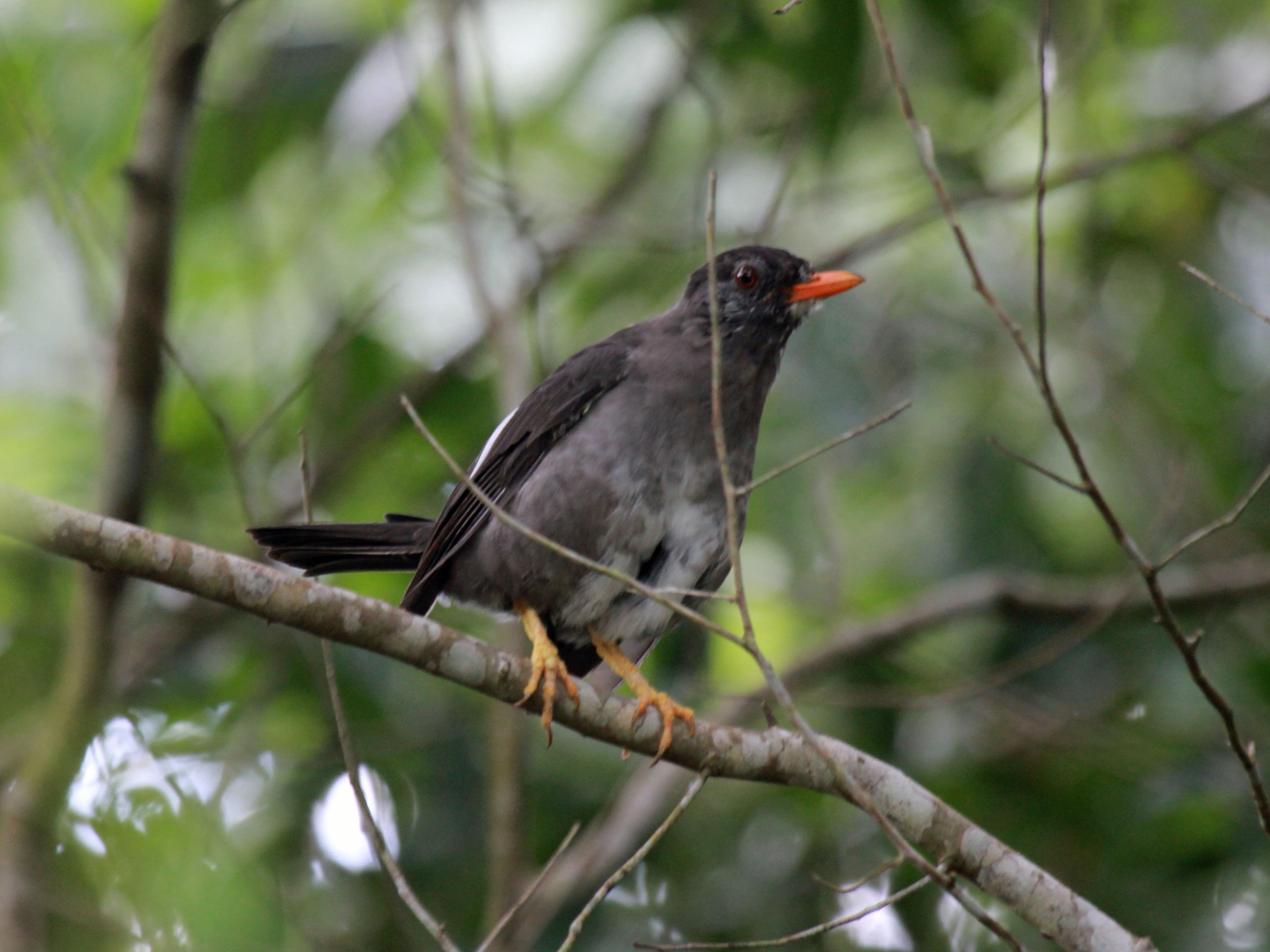

Conservation status
- Least Concern (IUCN 3.1)

Scientific classification
- Kingdom: Animalia
- Phylum: Chordata
- Class: Aves
- Order: Passeriformes
- Family: Turdidae
- Genus: Turdus
- Species: T. aurantius

Binomial name
- Turdus aurantius Gmelin, JF, 1789

= White-chinned thrush =

Species of bird

The white-chinned thrush, known in Jamaica as the hopping dick (Turdus aurantius) is a species of bird in the family Turdidae. It is endemic to Jamaica where it is common and widespread. Its natural habitats are subtropical or tropical moist lowland forests, subtropical or tropical moist montane forests, and heavily degraded former forest.

== Taxonomy ==
The white-chinned thrush was formally described in 1789 by the German naturalist Johann Friedrich Gmelin in his revised and expanded edition of Carl Linnaeus's Systema Naturae. He placed it with the thrushes in the genus Turdus and coined the binomial name Turdus aurantius. The scientific name comes from Latin Turdus meaning "thrush" and Modern Latin aurantius meaning "orange-coloured". Gmelin based his account on those by earlier authors. His list included John Ray in 1713, Hans Sloane in 1725, Mathurin Jacques Brisson in 1760, Comte de Buffon in 1775 and John Latham in 1783. The species is monotypic: no subspecies are recognised.

== Description ==
The white-chinned thrush in 24–26.5 cm (9.4–10.4 in) in overall length. The sexes are similar in appearance. The face, crown and nape are black. The rest of the upperparts dark grey. Two small broad white edges to the innermost greater coverts form a small white wing patch. The chin is whitish but the rest of the underparts are mid-grey with the palest feathers on the belly. The bill, legs and feet are orange. The eye is brown.

The only other thrush present in Jamaica is the white-eyed thrush. This lacks the white wing patch and the orange bill.

Local names for the bird in Jamaica include hopping dick and chick-me-chick.

== Behaviour ==
Breeding occurs between May and August. The nest is placed in a shrub and is an untidy cup of leaves, fibres and twigs that is lined with finer material. The clutch is 2–4 eggs which are dull whitish or pale green background with reddish brown spots. They are incubated by the female for 16 days. Two broods are usually raised.

== Gallery ==
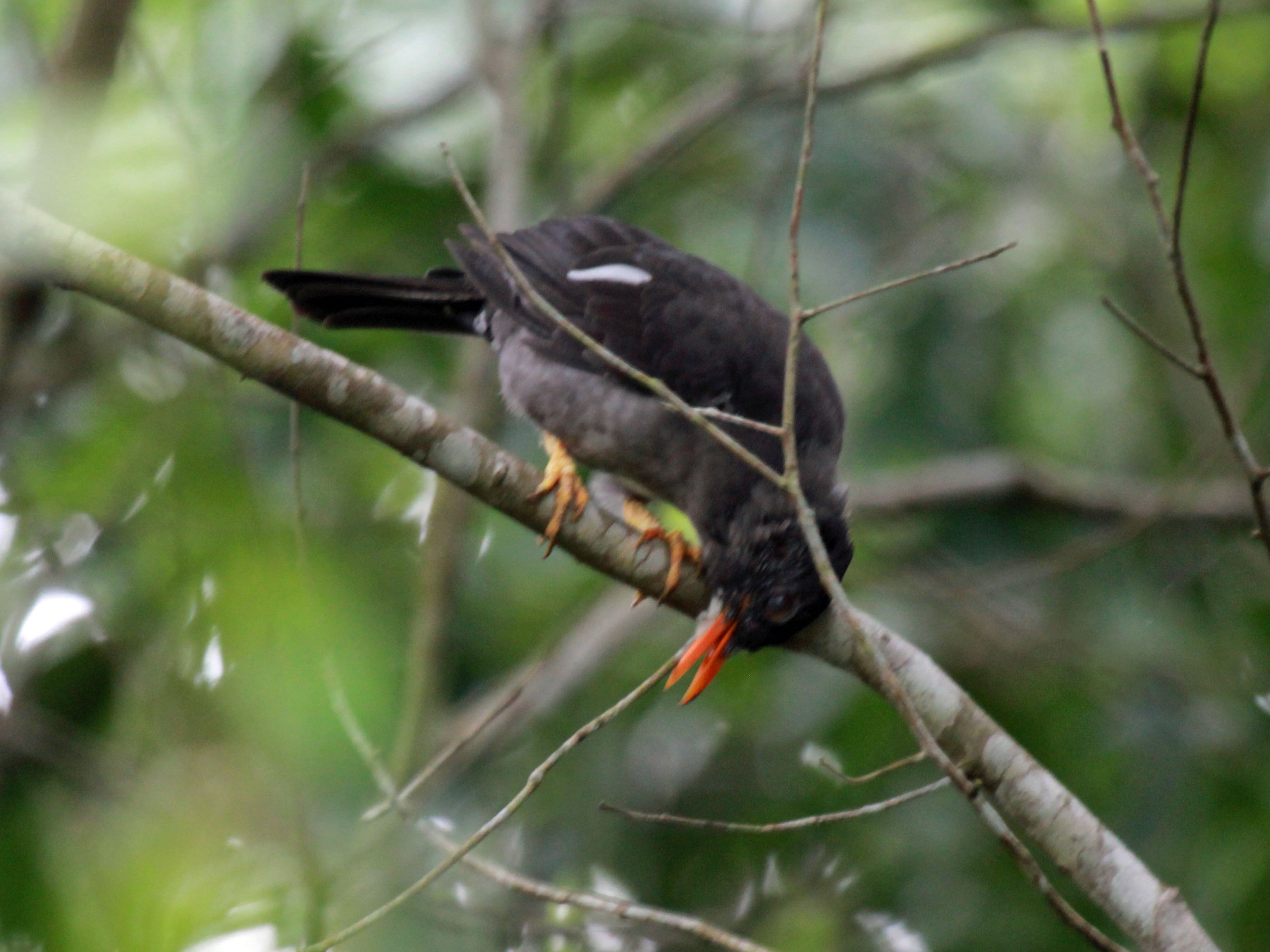
White-chinned thrush, Jamaica

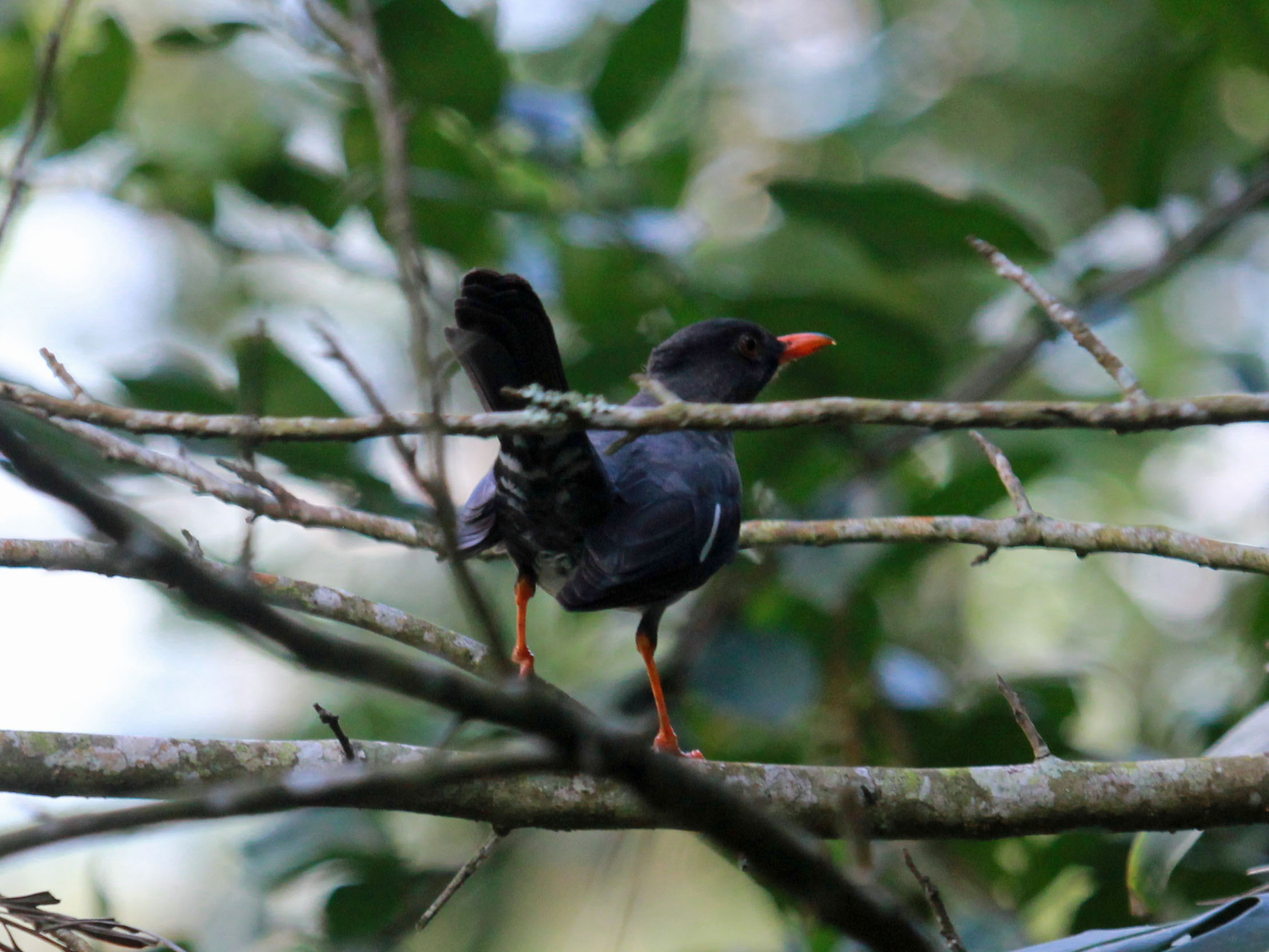
White-chinned thrush, Jamaica
