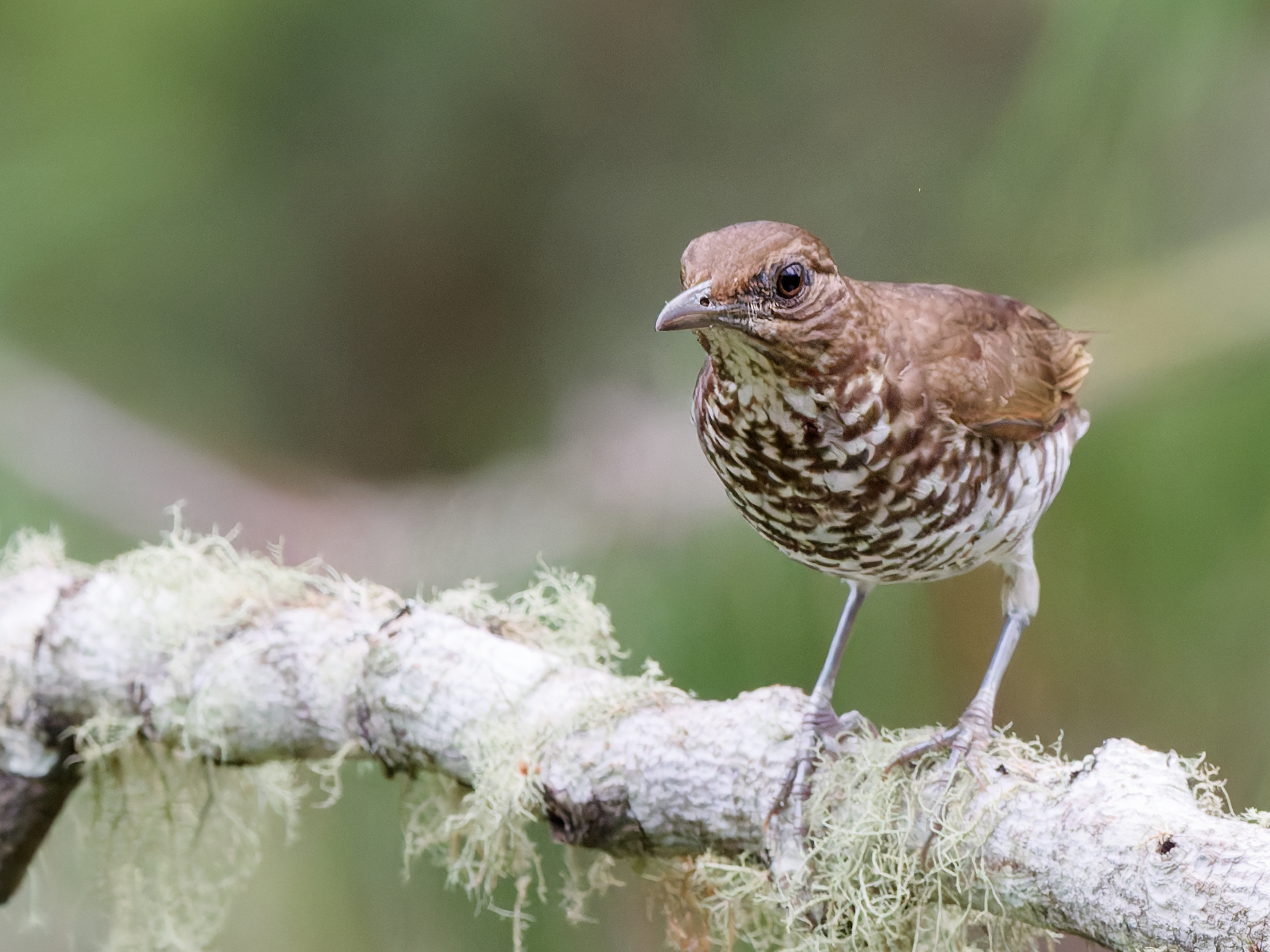

Conservation status
- Least Concern (IUCN 3.1)

Scientific classification
- Kingdom: Animalia
- Phylum: Chordata
- Class: Aves
- Order: Passeriformes
- Family: Turdidae
- Genus: Turdus
- Species: T. maranonicus

Binomial name
- Turdus maranonicus Taczanowski, 1880

Audio
- Maranon thrush song

= Marañón thrush =

Species of bird

The Maranon thrush (Note: The IOC and AviList spell the English name with no diacritics. Some other taxonomic systems and authors spell it Marañon or Marañón. The IOC is the Wikipedia standard for bird names, and AviList is the possible successor to it as the standard, so their spelling is used throughout.) (Turdus maranonicus) is a species of bird in the family Turdidae. It is found in Ecuador and Peru.

== Taxonomy and systematics ==
The Maranon thrush was originally described in 1880 with the binomial Turdus maranonicus and has retained it since then. It is monotypic.

== Description ==
The Maranon thrush is 21.5 to 23 cm (8.5 to 9.1 in) long. The sexes have the same plumage. Adults have a mostly rich brown head with a brown-streaked whitish throat. Their upperparts, wings, and tail are the same rich brown as the head. Their underparts are dull white with a brown scaly and spotted pattern on their breast and flanks. They have a dark iris, a grayish bill, and grayish legs and feet. Juveniles resemble adults with orange-buff spots and streaks on the upperparts and two spotted orange wing bars.

== Distribution and habitat ==
The Maranon thrush is found in the upper and middle basins of the Marañón River from extreme southern Ecuador into northern Peru to Huánuco Department. It primarily inhabits rather dry landscapes including dry forest and secondary forest, riparian forest, scrublands, and gardens. It also occurs at the edges of more humid forest and woodland. In elevation it ranges between 650 and 1,600 m (2,100 and 5,200 ft) in Ecuador and between 400 and 2,000 m (1,300 and 6,600 ft) in Peru.

== Behavior ==
=== Movement ===
The Maranon thrush is a year-round resident.

=== Feeding ===
The Maranon thrush's diet is not known. It forages mostly on the ground, often in very open areas like plowed fields and grassy areas.

=== Breeding ===
Nothing is known about the Maranon thrush's breeding biology.

=== Vocalization ===
The Maranon thrush's song is "a slow caroling similar to that of other Turdus, particularly [the] Black-billed Thrush, but does not seem to repeat phrases as does [the] Black-billed". Its calls are "a rising rzeet rzeet, a ringing tseet, and a mello wurk".

== Status ==
The IUCN has assessed the Maranon thrush as being of Least Concern. It has a restricted range; its population size is not known and is believed to be decreasing. No immediate threats have been identified. It is considered "relatively numerous" in Ecuador and "fairly common" in Peru. It occurs in Ecuador's Podocarpus National Park.
