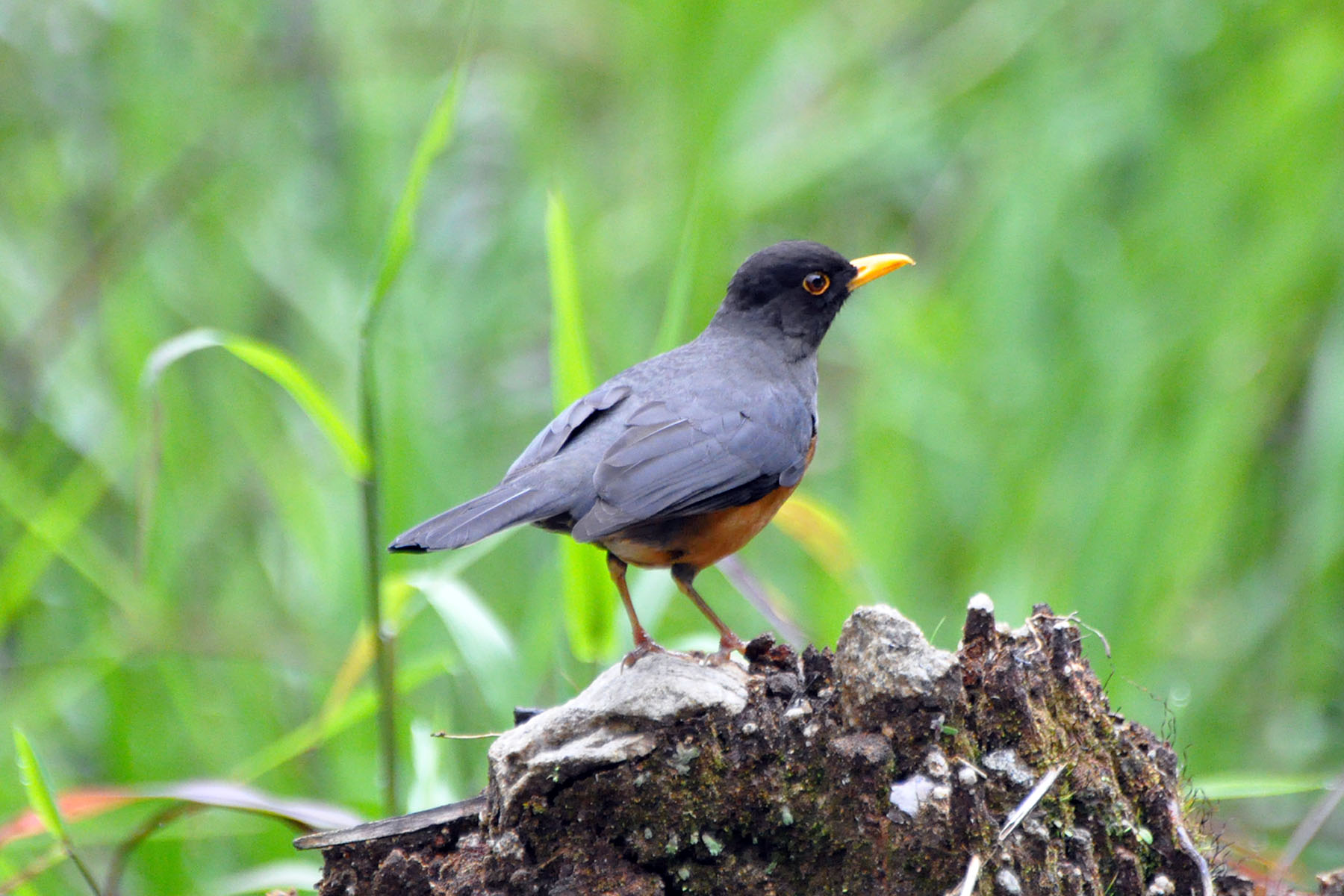
- Chestnut-bellied thrush in Guacamayos Ridge, Ecuador

Conservation status
- Least Concern (IUCN 3.1)

Scientific classification
- Kingdom: Animalia
- Phylum: Chordata
- Class: Aves
- Order: Passeriformes
- Family: Turdidae
- Genus: Turdus
- Species: T. fulviventris

Binomial name
- Turdus fulviventris Sclater, PL, 1858

= Chestnut-bellied thrush =

Species of bird

The chestnut-bellied thrush (Turdus fulviventris) is a species of bird in the family Turdidae. It is found in Colombia, Ecuador, Peru, and Venezuela. Its natural habitats are subtropical or tropical moist montane forests and heavily degraded former forest.

== Description ==
The chestnut-bellied thrush grows to a length of about 25 cm (10 in). The adult male has a black head, a black throat with some white streaking, a dark grey back and dusky wings and tail. The upper breast is pale grey and the lower breast and belly are rufous. The beak is yellow, the narrow eye ring is orange and the legs are dull yellow. The female is similar in appearance but rather duller. It is the only thrush in the genus Turdus with a rufous belly to be found in the northern Andes. The song is not often uttered, but consists of a series of disjointed phrases with some buzzes and short trills in between.

== Distribution and habitat ==
The chestnut-bellied thrush is native to northwestern South America. Its range includes western Venezuela, western Colombia, Ecuador, northern Peru and northwestern Bolivia. Its habitat is woodland and the canopy and edges of montane forests at altitudes between 1,400 and 2,600 m (4,600 and 8,500 ft).

== Ecology ==
This thrush often occurs singly and may also be seen in pairs, but does not usually join mixed flocks. Males may sing from high in the canopy, and both sexes often forage among the twigs and branches. It sometimes descends to ground level, particularly besides roads and trails, and turns over the leaf litter, searching for invertebrates, and may remain in one area for some time.

== Status ==
The chestnut-bellied thrush is described as an uncommon species and the population is thought to be declining slowly as the bird's woodland habitat is degraded. However, it has a very large range and presumably a large total population, and the International Union for Conservation of Nature has assessed its conservation status as being of "least concern".
