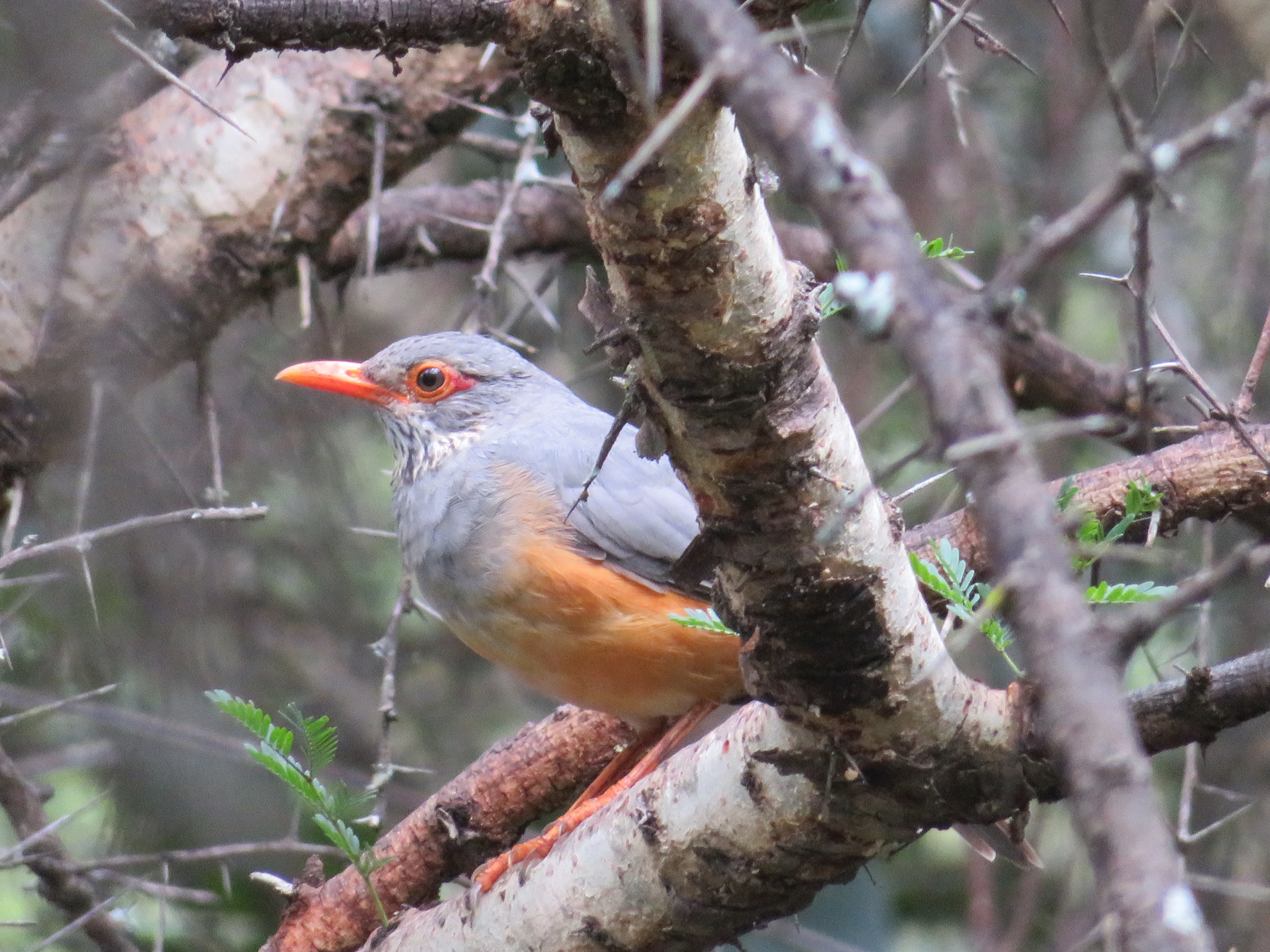

Conservation status
- Least Concern (IUCN 3.1)

Scientific classification
- Kingdom: Animalia
- Phylum: Chordata
- Class: Aves
- Order: Passeriformes
- Family: Turdidae
- Genus: Turdus
- Species: T. tephronotus

Binomial name
- Turdus tephronotus Cabanis, 1878

= Bare-eyed thrush =

Species of bird

The bare-eyed thrush (Turdus tephronotus) is a species of bird in the family Turdidae. It is found in Ethiopia, Kenya, Somalia, and Tanzania.

Its natural habitats are dry savanna and subtropical or tropical dry shrubland. It breeds during the rainy season.

This species has a very large range, and hence does not approach the thresholds for Vulnerable under the range size criterion (Extent of Occurrence <20,000 km2 combined with a declining or fluctuating range size, habitat extent/quality, or population size and a small number of locations or severe fragmentation). The population trend is not known, but the population is not believed to be decreasing sufficiently rapidly to approach the thresholds under the population trend criterion (>30% decline over ten years or three generations). The population size has not been quantified, but it is not believed to approach the thresholds for Vulnerable under the population size criterion (<10,000 mature individuals with a continuing decline estimated to be >10% in ten years or three generations, or with a specified population structure). For these reasons the species is evaluated as Least Concern.
