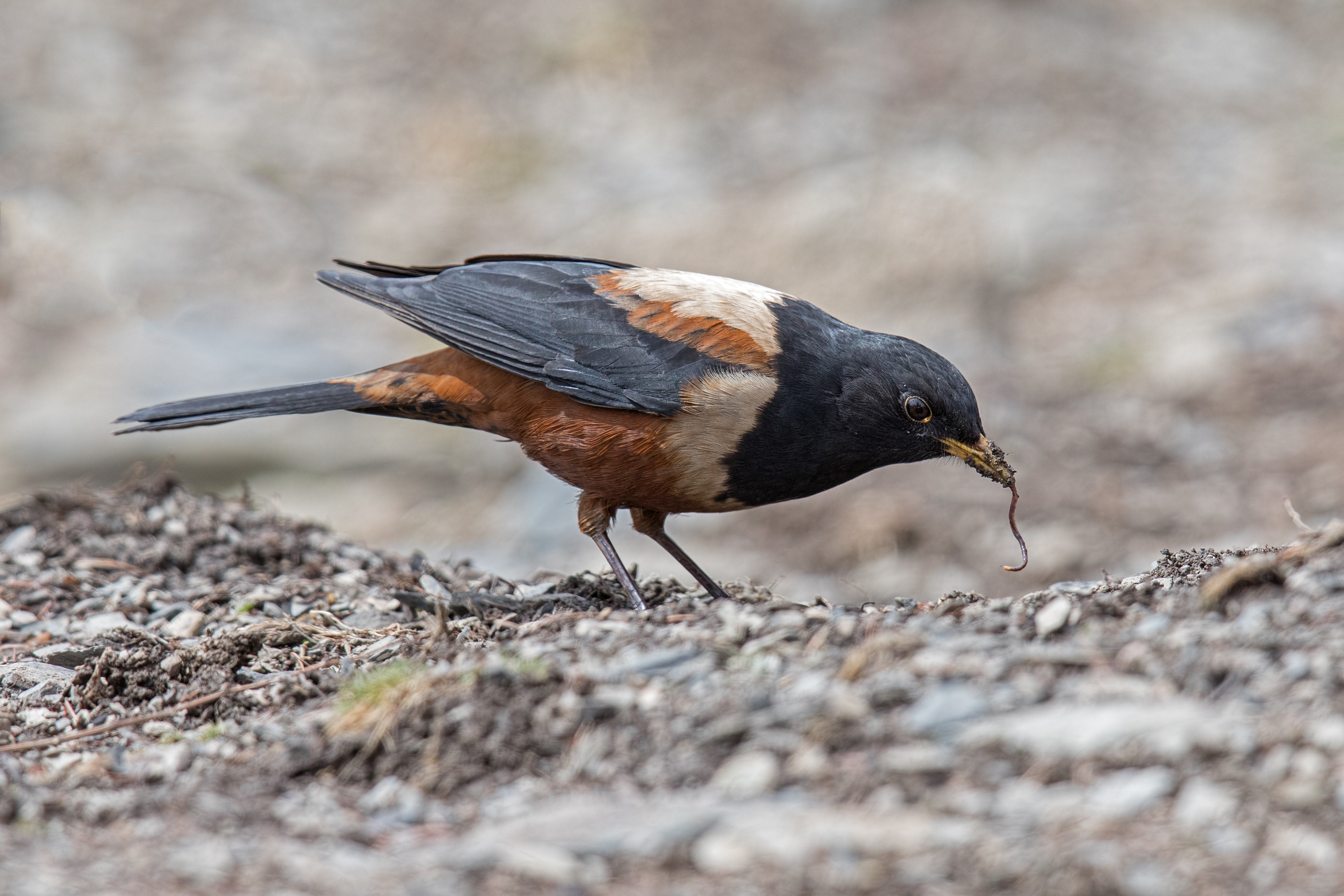
- White-backed thrush in Garzê Tibetan Autonomous Prefecture, Sichuan, China

Conservation status
- Least Concern (IUCN 3.1)

Scientific classification
- Kingdom: Animalia
- Phylum: Chordata
- Class: Aves
- Order: Passeriformes
- Family: Turdidae
- Genus: Turdus
- Species: T. kessleri

Binomial name
- Turdus kessleri (Przewalski, 1876)

= White-backed thrush =

Species of bird

The white-backed thrush or Kessler's thrush (Turdus kessleri) is a species of bird in the family Turdidae. It is primarily resident or a short-distance altitudinal migrant, found in central China in Gansu, Qinghai, Sichuan, eastern Tibet, and northwestern Yunnan, and also a scarce winter visitor in Bhutan, northeasternmost India (Arunachal Pradesh and Sikkim), and eastern Nepal. It breeds in alpine scrub on rocky sites at altitudes of 3600–4500 metres, and descends down to 2100 metres, rarely to 1500 metres, in winter.

It is a large thrush, 28 cm long (same size as a mistle thrush). The male has a black head, wings, and tail, and a pink body, dark pink below and pale pink to nearly white on the mantle (thus superficially resembling a rosy starling in plumage pattern, though larger and longer-tailed than that). The female is similar but drabber, with a dark brown head and the pink tinged greyer. Juveniles are similar to adult females, but with pale streaks on the head. It is gregarious, forming flocks particularly in winter, but also on the breeding grounds, and often joins flocks of dusky thrush and red-throated thrush. It is omnivorous, feeding on insects, earthworms, and berries, with juniper cones ("berries") particularly important in winter.
