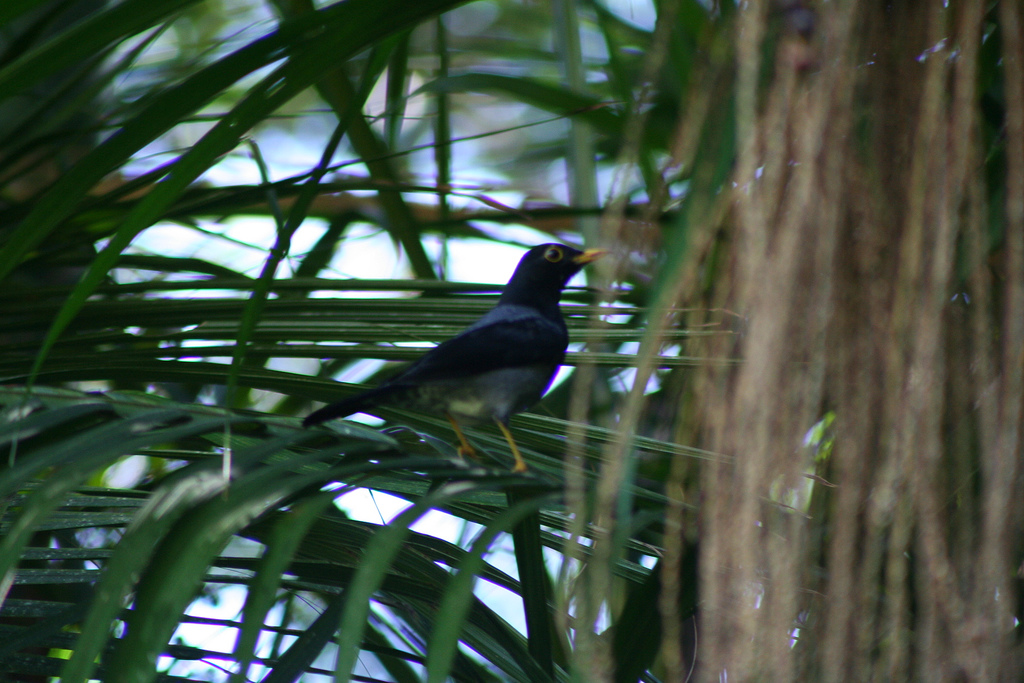
- Yellow-legged thrush, (Platycichla flavipes)

Scientific classification
- Domain: Eukaryota
- Kingdom: Animalia
- Phylum: Chordata
- Class: Aves
- Order: Passeriformes
- Family: Turdidae
- Genus: Platycichla; Baird, 1848

Species
- P. leucops P. flavipes

= Platycichla =

Genus of birds

Platycichla is a small disputed genus of tropical South American thrushes. It contains just two species:

- Pale-eyed thrush, Platycichla (Turdus) leucops
- Yellow-legged thrush, Platycichla (Turdus) flavipes

These are medium-sized (20–23 cm long) birds of humid mountain forests. Their nests are a typical thrush's lined cup of twigs.

In both species the male is mainly dark grey or black with yellow legs and bill, and the female essentially warm brown above and paler below.

The Platycichla thrushes mainly feed in trees and bushes on fruit and some insects. They are shy species, and the females in particular is difficult to see, since she does not sing. The song of the male consists of melodic musical phrases.

The main argument for separating this genus from Turdus is the smaller size of the former compared to most members of the latter. Similarities in plumage, vocalization, behavior, and genetics lead to the South American Classification Committee eliminating Platycichla (instead including the two species in Turdus) following a proposal in 2006.
