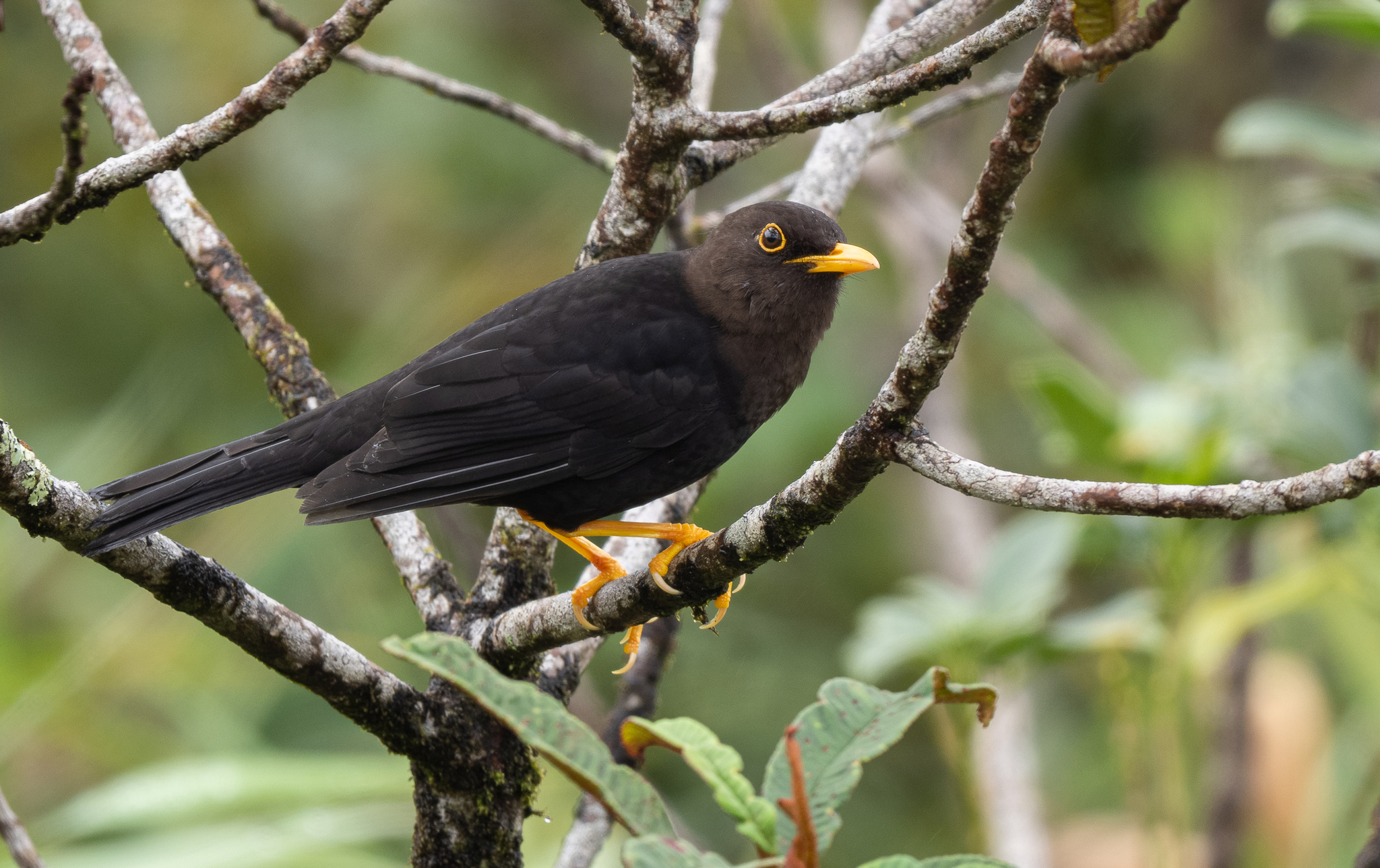
- Nominate subspecies T. t. thomassoni in Ilocos Norte

Scientific classification
- Kingdom: Animalia
- Phylum: Chordata
- Class: Aves
- Order: Passeriformes
- Family: Turdidae
- Genus: Turdus
- Species: T. thomassoni

Binomial name
- Turdus thomassoni (Seebohm, 1894)

= Luzon island thrush =

Species of bird

Luzon island thrush (Turdus thomassoni) is a species of passerine in the family Turdidae. It is endemic to the island of Luzon in the Philippines. It was formerly considered to be two separate subspecies of Island thrush until 2024 when it was classified as a distinct species by the IOC and Clements checklist.

== Description and taxonomy ==
This species is sexually dimorphic. The male Luzon island thrush is glossy back with a dark brownish gray hood on head and upper breast and white streaks in vent. The female is duller and more uniform dark with slight rufous underparts and a lighter vent.

The Luzon island thrush was first described as Merula thomassoni by ornithologist Henry Seebohm in 1894. In 1907, the subspecies T. t. mayonensis was described as Merula mayonensis by ornithologist Edgar Alexander Mearns, its binomial name being a reference to the mountain where it was first collected, Mount Mayon. Both were later considered to be subspecies of Island thrush as T. p. thomassoni and T. p. mayonensis. In 2024 the two subspecies were classified as one distinct species based on morphological and phylogenic evidence following a 2023 study and based on this, it is the second most divergent taxon in the species complex after the Mindoro island thrush.

=== Subspecies ===
Two subspecies are recognized:

- Turdus thomassoni thomassoni (Seebohm, 1894) – Mountains of northern Luzon
- Turdus thomassoni mayonensis (Mearns, 1907) – Mountains of southern Luzon

== Ecology and behavior ==
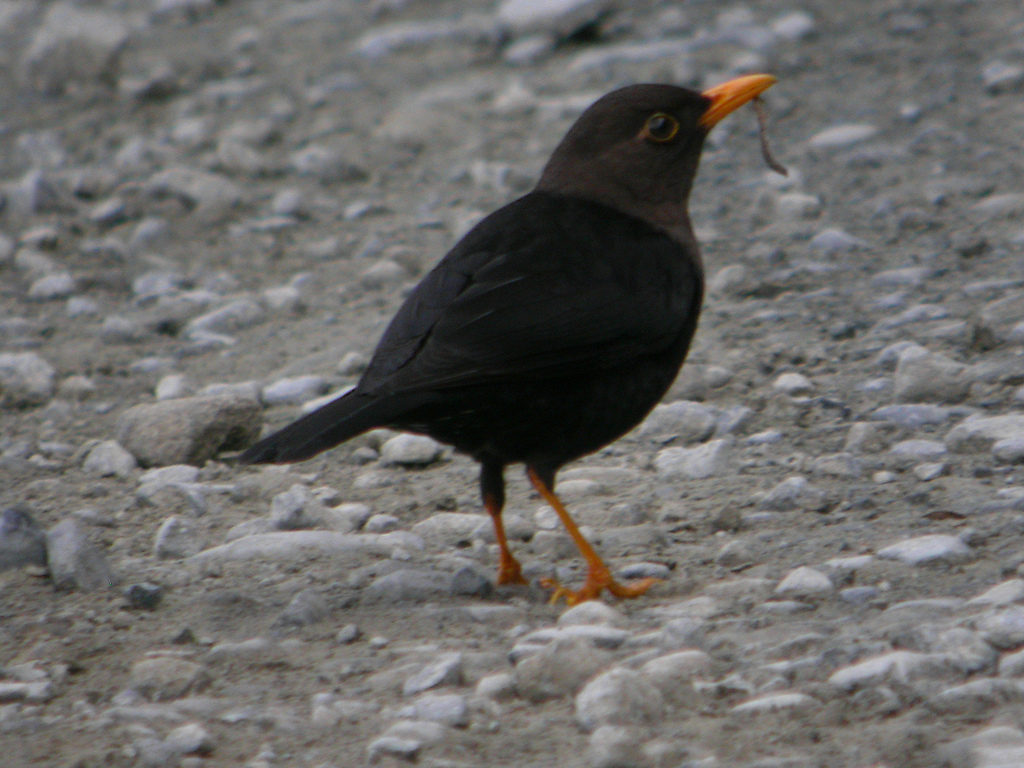
Male of the nominate subspecies T. t. thomassoni on Mount Polis

This is a newly split species and there are no specific studies yet for the Luzon island thrush. The island thrush has a varied and generalist diet taking a range of invertebrates such as insects including beetles, spiders, snails, earthworms, as well as carrion and even small reptiles. It will also take fruit and seeds, depending on what is locally available. It is observed foraging on leaf litter and low branches in dense cover, clearings and even roads.

The only specific information known about the Luzon island thrush is that it has been observed feeding on berries.

Breeding season is believed to be April to May but birds with enlarged gonads have been collected from February to October. The Island thrush species complex makes cup shaped nests of grass, roots, tendrils, twigs, bark and moss. These nests are typically placed low and close to a clearing. Clutch size is 1 to 3 eggs but is usually 2. Eggs are greenish blue with brown spots. Incubation takes 18 days and fledgling takes 17 to 19 days.

== Habitat and conservation status ==
It occurs in tropical moist montane forest and forest edges above altitudes of 1,000 m.

This is a newly split species and has yet to be assessed by the International Union for Conservation of Nature. This bird is believed to be common in its habitat. However, like all other forest species in the Philippines, its population is still likely on the decline. This species' main threat is habitat loss due to deforestation through mining, logging and conversion of habitat into farmland. Mossy forests of the Cordillera Central are threatened by conversion to agricultural land, primarily for vegetable production. Forest cover in the Sierra Madre has declined by 83% since the 1930s.

It occurs in a few protected areas like Mount Pulag National Park, Mount Polis, Mounts Banahaw–San Cristobal Protected Landscape, Mount Isarog, Mount Mayon, and Mount Bulusan.
