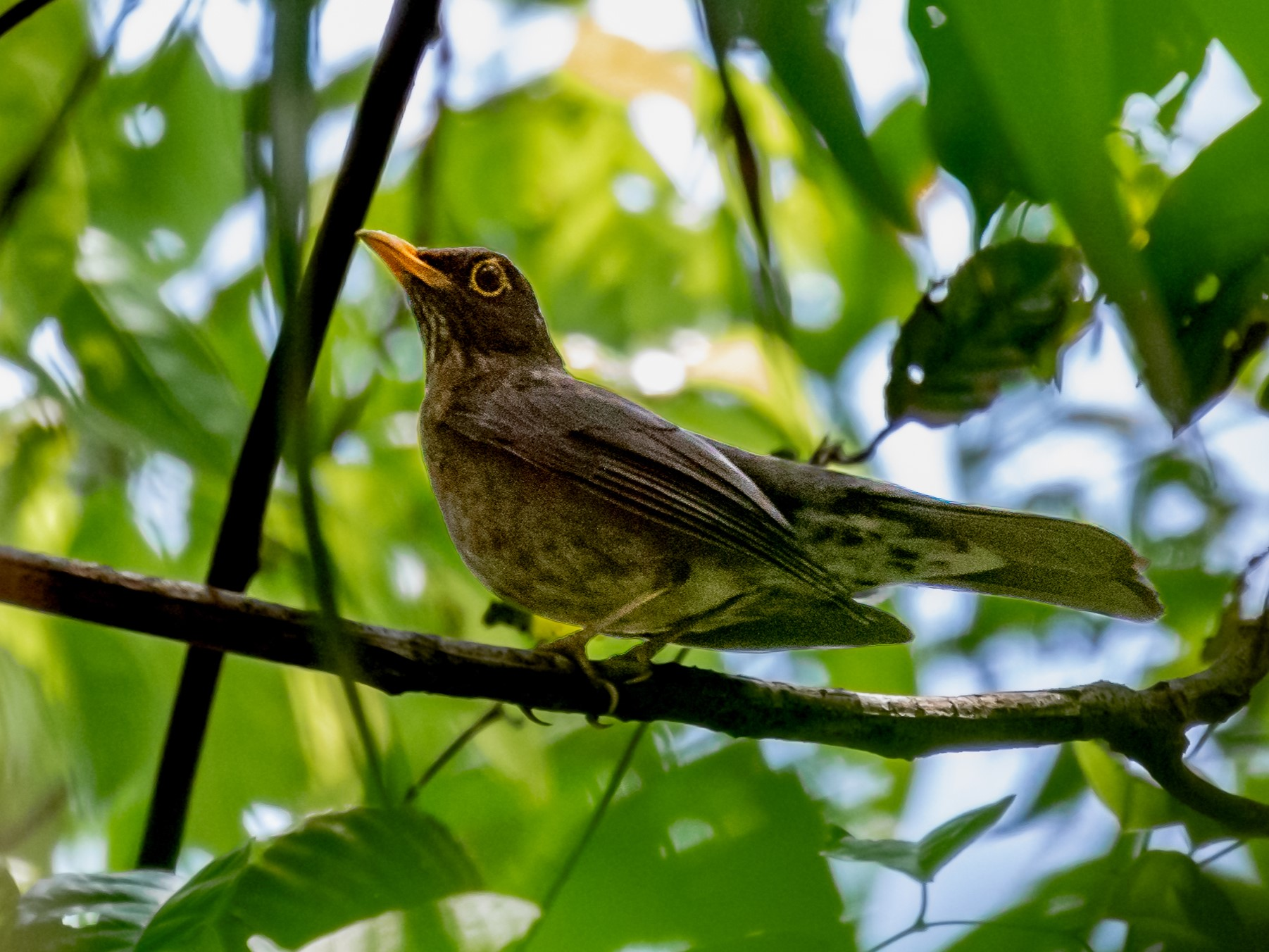

Conservation status
- Least Concern (IUCN 3.1)

Scientific classification
- Kingdom: Animalia
- Phylum: Chordata
- Class: Aves
- Order: Passeriformes
- Family: Turdidae
- Genus: Turdus
- Species: T. lawrencii

Binomial name
- Turdus lawrencii Coues, 1880

= Lawrence's thrush =

Species of bird

Lawrence's thrush (Turdus lawrencii) is a species of bird in the family Turdidae. It is found in Bolivia, Brazil, Colombia, Ecuador, Peru, and Venezuela.

== Taxonomy and systematics ==
Lawrence's thrush was originally described as Turdus brunneus. However, that binomial was already assigned to another species, so by the principle of priority Elliott Coues suggested that it be named Turdus lawrencii in 1880. This assignment lay dormant until T. S. Palmer publicized it in 1897.

Lawrence's thrush is monotypic.

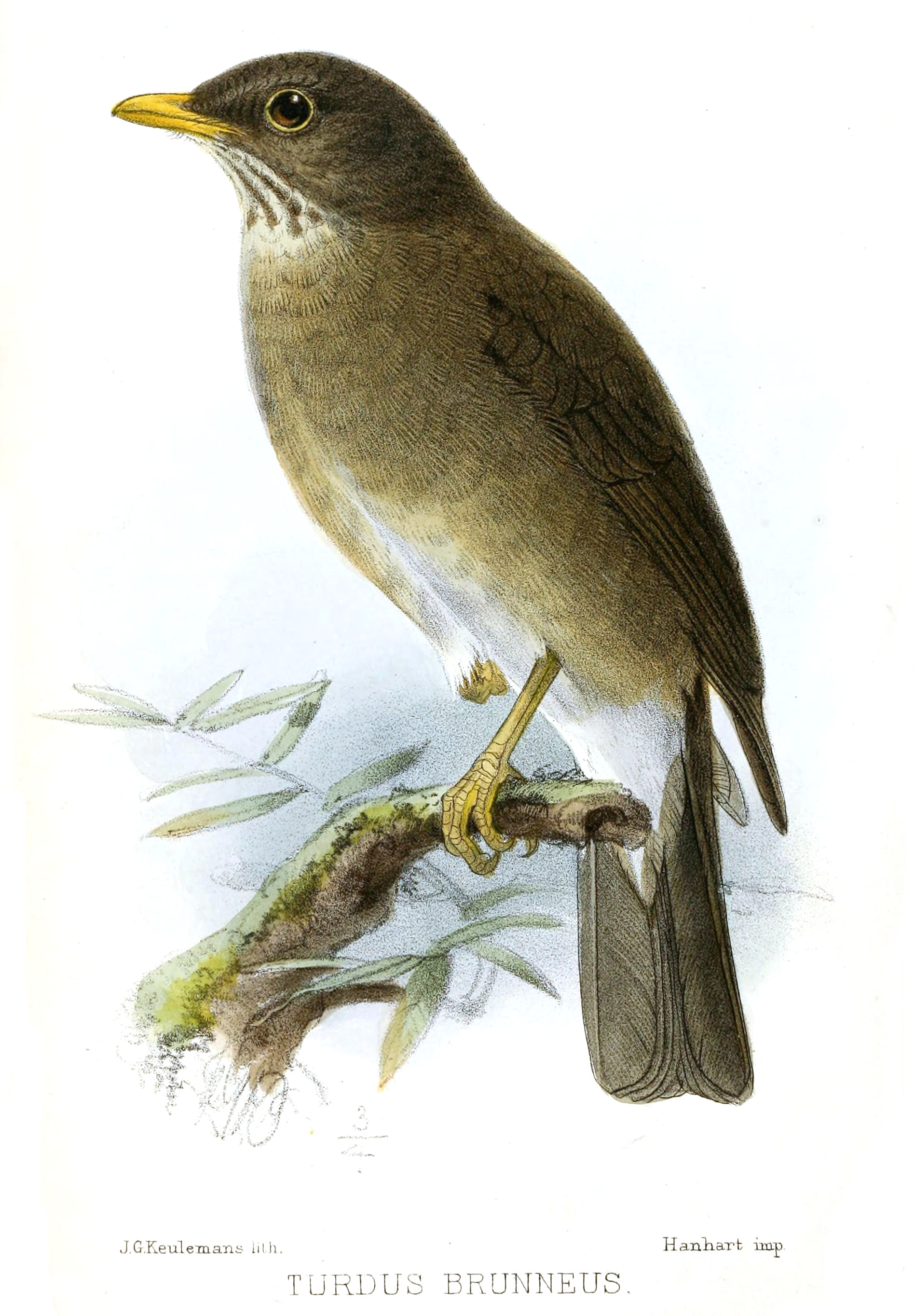
Illustration by John Gerrard Keulemans, 1878

== Description ==
Lawrence's thrush is 21.5 to 23 cm (8.5 to 9.1 in) long and weighs about 73 g (2.6 oz). The species is sexually dimorphic. Adult males have a mostly olive-brown head with a rufous tinge. They have a yellow eye-ring and a white throat with dark streaks. Their bill is yellow. Their upperparts, wings, and tail are rufous-tinged olive-brown. Their breast and flanks are rufous-drab and their belly and vent white. Adult females are similar to males but have a paler breast and flanks and a duller bill. Both sexes have a dark iris and pinkish brown legs and feet. Juveniles have orange-buff streaks on their upperparts and two orange wing bars. Their underparts are buffy with heavy brown mottling.

== Distribution and habitat ==
Lawrence's thrush is a bird of the upper Amazon Basin. In Venezuela it is found in southeastern Bolívar and far southwestern Amazonas states. From Amazonas its range continues west and south through southern Colombia, eastern Ecuador, and eastern Peru into extreme northwestern Bolivia. From Venezuela its range also extends into northwestern Brazil. From the other countries its range extends east across Brazil south of the Amazon River to Tocantins with a southern boundary in Mato Grosso. Though one source includes Guyana in its range the South American Classification Committee has no records in that country.

Lawrence's thrush inhabits humid forest, primarily terra firme (including that on sandy soil) and also várzea and the ecotone between them. In elevation it ranges up to 1,200 m (3,900 ft) in Venezuela, to 500 m (1,600 ft) in Colombia, to 600 m (2,000 ft) in Ecuador, to 700 m (2,300 ft) in Peru, and to 800 m (2,600 ft) in Brazil.

== Behavior ==
=== Movement ===
Lawrence's thrush is a sedentary year-round resident.

=== Feeding ===
The diet of Lawrence's thrush has not been studied but is known to include fruit. It forages mostly from the forest's mid-level to its canopy though sometimes on the ground. It occasionally joins mixed-species feeding flocks.

=== Breeding ===
The breeding season of Lawrence's thrush has not been defined but is believed to span at least November to March, in the rainy season. Its nest is a cup made from grass and mud typically wedged between a bromeliad and a tree trunk. Nests have been found between about 10 and 20 m (35 and 65 ft) above the ground. One nest held two nestlings. Nothing else is known about the species' breeding biology.

=== Vocalization ===
Lawrence's thrush is "one of the most extraordinary avian vocal mimics on Earth". It is known to mimic at least 170 other bird species and some frogs and insects as well. It sings from a hidden perch in or above the forest's mid-level. It sings a series of mimic phrases with some of its own interspersed; one bout contained the songs of 51 other species. Some individuals sing all day. The species also makes "ku, kup, kit? or kup-kip?, shrill peer!, mournful perwheee, abrupt weechee and loud peep peep peep!" calls.

== Status ==
The IUCN has assessed Lawrence's thrush as being of Least Concern. It has an extremely large range; its population size is not known and is believed to be decreasing. No immediate threats have been identified. It is considered rare and local in Venezuela, fairly common in Colombia and Ecuador, and "uncommon to rare" in Brazil.
