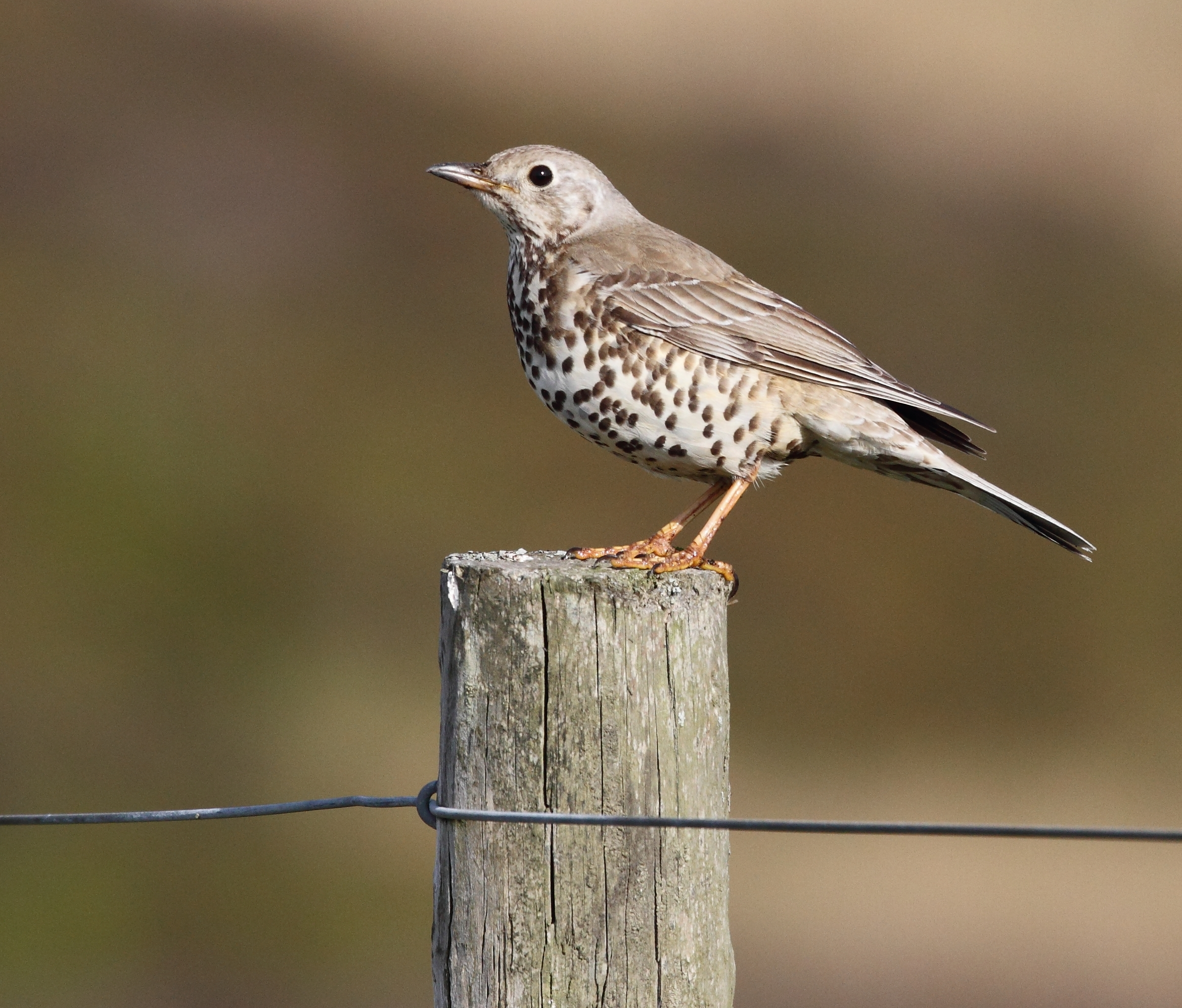
- Mistle thrush (T. viscivorus), the type species of the genus

Scientific classification
- Kingdom: Animalia
- Phylum: Chordata
- Class: Aves
- Order: Passeriformes
- Family: Turdidae
- Genus: Turdus; Linnaeus, 1758

Type species
- Turdus viscivorus

Species
- See text

= Turdus =

Genus of birds

Turdus is a genus of medium-sized mostly insectivorous or omnivorous birds in the wider thrush family, Turdidae. The genus name Turdus is Latin for 'thrush'.

Most of the species are called thrushes; the term thrush is also used for many other birds in the family Turdidae, as well as for a few species belonging to other families. Some Old World species with fully or largely black plumage are called blackbirds, and one, the ring ouzel, still retains the Old English name ouzel, which, until the 17th century, was also used (as "black ouzel") for the common blackbird; it is cognate with the German name Amsel for the same species. Some New World species are called robins, the best known of which is the American robin. Two other species have their own distinct names without "thrush", fieldfare and redwing, derived from behavioural characteristics and plumage features, respectively.

The genus has a cosmopolitan distribution, with species in Europe, Asia, Africa, and the Americas. Several species have colonised oceanic islands, and two European species have been introduced by man into Australia and New Zealand.

All the species are uniform in size and structure, with the great majority between 22–28 cm long; the smallest (Vanikoro island thrush) being 17–19 cm, and the largest (great thrush) being 28–33 cm. All have slender, medium-length bills. Plumage is far more variable; the only fully shared character is that the recently fledged juveniles are spotted on the breast and streaked on the back. Adult colours range from the "classical" thrush pattern of a plain brown back and a spotted breast (e.g. mistle thrush, song thrush), through all-brown (e.g. clay-colored thrush, black-billed thrush) or all-black (e.g. common blackbird, glossy-black thrush), pied (e.g. ring ouzel, white-collared blackbird), to orange- to red-breasted, either subtly (e.g. rufous-bellied thrush, grey-backed thrush) or boldly (e.g. American robin, red-throated thrush). Some show sexual dimorphism with the males brighter or more intensely coloured than the often browner females, while in others, the sexes are identical in plumage. All are omnivorous, with a mixed diet of invertebrates, fruit, and small seeds. The temperate northern hemisphere species are migratory to a greater or lesser extent to avoid the harsh freezing winters of northern Eurasia and North America, while the subtropical, tropical, and southern hemisphere species are generally nonmigratory. Many, or most, are noted for their melodious songs. Almost all occur in habitats with trees and shrubs, but many will also use open ground away from trees; some are highly adapted to rocky mountainous habitats, using steep slopes and rocks adeptly in predator avoidance. Many have adapted well to human presence and are common in urban and suburban gardens, while some are shy and avoid human presence, particularly where there is any history of bird hunting.

While some species have been split out of Turdus, the thrushes formerly separated in the genera Cataponera, Cichlherminia, Nesocichla, Platycichla and Psophocichla by various authors have been restored to the present genus in recent years.

== Taxonomy and systematics ==
The genus Turdus was formally named by the Swedish naturalist Carl Linnaeus in 1758 in the tenth edition of his Systema Naturae. The type species was subsequently designated as the mistle thrush. The name Turdus is the Latin word for a "thrush".

=== Current species ===
The genus contains 105 extant species of which two are recently extinct:

Image	Common name	Scientific name	Distribution
	Groundscraper thrush	Turdus litsitsirupa	Angola, Botswana, the Democratic Republic of the Congo, Eswatini, Malawi, Mozambique, Namibia, South Africa, Tanzania, Zambia, and Zimbabwe
	Ethiopian thrush	Turdus simensis	Ethiopia, Eritrea
	Chinese thrush	Turdus mupinensis	China and far northern Vietnam
	Song thrush	Turdus philomelos	Europe, North Africa and the Middle East
	Mistle thrush	Turdus viscivorus	Europe and temperate Asia
	African thrush	Turdus pelios	from Senegal and Gambia in the west to South Sudan, Ethiopia and Eritrea south to north-western Zambia and western Angola
	Príncipe thrush	Turdus xanthorhynchus	Príncipe
	São Tomé thrush	Turdus olivaceofuscus	São Tomé
	Abyssinian thrush	Turdus abyssinicus	Africa from South Sudan south to northern Mozambique
	Taita thrush	Turdus helleri	Taita Hills in Kenya
A small brown bird with a white underbelly standing on some dirt or mulch	Usambara thrush	Turdus roehli	Tanzania
	Olive thrush	Turdus olivaceus	Tanzania and Zimbabwe in the north to the Cape of Good Hope
	Kurrichane thrush	Turdus libonyana	Angola, Botswana, Burundi, Democratic Republic of the Congo, Eswatini, Lesotho, Malawi, Mozambique, Namibia, South Africa, Tanzania, Zambia, and Zimbabwe
	Comoro thrush	Turdus bewsheri	Comoros Islands
	Bare-eyed thrush	Turdus tephronotus	Ethiopia, Kenya, Somalia, and Tanzania
	Karoo thrush	Turdus smithi	South Africa, where it is present in Little Namaqualand, the Karoo and Northern Cape, Free State, Gauteng, Limpopo, Mpumalanga and parts of the North West Province
	Somali thrush or Somali blackbird	Turdus ludoviciae	Somalia
	Chinese blackbird	Turdus mandarinus	south, central and east China
	Redwing	Turdus iliacus	Europe and Asia, from Iceland south to northernmost Scotland, and east through Scandinavia, the Baltic States, northern Poland and Belarus, and through most of Russia to about 165°E in Chukotka Autonomous Okrug
	Common blackbird	Turdus merula	temperate Eurasia, North Africa, the Canary Islands, and South Asia
	Yemen thrush	Turdus menachensis	Middle East
	Taiwan thrush	Turdus niveiceps	Taiwan
	Grey-winged blackbird	Turdus boulboul	south-eastern Asia from the Himalayas to northern Vietnam
	Indian blackbird	Turdus simillimus	India and Sri Lanka
	Tickell's thrush	Turdus unicolor	Himalayas, and peninsular India
	Black-breasted thrush	Turdus dissimilis	south-western China
	Japanese thrush	Turdus cardis	central China and Japan and northern Laos and Vietnam
	Grey-backed thrush	Turdus hortulorum	north-eastern China and Russia Far East and winters in southern China and northern Vietnam
	Eyebrowed thrush	Turdus obscurus	Siberia south to China and Southeast Asia
	Pale thrush	Turdus pallidus	south-east Siberia, north-east China and Korea and may breed in Japan
	Grey-sided thrush	Turdus feae	north-east China and migrating to subtropical or tropical moist montane forest in India, and Indochina
	Brown-headed thrush	Turdus chrysolaus	Sakhalin, the Kuril Islands, Japan, Ryukyu Islands, Taiwan, Hainan and the northern Philippines
	Izu thrush	Turdus celaenops	Izu and Ryukyu Islands of Japan
	Mindoro island thrush	Turdus mindorensis (split from T. poliocephalus)	montane Mindoro (northwest Philippines)
	Luzon island thrush	Turdus thomassoni (split from T. poliocephalus)	montane Luzon (north Philippines)
	Mindanao island thrush	Turdus nigrorum (split from T. poliocephalus)	montane Negros and Mindanao (Philippines)
	Wallacean island thrush	Turdus schlegelii (split from T. poliocephalus)	montane Sulawesi and Timor
	Christmas island thrush	Turdus erythropleurus (split from T. poliocephalus)	Christmas Island
	Sundaic island thrush	Turdus javanicus (split from T. poliocephalus)	montane Sumatra, Java and Borneo
	Moluccan island thrush	Turdus deningeri (split from T. poliocephalus)	montane Taliabu and Seram
	Papuan island thrush	Turdus papuensis (split from T. poliocephalus)	montane New Guinea and Goodenough Island (D'Entrecasteaux Islands)
	Bismarck island thrush	Turdus heinrothi (split from T. poliocephalus)	Bismarck Archipelago
	Bougainville island thrush	Turdus bougainvillei (split from T. poliocephalus)	montane Bougainville Island (north Solomon Islands)
	Solomons island thrush	Turdus kulambangrae (split from T. poliocephalus)	montane Kolombangara and Guadalcanal (Solomon Islands)
	Vanikoro island thrush	Turdus vanikorensis (split from T. poliocephalus)	Vanuatu and Utupua
	White-headed island thrush	Turdus pritzbueri (split from T. poliocephalus)	south Vanuatu
	New Caledonian island thrush	Turdus xanthopus (split from T. poliocephalus)	New Caledonia and satellites
	† Tasman Sea island thrush	Turdus poliocephalus	Lord Howe Island and Norfolk Island (east of Australia) (extinct)
	Samoan island thrush	Turdus samoensis (split from T. poliocephalus)	Savaiʻi and Upolu in Samoa
	Fiji island thrush	Turdus ruficeps (split from T. poliocephalus)	Fiji
	Tibetan blackbird	Turdus maximus	Himalayas from northern Pakistan to south-eastern Tibet
	White-backed thrush	Turdus kessleri	central China
	Fieldfare	Turdus pilaris	Norway, Sweden, Finland, Belgium, Eastern France, Germany, Switzerland, Austria, the Czech Republic, Slovakia, Hungary, Poland and Siberia as far east as Transbaikal, the Aldan River, the Tian Shan Mountains in North West China, Anatolia, Israel, Iran and Northwest India, and occasionally north-east India. It is a vagrant to Iceland, Greenland, Spitsbergen, the Canary Islands, the Balearic Islands, Madeira, Corsica, Sardinia, Sicily, Malta and Cyprus. It is a very rare breeder in the British Isles, but winters in large numbers in the United Kingdom, Southern Europe, North Africa and the Middle East.
	Ring ouzel	Turdus torquatus	western and central Europe and also in the Caucasus and in the Scandinavian mountains
	Black-throated thrush	Turdus atrogularis	east of Europe to Western Siberia and north-west Mongolia
	Red-throated thrush	Turdus ruficollis	Asia
	Dusky thrush	Turdus eunomus	south to south-east Asia, principally in China and neighbouring countries
	Naumann's thrush	Turdus naumanni	South Asia to Southeast Asia
	Chestnut thrush	Turdus rubrocanus	western Himalayas and central to south-western China; it winters in Eastern Himalaya and northern Southeast Asia
	White-collared blackbird	Turdus albocinctus	Bangladesh, Bhutan, India, Myanmar, Nepal and Pakistan
	Sulawesi thrush	Turdus turdoides	Sulawesi Island in Indonesia
	American robin	Turdus migratorius	North America, from Alaska and Canada southward to northern Florida and Mexico
	Black thrush	Turdus infuscatus	El Salvador, Guatemala, Honduras, and Mexico
	Rufous-collared thrush	Turdus rufitorques	Central America, south of the Isthmus of Tehuantepec, occurring in El Salvador, Guatemala, Honduras, and Chiapas state in Mexico
	Sooty thrush	Turdus nigrescens	Costa Rica and western Panama
	Western red-legged thrush	Turdus plumbeus	The Bahamas, Cayman Brac, Cuba
	Eastern red-legged thrush	Turdus ardosiaceus	Dominica, Hispaniola (Dominican Republic and Haiti), Puerto Rico
	Grand Cayman thrush	†Turdus ravidus	Grand Cayman (extinct since 1938)
	White-chinned thrush	Turdus aurantius	Jamaica
	Forest thrush	Turdus lherminieri	Dominica, Guadeloupe, Montserrat, and Saint Lucia
	Mountain thrush	Turdus plebejus	southern Mexico to western Panama
	Pale-eyed thrush	Turdus leucops	Bolivia, Brazil, Colombia, Ecuador, Guyana, Peru, and Venezuela
	White-eyed thrush	Turdus jamaicensis	Jamaica
	La Selle thrush	Turdus swalesi	Hispaniola (Dominican Republic and Haiti)
	Chestnut-bellied thrush	Turdus fulviventris	western Venezuela, western Colombia, Ecuador, northern Peru and north-western Bolivia
	Plumbeous-backed thrush	Turdus reevei	Ecuador and Peru
	Chiguanco thrush	Turdus chiguanco	Ecuador and the Altiplano
	Andean slaty thrush	Turdus nigriceps	north-west Argentina, Bolivia, Ecuador and Peru
	Glossy-black thrush	Turdus serranus	northern Venezuela to north-western Argentina
	Black-hooded thrush	Turdus olivater	Venezuela and Colombia
	Great thrush	Turdus fuscater	Andes in western and northern Venezuela as far as Lara and Trujillo, the Andes of Colombia, Ecuador, Peru, and finally, northwest Bolivia
	Austral thrush	Turdus falcklandii	south Argentina and south and central Chile
	Lawrence's thrush	Turdus lawrencii	Bolivia, Brazil, Colombia, Ecuador, Peru, and Venezuela
	Pantepui thrush	Turdus murinus	foothills of south Venezuela and Guyana
	Blacksmith thrush	Turdus subalaris	north-east Argentina, eastern Paraguay and southern Brazil
	Creamy-bellied thrush	Turdus amaurochalinus	central and eastern South America
	Tristan thrush	Turdus eremita	British overseas territories of the isolated Tristan da Cunha archipelago
	Marañón thrush	Turdus maranonicus	southern Ecuador and northern Peru
	Black-billed thrush	Turdus ignobilis	western Amazonia and on the Guianan Shield, occurring in Bolivia, Brazil, Colombia, Ecuador, Peru, Venezuela, and Bolivia
	Campina thrush	Turdus arthuri	lowlands of south-eastern Venezuela, Guyana and Suriname, east Colombia and west-central Amazonian Brazil
	Yellow-legged thrush	Turdus flavipes	northern Colombia, Venezuela, far northern Brazil, Trinidad, and Tobago, as well as parts of the Pakaraima Mountains in western Guyana, eastern Brazil, eastern Paraguay, and far northeastern Argentina
	White-throated thrush	Turdus assimilis	Central America
	Dagua thrush	Turdus daguae	Panama to north-western Ecuador
	White-necked thrush	Turdus albicollis	eastern Brazil, far northern Uruguay, eastern Paraguay and far north-eastern Argentina
	Rufous-backed thrush	Turdus rufopalliatus	south-eastern Sonora to the south-eastern corner of Oaxaca along the coast and in the Río Balsas drainage, with isolated populations in Mexico City and Oaxaca City
A small brown bird with a greenish-looking underside on some branches.	Pale-vented thrush	Turdus obsoletus	Colombia, Costa Rica, Ecuador, Panama, and Peru
	Pale-breasted thrush	Turdus leucomelas	eastern and northern South America
	Cocoa thrush	Turdus fumigatus	South America
	Hauxwell's thrush	Turdus hauxwelli	Bolivia, Brazil, Colombia, Ecuador, Peru, and Venezuela
	Rufous-bellied thrush	Turdus rufiventris	southeast Brazil from Maranhão south to Rio Grande do Sul states, Bolivia, Paraguay, Uruguay and northern regions of Argentina
	Clay-colored thrush	Turdus grayi	South Texas (where it is rapidly expanding its range) to northern Colombia
	Spectacled thrush	Turdus nudigenis	South America from Colombia and Venezuela south and east to northern Brazil, and in Trinidad and Tobago
	Ecuadorian thrush	Turdus maculirostris	western Ecuador and far north-western Peru
A brown bird with a white underbelly and a yellow beak stands on a thick branch.	Várzea thrush	Turdus sanchezorum	western Amazon
	Unicolored thrush	Turdus haplochrous	Bolivia
