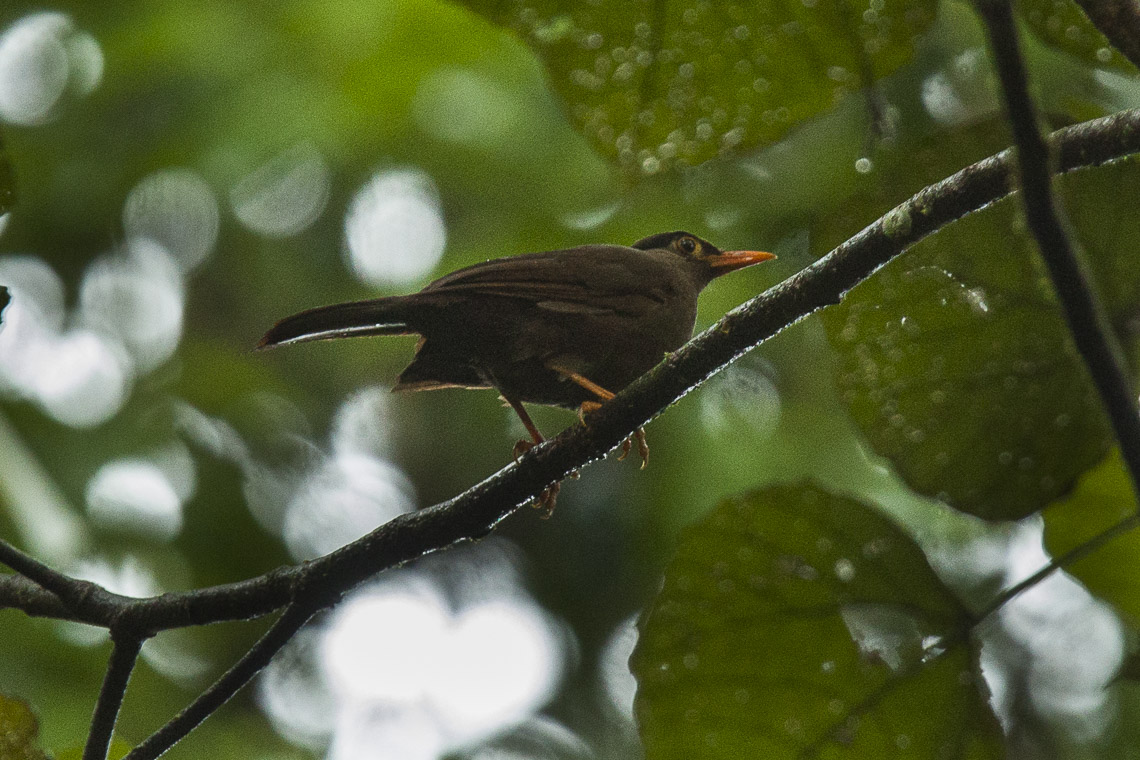

Conservation status
- Least Concern (IUCN 3.1)

Scientific classification
- Kingdom: Animalia
- Phylum: Chordata
- Class: Aves
- Order: Passeriformes
- Family: Turdidae
- Genus: Turdus
- Species: T. turdoides

Binomial name
- Turdus turdoides (Hartert, 1896)

Synonyms
- Cataponera turdoides Hartert, 1896

= Sulawesi thrush =

Species of bird

The Sulawesi thrush (Turdus turdoides) is a species of passerine bird in the thrush family, Turdidae. It is endemic to the island of Sulawesi in Indonesia, where it inhabits evergreen montane forests at altitudes of 1,100–2,400 m (3,600–7,900 ft). Although it has a limited range and is not a common bird, the IUCN has assessed it as being a "least-concern species".

== Taxonomy ==
The Sulawesi thrush was formally described in 1896 by the German ornithologist Ernst Hartert based on specimens collected at 2,000 m (6,600 ft) altitude and above near Bantaeng in southern Sulawesi, Indonesia. Hartert introduced a new genus Cataponera and coined the binomial name Cataponera turdoides. The taxonomic placement of this species remained uncertain since its description, with some authorities classifying it with the laughingthrushes (family Leiothrichidae), while others classified with the true thrushes (family Turdidae). Since the 2000s, it was generally placed in the monotypic genus Cataponera within the Turdidae, on morphological grounds. However, prior to a 2022 study, it was not yet placed phylogenetically. The study found the Sulawesi thrush to actually represent a highly divergent member of the genus Turdus, belonging in a clade comprising primarily migratory Palearctic thrushes, but with no close relatives. The International Ornithological Congress has followed the results of this study.

== Description ==
The Sulawesi thrush is a medium-sized species with a long beak, short rounded wings and robust legs. The head and upper parts are a dark olive brown and the underparts are somewhat paler, sometimes with a gingery or reddish tinge to the under-tail coverts. There is a distinctive black supercilium above the eye.

== Distribution ==
The Sulawesi thrush is endemic to the island of Sulawesi in Indonesia. Its habitat is evergreen montane forest and moss-forest and its altitudinal range lies between 1,100 and 2,400 m (3,600 and 7,900 ft). Four subspecies are recognised; T. t. abditiva from the northern part of the island; T. t. tenebrosa from the southern part; T. t. turdoides from southwestern Sulawesi and T. t. heinrichi from the southeast. It is not present in the central part of the island.

== Ecology ==
The Sulawesi thrush is a shy bird that is seldom seen and has been little studied. The diet consists of fruits and invertebrates and it forages in the middle and lower storeys of the canopy in evergreen montane forests, and on the ground beneath the trees. In behaviour and appearance it resembles thrushes in the genus Turdus, but it has other behaviours which are similar to those of the Old World babblers (Timaliidae), and the laughing thrushes (Garrulax).

== Status ==
The Sulawesi thrush has a somewhat restricted range and is a generally uncommon bird. The population is thought to be declining slowly but not at such a rate as to make it vulnerable, and the International Union for Conservation of Nature has assessed its conservation status as being of "least concern".
