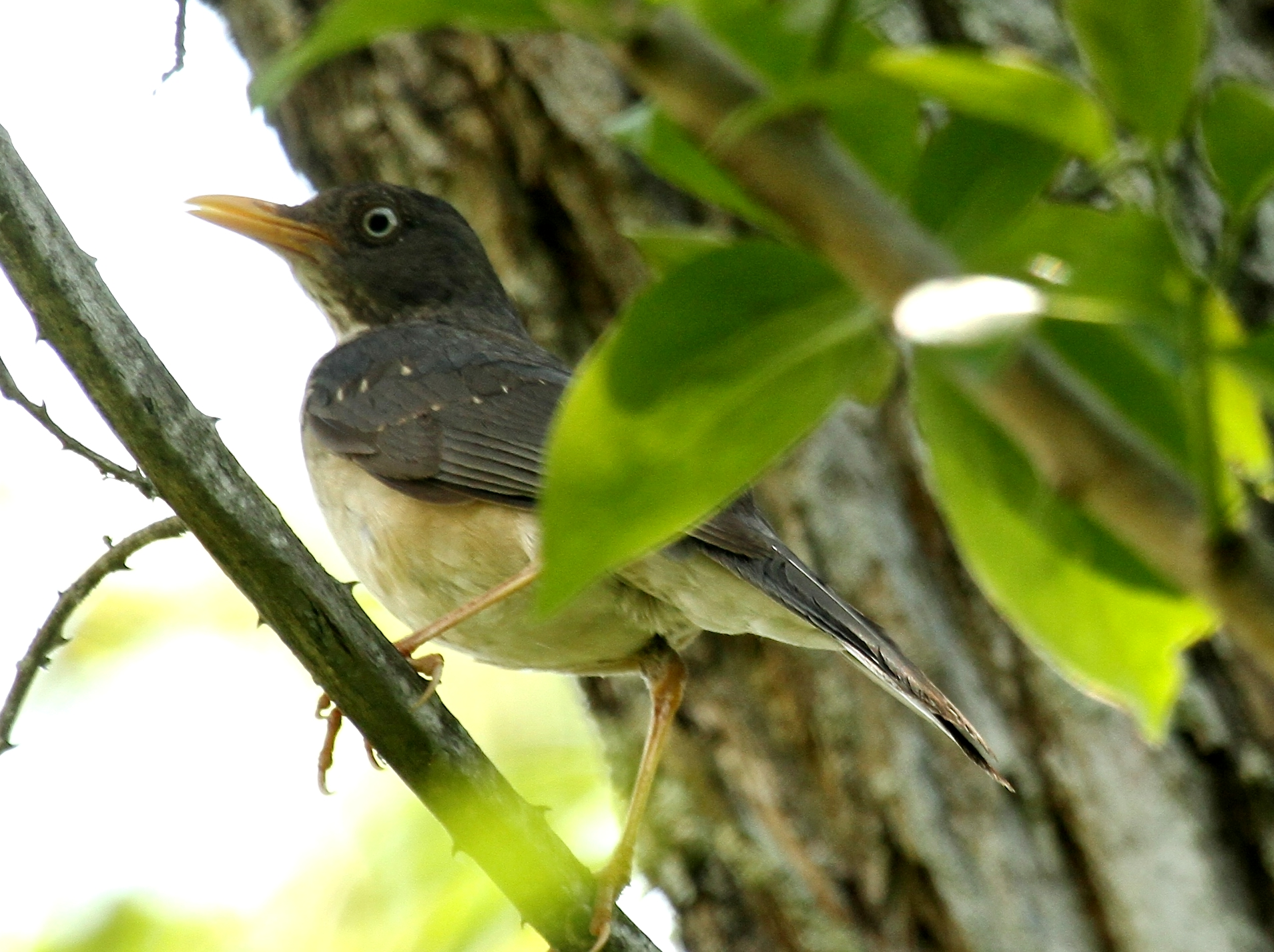

Conservation status
- Least Concern (IUCN 3.1)

Scientific classification
- Kingdom: Animalia
- Phylum: Chordata
- Class: Aves
- Order: Passeriformes
- Family: Turdidae
- Genus: Turdus
- Species: T. reevei

Binomial name
- Turdus reevei Lawrence, 1869

= Plumbeous-backed thrush =

Species of bird

The plumbeous-backed thrush (Turdus reevei) is a species of bird in the family Turdidae. It is found in Ecuador and Peru.

== Taxonomy and systematics ==
The plumbeous-backed thrush was originally described by George Newbold Lawrence in 1869 with its current binomial Turdus reevei. Lawrence chose the specific epithet reevei to honor J. F. Reeve, who collected the species' type specimen.

The plumbeous-backed thrush is monotypic.

== Description ==
The plumbeous-backed thrush is 23 to 24 cm (9.1 to 9.4 in) long and weighs 61 to 66 g (2.2 to 2.3 oz). The sexes have almost the same plumage. Adult males have a mostly bluish slate-gray head with a dark-streaked white throat. Female's heads are slightly browner. Both sexes have bluish slate-gray upperparts, wings, and tail. They have a white crescent below the streaked throat, a pale gray breast that becomes white on the belly and vent, and an orange-buff wash on the flanks. Both sexes have a white to bluish white iris, a pale yellow bill, and pale yellow legs and feet. Juveniles are similar to adults but browner with buff spots and streaks on the upperparts and dark scallops in the underparts.

== Distribution and habitat ==
The plumbeous-backed thrush is found from central Manabí and northern Los Rios provinces in western Ecuador south into Peru to eastern Lambayeque and western Cajamarca departments. It inhabits the interior, edges, and clearings of deciduous forest, somewhat humid evergreen forest, deciduous and evergreen woodlands, and scrublands. In Peru it apparently favors areas along rivers. In Ecuador it occurs mostly below 1,600 m (5,200 ft) and in Peru occurs up to 1,500 m (4,900 ft).

== Behavior ==
=== Movement ===
The plumbeous-backed thrush is believed to make seasonal movements that include occupying drier areas only during the rainy season.

=== Feeding ===
The plumbeous-backed thrush's diet has not been studied but is known to include fruits. It forages mostly in trees and often gathers in single-species flocks in fruiting ones. It also sometimes joins mixed-species feeding flocks.

=== Breeding ===
The plumbeous-backed thrush breeds during the rainy season of January to April. It builds a cup nest, shallow but with thick walls, using sticks, vines, and leaves held together with dung from domestic animals. Many nests have been found in dense foliage near the trunk in spiny trees, typically about 3 to 5 m (10 to 15 ft) above the ground. The usual clutch size has not been determined. The eggs are blue with brown spots. The incubation period is nine to 14 days and fledging occurs nine to 14 days after hatch. Details of parental care are not known.

=== Vocalization ===
The plumbeous-backed thrush appears to sing only during the breeding season. Its song is "a fairly fast, typical Turdus caroling". Its most common call is "an abrupt and piercing, descending pseeeu". Other calls include "a ringing tseeet" and "a wheezy, rising rheet".

== Status ==
The IUCN has assessed the plumbeous-backed thrush as being of Least Concern. Its population size is not known and is believed to be decreasing. No immediate threats have been identified. It is found only locally in Ecuador and is considered fairly common in Peru.
