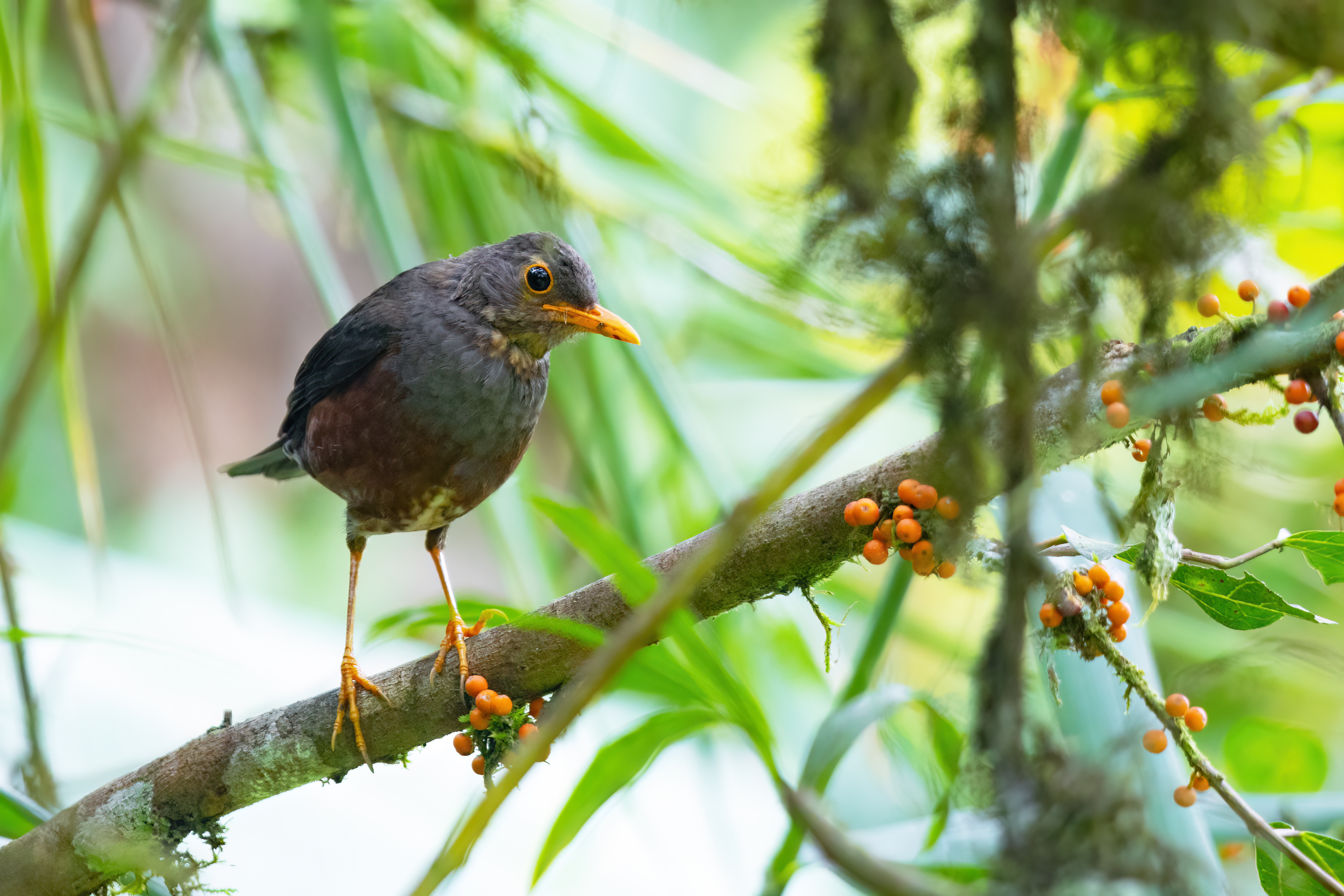

Scientific classification
- Kingdom: Animalia
- Phylum: Chordata
- Class: Aves
- Order: Passeriformes
- Family: Turdidae
- Genus: Turdus
- Species: T. ruficeps

Binomial name
- Turdus ruficeps (Ramsay, 1875)

= Fiji island thrush =

Species of bird

Fiji island thrush (Turdus ruficeps) is a species of passerine in the thrush family Turdidae that is endemic to Fiji. It was formerly considered a subspecies of island thrush, but in 2024 the island thrush was split into 17 separate species by the IOC and Clements Checklist based on morphological and phylogenetics differences.

== Taxonomy ==
The Fiji island thrush was formally described in 1875 by the Australian zoologist Edward Pierson Ramsay in The Sydney Morning Herald under the binomial name Merula ruficeps. The following year Ramsay republished his description in the Proceedings of the Linnean Society of New South Wales. The type locality is the Fijian island of Kadavu. The specific epithet combines the Latin rufus meaning "red" with -ceps meaning "headed". The Fiji island thrush with its subspecies were formerly considered to be part of the island thrush complex. Based on morphological differences and a molecular phylogenetic study published in 2023, the island thrush was split into 17 species.

Five subspecies are recognised:

- Turdus ruficeps ruficeps (Ramsay, 1875) - Found on Kadavu Island
- Turdus ruficeps layardi (Seebohm, 1891) - Found on Viti Levu, Ovalau, Yasawa, and Koro
- Turdus ruficeps vitiensis (Layard, 1876) - Found on Vanua Levu
- Turdus ruficeps hades Mayr, 1941 - Found on Gau
- Turdus ruficeps tempesti Layard, 1876 - Found of Taveuni
