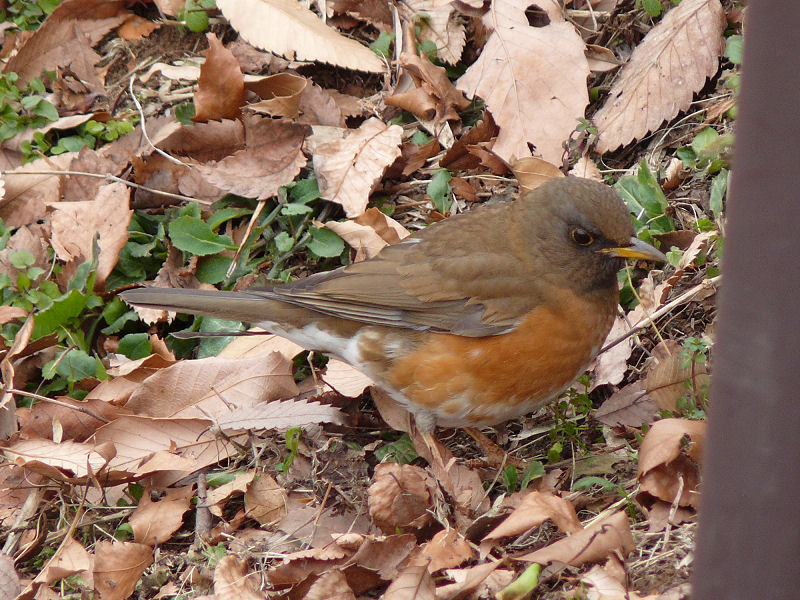

Conservation status
- Least Concern (IUCN 3.1)

Scientific classification
- Kingdom: Animalia
- Phylum: Chordata
- Class: Aves
- Order: Passeriformes
- Family: Turdidae
- Genus: Turdus
- Species: T. chrysolaus

Binomial name
- Turdus chrysolaus Temminck, 1832

= Brown-headed thrush =

Species of bird

The brown-headed thrush (Turdus chrysolaus), sometimes known as the brown thrush, is a species of bird in the family Turdidae. It breeds in Sakhalin, the Kuril Islands and Japan; it winters in south toward the Ryukyu Islands, Taiwan, Hainan and the northern Philippines. Its natural habitat is temperate forests.
