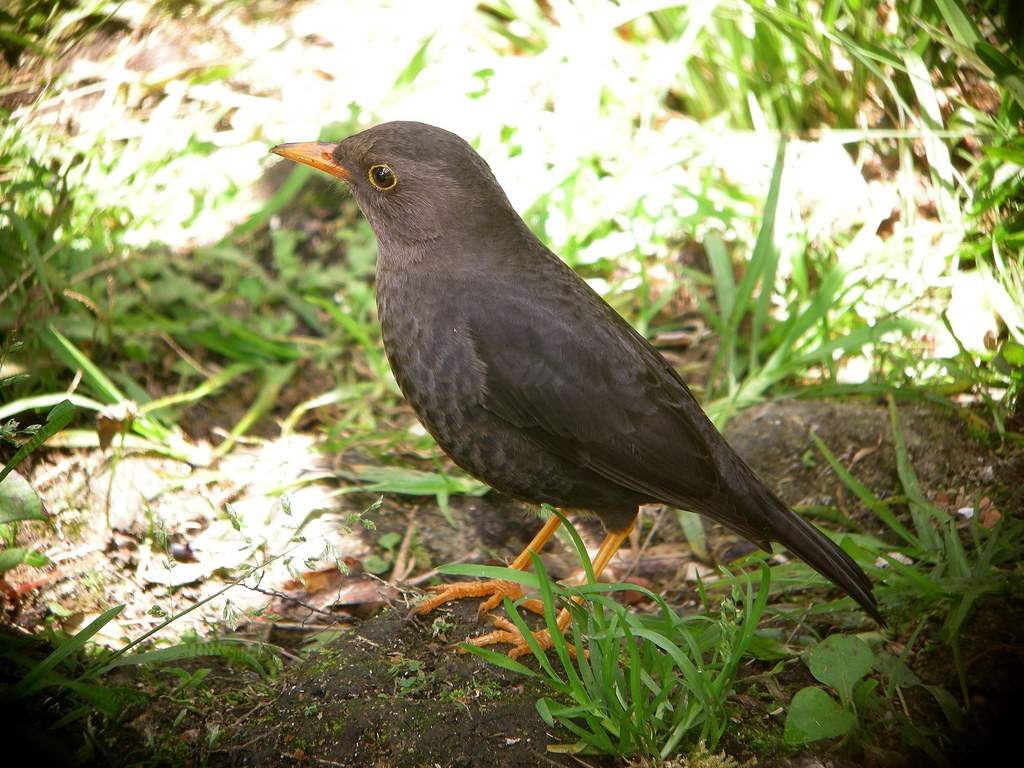
- Adult male of the subspecies Turdus papuensis erebus

Scientific classification
- Kingdom: Animalia
- Phylum: Chordata
- Class: Aves
- Order: Passeriformes
- Family: Turdidae
- Genus: Turdus
- Species: T. papuensis

Binomial name
- Turdus papuensis (De Vis, 1890)

= Papuan island thrush =

Species of bird

The Papuan island thrush (Turdus papuensis) is a species of passerine in the family Turdidae. It is endemic to New Guinea and Goodenough Island in the countries of Papua New Guinea and Indonesia. It was formerly considered to be a number of subspecies of the island thrush until 2024 when it was classified as a distinct species by the IOC and Clements checklist.

== Taxonomy ==
The Papuan island thrush was first described by ornithologist Charles Walter De Vis in 1890 as Merula papuensis based on specimens collected from Mount Victoria in Papua New Guinea. It was considered to be a number of subspecies of Island thrush until 2024 when it was one of 17 species that were split due to phylogenic evidence from a study in 2023.

Three subspecies are recognized:

- Turdus papuensis papuensis (De Vis, 1890) - Found in the mountains of southeast New Guinea (includes erebus and keysseri)
- Turdus papuensis versteegi Junge, 1939 - Found in the Jayawijaya Mountains
- Turdus papuensis canescens (De Vis, 1894) - Found on Goodenough Island
