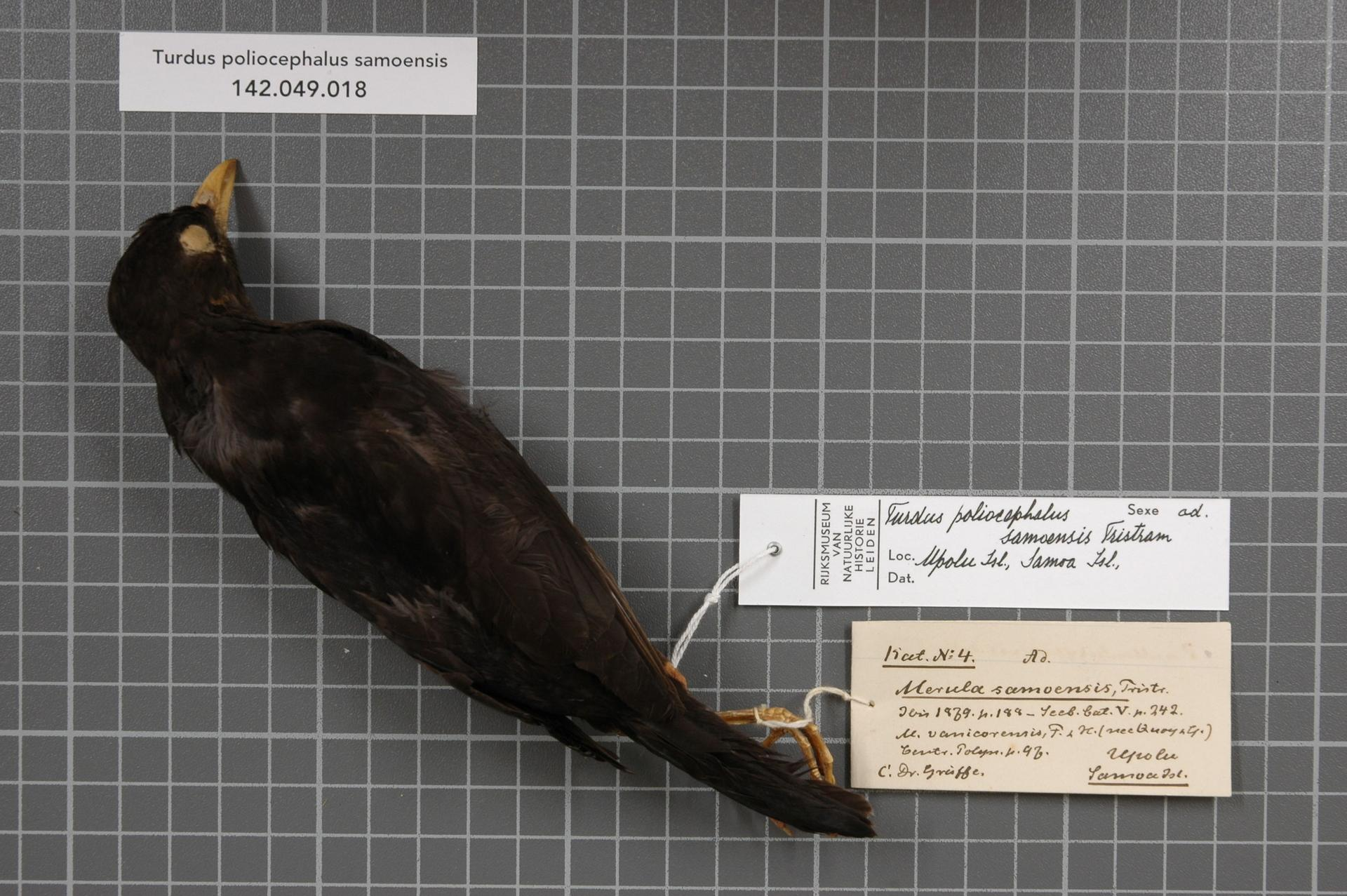

Scientific classification
- Kingdom: Animalia
- Phylum: Chordata
- Class: Aves
- Order: Passeriformes
- Family: Turdidae
- Genus: Turdus
- Species: T. samoensis

Binomial name
- Turdus samoensis Tristram, 1879

= Samoan island thrush =

Species of bird

The Samoan island thrush (Turdus samoensis) is a species of oscine passerine bird belonging to the family Turdidae, the thrushes. This thrush is endemic to Samoa, formerly known as Western Samoa. This taxon was previously considered to be a subspecies of the Island thrush (Turdus poliocephalus) sensu lato but this species has been split into a number of species.

== Taxonomy ==
The Samoan island thrush was first formally described by clergyman and zoological collector Henry Baker Tristram in 1879 as Turdus samoensis. For a long time afterwards it was considered a subspecies of island thrush. However following a phylogenetic study in 2023, and with consideration to morphological and genetic differences between subspecies, the Samoan island thrush is now treated as a distinct species. The species is monotypic: no subspecies are recognised.

== Etymology ==
The Samona island thrush is classified on the genus Turdus, Latin for thrush with the specific name samoensis, meaning "of Samoa". The Samoan language name for this bird is tutumalili.

== Description ==
The Samoan island thrush is an all dark thrush with a yellow eyering, bill legs and feet. It has various calls including a harsh chucking call, often delivered in bursts.

== Distribution and habitat ==
The Samoan island thrush is endemic to Samoa where it occurs on the islands of Savai'i and Upolu. It is found in high elevation forests, foraging at all forest levels, including on the forest floor. A survey carried out in 2012 found that these birds are found at altitudes greater than 1,300 m (4,300 ft) above sea level.
