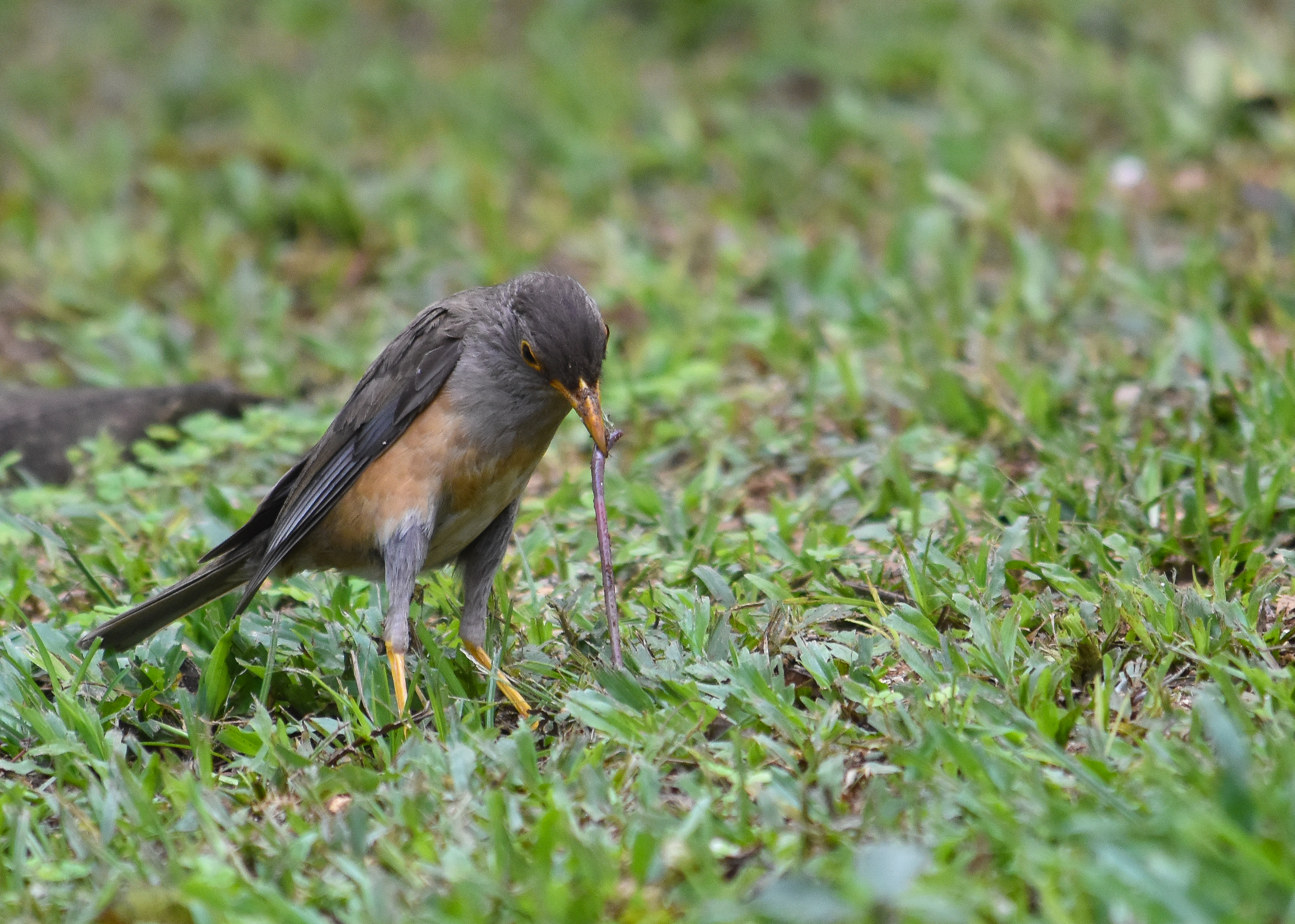
- Specimen eating an earthworm

Conservation status
- Endangered (EPBC Act)

Scientific classification
- Kingdom: Animalia
- Phylum: Chordata
- Class: Aves
- Order: Passeriformes
- Family: Turdidae
- Genus: Turdus
- Species: T. erythropleurus

Binomial name
- Turdus erythropleurus Sharpe, 1887

= Christmas island thrush =

Species of bird

The Christmas island thrush (Turdus erythropleurus) is a species of passerine in the family Turdidae. It is endemic to Christmas Island, an Australian territory in the Indian Ocean. It was formerly considered a subspecies of island thrush, but was classified as its own species in 2024 by the IOC and Clements checklist.

== Description ==
The Christmas island thrush has a mainly dark grey-brown head, paler grey-brown throat and upper breast, with olive-brown upperparts. The flanks, lower breast and sides of belly are orange, with a white belly and vent. It is about 21 cm in length, with a wingspan of 34 cm and a weight of 55 g. Its bill, orbital ring and legs are yellow-orange. Males and females are similar in size and appearance.

== Distribution and habitat ==
The species is now limited to Christmas Island. Between 1885 and 1900 it was introduced to the Cocos (Keeling) Islands, where it was plentiful for many years on three islands of the main atoll as well as on North Keeling. However, between the 1940s and 1980s population reduced until becoming extirpated. It is commonly found in most habitats on Christmas Island, including rainforest and gardens. It is less common in Pandanus thickets, dense regrowth and post-mining wasteland.

== Behaviour ==
=== Breeding ===
The thrush breeds mainly from early October until the middle of March, though there are records from other months. It nests in trees and tree ferns, and sometimes on the ledges of buildings. The clutch size is usually 2–3, and the incubation period is 18 days, with fledging in 17–19 days. Several broods may be raised in a season.

=== Feeding ===
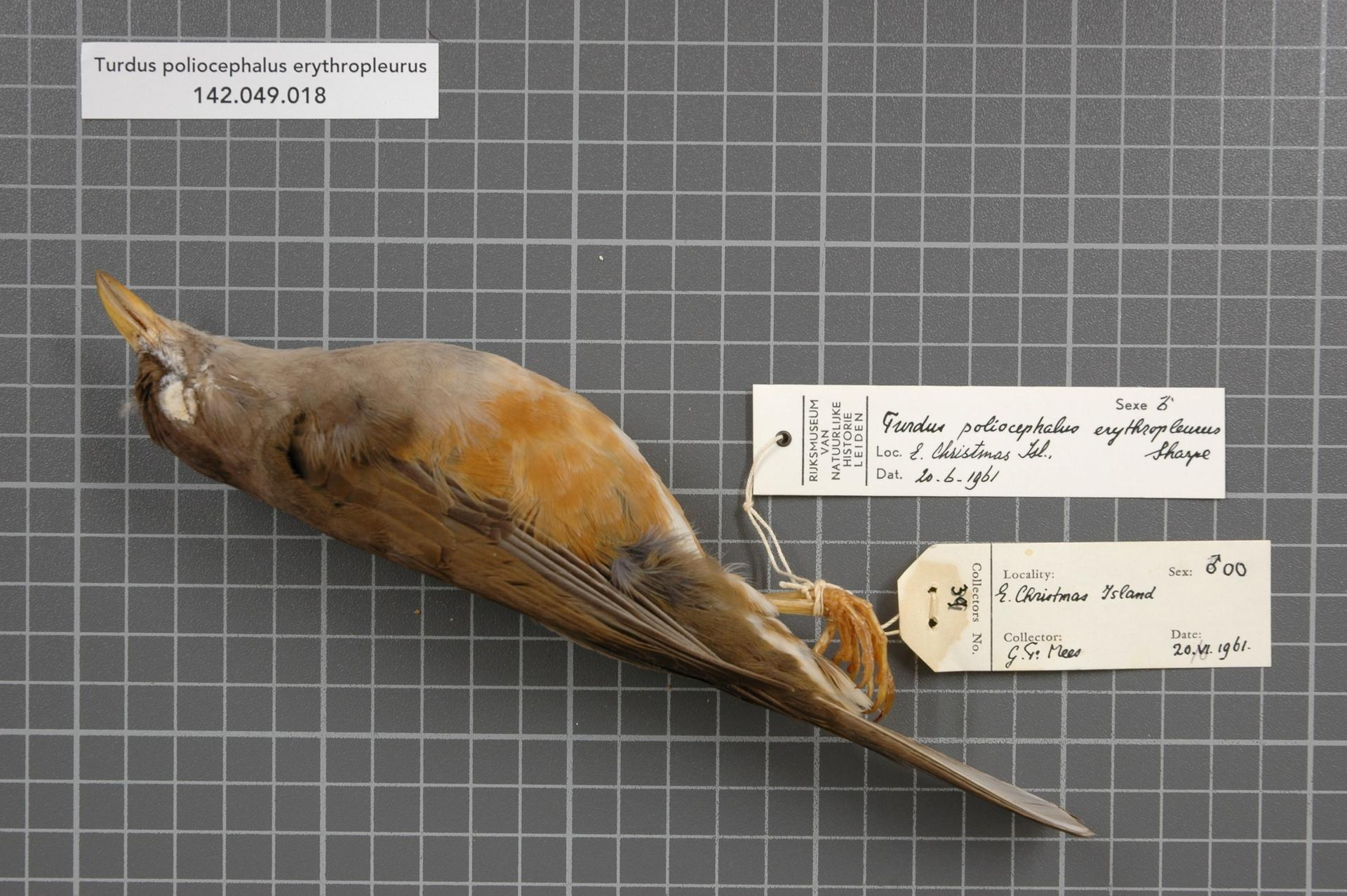
Museum bird skin specimen

It forages mainly on the ground, in leaf litter in the forest and forest clearings, as well as on lawns, for small invertebrates, including insects, snails and earthworms, seeds and fallen fruit.

== Status and conservation ==
In 2000 the population of the Christmas island thrush was estimated to comprise some 4000 birds. However, some estimates go as high as 15,000 individual birds. The main threat to the species, as well as to other Christmas Island endemic birds, is predation of its nestlings by introduced yellow crazy ants. It was listed by the Australian Government as being critically endangered, now endangered.
