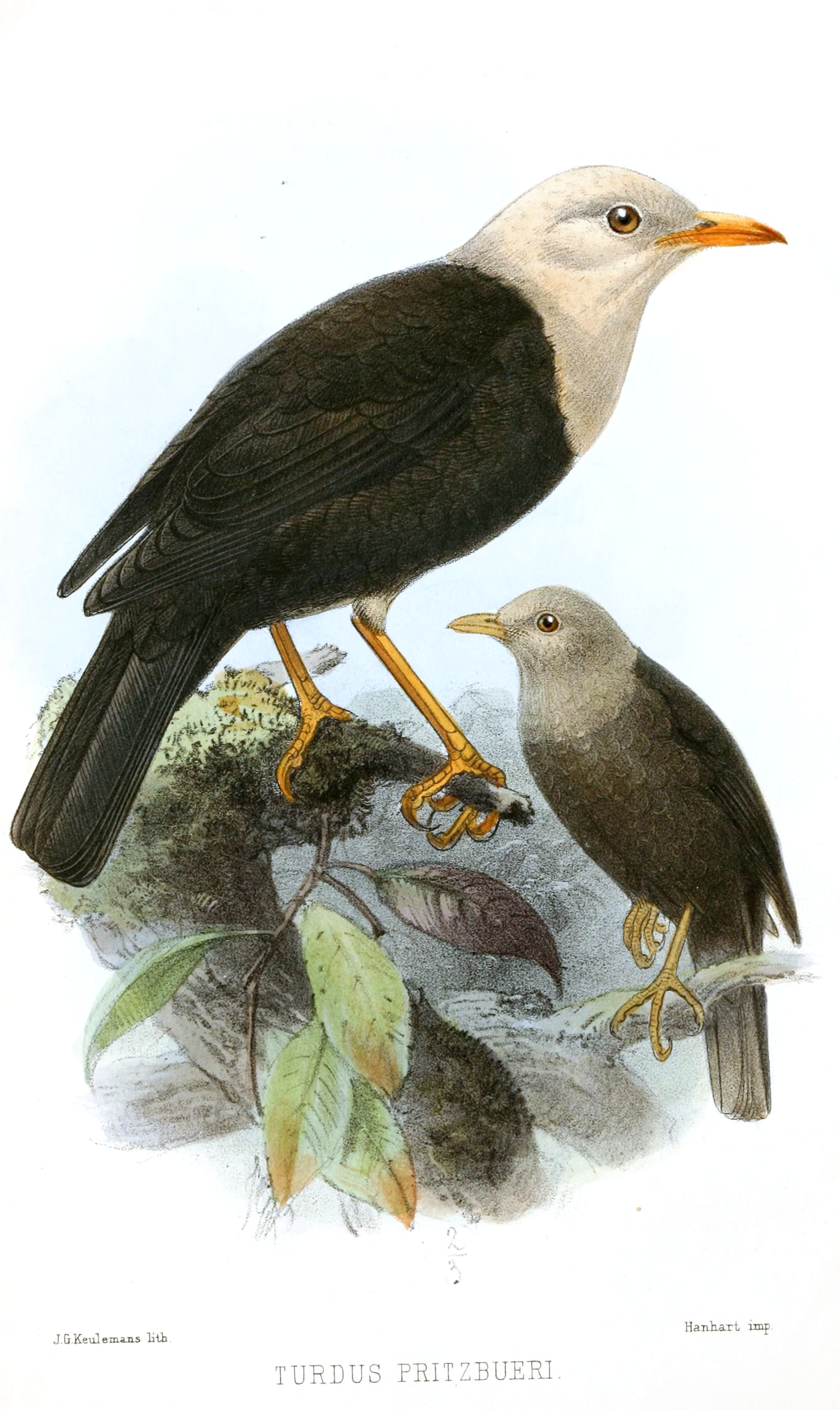
- Male (left), female (right)

Scientific classification
- Kingdom: Animalia
- Phylum: Chordata
- Class: Aves
- Order: Passeriformes
- Family: Turdidae
- Genus: Turdus
- Species: T. pritzbueri

Binomial name
- Turdus pritzbueri Layard, 1878

= White-headed island thrush =

Species of bird

The white-headed island-thrush (Turdus pritzbueri), also known as the Loyalty island thrush, is a species of passerine in the family Turdidae. It is found in Vanuatu, and New Caledonia. It was formerly considered to be a subspecies of island thrush, but was classified as a distinct species by the IOC and Clements checklist in 2024.

== Taxonomy ==
The white-headed island thrush was first described as Turdus pritzbueri in 1878 by ornithologist Edgar Leopold Layard based on a specimen from Lifou Island. It was later considered to be a subspecies of Island thrush under the name T. p. pritzbueri. Following a 2023 phylogenic study, it was one of 17 species split from the Island thrush in 2024.

There are currently two recognized subspecies:

- Turdus pritzbueri pritzbueri Layard, 1878 - Found on the islands of Tanna and Futuna in Vanuatu and the Loyalty Islands in New Caledonia
- Turdus pritzbueri albifrons (Ramsay, 1879) - Found on Erromango in Vanuatu
