= Bougainville island thrush =

Scientific classification
- Kingdom: Animalia
- Phylum: Chordata
- Class: Aves
- Order: Passeriformes
- Family: Turdidae
- Genus: Turdus
- Species: T. bougainvillei

Binomial name
- Turdus bougainvillei Mayr, 1941

Species of bird

The Bougainville island thrush (Turdus bougainvillei) is a species of passerine in the family Turdidae. It is endemic to Bougainville Island in Papua New Guinea. It was formerly considered a subspecies of the island thrush, but was split by the IOC and Clements checklist in 2024.

== Taxonomy ==
The Bougainville island thrush was first described as a subspecies of Island thrush in 1941 by ornithologist Ernst Mayer. Following a 2023 phylogenic study, the island thrush was split into 17 species, including the Bougainville island thrush.
