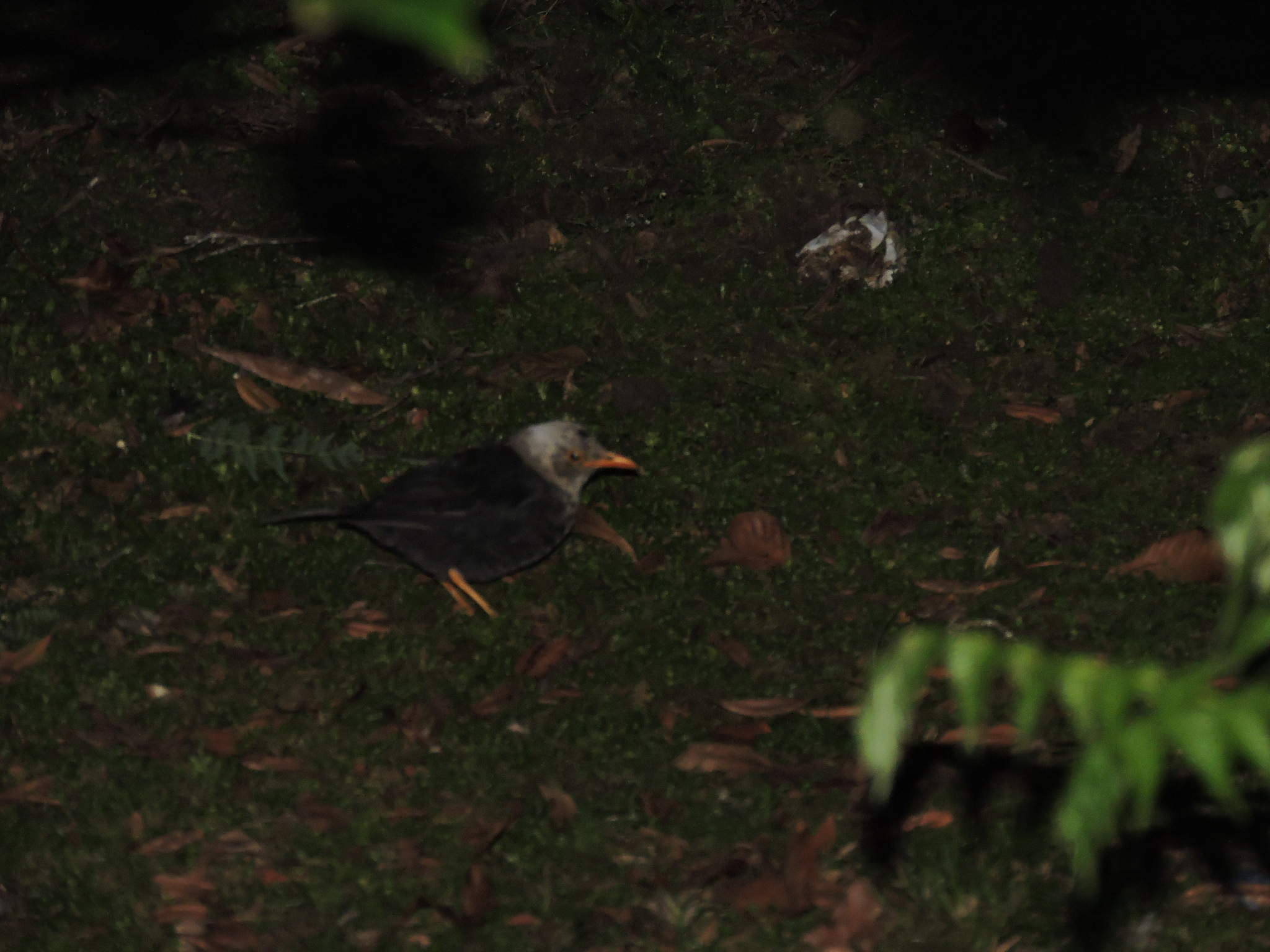
- Turdus deningeri deningeri

Scientific classification
- Kingdom: Animalia
- Phylum: Chordata
- Class: Aves
- Order: Passeriformes
- Family: Turdidae
- Genus: Turdus
- Species: T. deningeri

Binomial name
- Turdus deningeri Stresemann, 1912

= Moluccan island thrush =

Species of bird

The Moluccan island thrush (Turdus deningeri), also known as the Sula island thrush, is a species of passerine bird in the thrush family Turdidae. It is endemic to Indonesia. Prior to 2024 it was considered to be two separate subspecies of the island thrush.

== Taxonomy ==
The Moluccan island thrush was formally described in 1912 by the German ornithologist Erwin Stresemann based on specimens collected at an altitude of between 2,100 and 2,500 metres (7,000 and 8,300 ft) on the central mountains of the island of Seram in the Maluku Islands of Indonesia. He coined the binomial name Turdus deningeri where the specific epithet was chosen to honour the German zoologist and expedition leader Karl Deninger (1878-1917). Following a 2023 study of the phylogenetics of the island thrush subspecies, the island thrush was split into 17 different species by the IOC and Clements checklist.

Two subspecies are recognised:

- Turdus deningeri deningeri Stresemann, 1912 – found on Seram Island
- Turdus deningeri sukhujan Rheindt, Prawiradilaga, Ashari & Suparno, 2020 – found on Taliabu Island
