= Solomons island thrush =

Scientific classification
- Kingdom: Animalia
- Phylum: Chordata
- Class: Aves
- Order: Passeriformes
- Family: Turdidae
- Genus: Turdus
- Species: T. kulambangrae

Binomial name
- Turdus kulambangrae Mayr, 1941

Species of bird

The Solomons island thrush (Turdus kulambangrae), also known as the Guadalcanal island thrush, is a species of passerine in the family Turdidae. It is endemic to the Solomon Islands. Prior to 2024, it was considered to be two different subspecies of the island thrush.

== Taxonomy ==
The Solomons island thrush was first described in 1941 by ornithologist Ernst Mayr as a subspecies of island thrush. However following a 2023 phylogenic study of the island thrush complex, the island thrush was split into 17 species by the IOC and Clements checklist.

There are currently two recognized subspecies:

- Turdus kulambangrae kulambangrae Mayr, 1941 – Found on Kolombangara
- Turdus kulambangrae sladeni Cain & Galbraith, 1955 – Found on Guadalcanal

== Description ==
Solomons island thrushes reach average lengths of 19–20.5 cm (7.5–8.1 in) and average weights of 57–67.5 g (2.01–2.38 oz). Adult males of the nominate race are completely blackish-brown, with yellowish rings of bare skin around their eyes and yellow bills and legs. Adult females and juveniles can sometimes have rust-colored markings below. The Guadalcanal subspecies sladeni is larger than kulambangrae and has a lighter-coloured underwing.

== Distribution and habitat ==
As the name suggests, the Solomons island thrush is endemic to the Solomon Islands, being found only on the islands of Kolombangara and Guadalcanal. Like other island thrushes, it is an inhabitant of montane forests and is particularly partial to dwarf cloud forests. It is found at elevations of more than 1,200 m (3,900 ft) above sea level on Guadalcanal and 1,500 m (4,900 ft) asl on Kolombangara.
