= Bismarck island thrush =

Scientific classification
- Kingdom: Animalia
- Phylum: Chordata
- Class: Aves
- Order: Passeriformes
- Family: Turdidae
- Genus: Turdus
- Species: T. heinrothi

Binomial name
- Turdus heinrothi Rothschild & Hartert, 1924

Species of bird

The Bismarck island thrush (Turdus heinrothi), is a species of passerine in the family Turdidae. It is endemic to islands in Papua New Guinea. It was formerly considered to be multiple subspecies of the island thrush, until 2024 when the island thrush was split into 17 species by the IOC and Clements checklist.

== Taxonomy ==
The Bismarck island thrush was first described in 1924 by ornithologists Lionel Walter Rothschild and Ernst Hartert. There are currently three recognized subspecies:

- Turdus heinrothi heinrothi Rothschild & Hartert, 1924 - Found on Mussau Island
- Turdus heinrothi tolokiwae Diamond, 1989 - Found on Tolokiwa Island
- Turdus heinrothi beehleri Ripley, 1977 - Found on New Ireland Island
