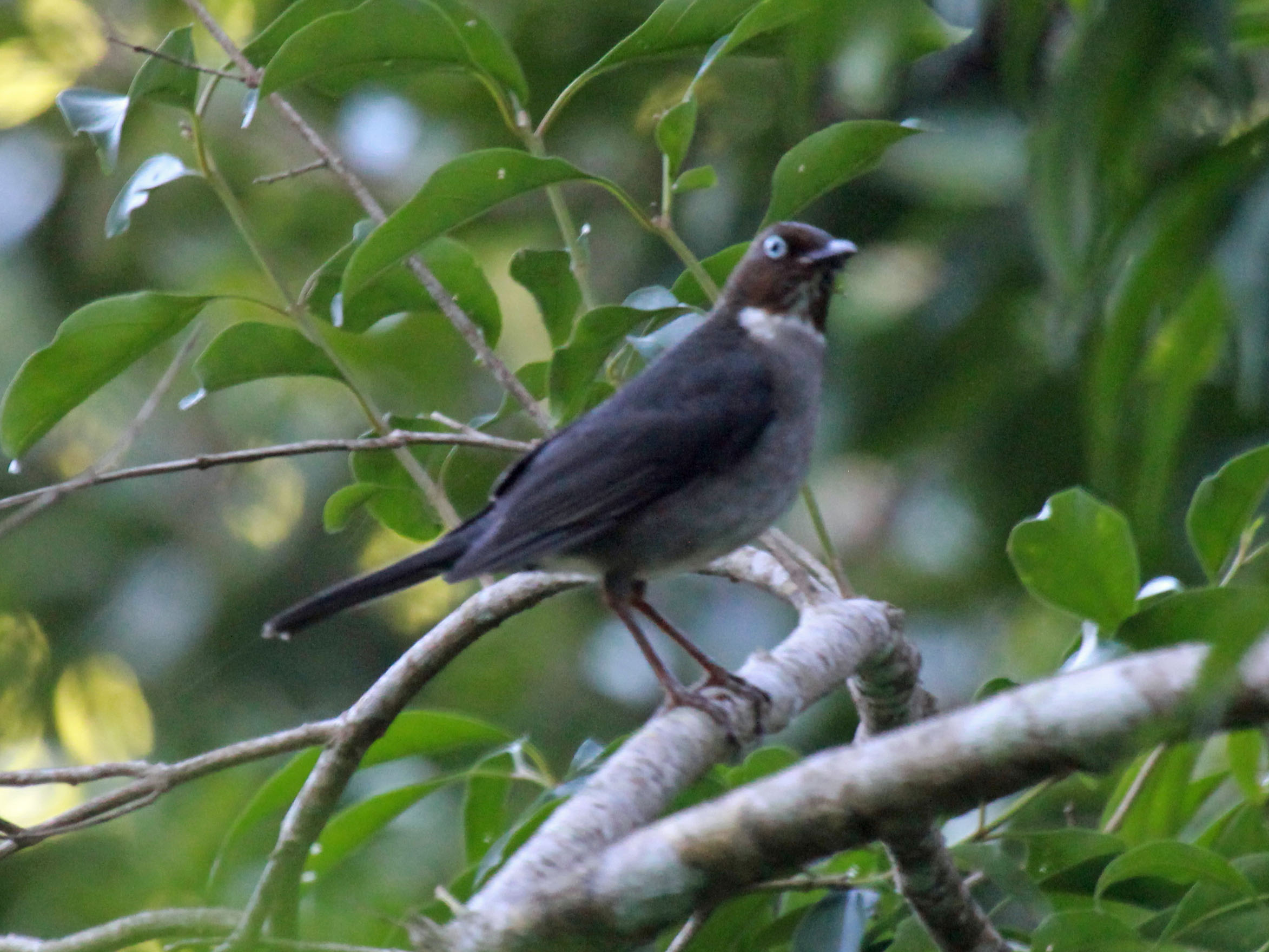

Conservation status
- Least Concern (IUCN 3.1)

Scientific classification
- Kingdom: Animalia
- Phylum: Chordata
- Class: Aves
- Order: Passeriformes
- Family: Turdidae
- Genus: Turdus
- Species: T. jamaicensis

Binomial name
- Turdus jamaicensis Gmelin, JF, 1789

= White-eyed thrush =

Species of bird

The white-eyed thrush (Turdus jamaicensis) is a species of bird in the family Turdidae that is endemic to Jamaica.

== Taxonomy and systematics ==
The white-eyed thrush was formally described in 1789 by the German naturalist Johann Friedrich Gmelin in his revised and expanded edition of Carl Linnaeus's Systema Naturae. He placed it with the thrushes in the genus Turdus and coined the binomial Turdus jamaicensis. Gmelin based his account on the "Jamaica thrush" that had been described in 1783 by the English ornithologist John Latham in his multi-volume work A General Synopsis of Birds. Latham had examined a specimen in the collection of the British Museum.

The species is monotypic: No subspecies are recognized.

== Description ==
The white-eyed thrush is 23 to 24 cm (9.1 to 9.4 in) long and weighs about 59 g (2.1 oz). The sexes have the same plumage. Adults have a mostly reddish brown head with a white eye-ring and a white chin and throat streaked with chestnut-brown. Their upperparts, wings, and tail are slate gray. Their underparts are mostly pale gray-brown with a white crescent between the throat and breast and a white vent area. They have a dark iris, a blackish bill, and blackish legs and feet. Juveniles are similar to adults but with heavy darker streaks on the breast.

== Distribution and habitat ==
The white-eyed thrush is found across most of Jamaica, shunning only the lowest areas. It inhabits wet forest in the foothills and mountains, other woodlands, and shade coffee plantations. In elevation it ranges from about 100 m (300 ft) up to the highest points on the island.

== Behavior ==
=== Movement ===
The white-eyed thrush is mostly a year-round resident though some individuals move from higher to lower elevations after the breeding season.

=== Feeding ===
The white-eyed thrush feeds on a variety of fruits, insects, and other invertebrates such as worms. It forages from the forest floor, where it searches leaf litter, to the canopy.

=== Breeding ===
The white-eyed thrush breeds between April and June. It builds a bulky cup nest in a tree using plant material. The clutch is two or three eggs that are bluish green with darker speckles. The incubation period, time to fledging, and details of parental care are not known.

=== Vocalization ===
The white-eyed thrush's song is a series of repeated musical phrases that often include a whistled hee-haw. It has been likened to that of a northern mockingbird (Mimus polyglottos), for which see here. However, the thrush's song is louder and less variable than the mockingbird's. The white-eyed thrush also makes harsh high-pitched call notes.

== Status ==
The IUCN has assessed the white-eyed thrush as being of Least Concern. It has a limited range; its population size is not known but is believed to be stable. No immediate threats have been identified. It is considered fairly common in the proper habitat. It is found in Blue and John Crow Mountains National Park.
