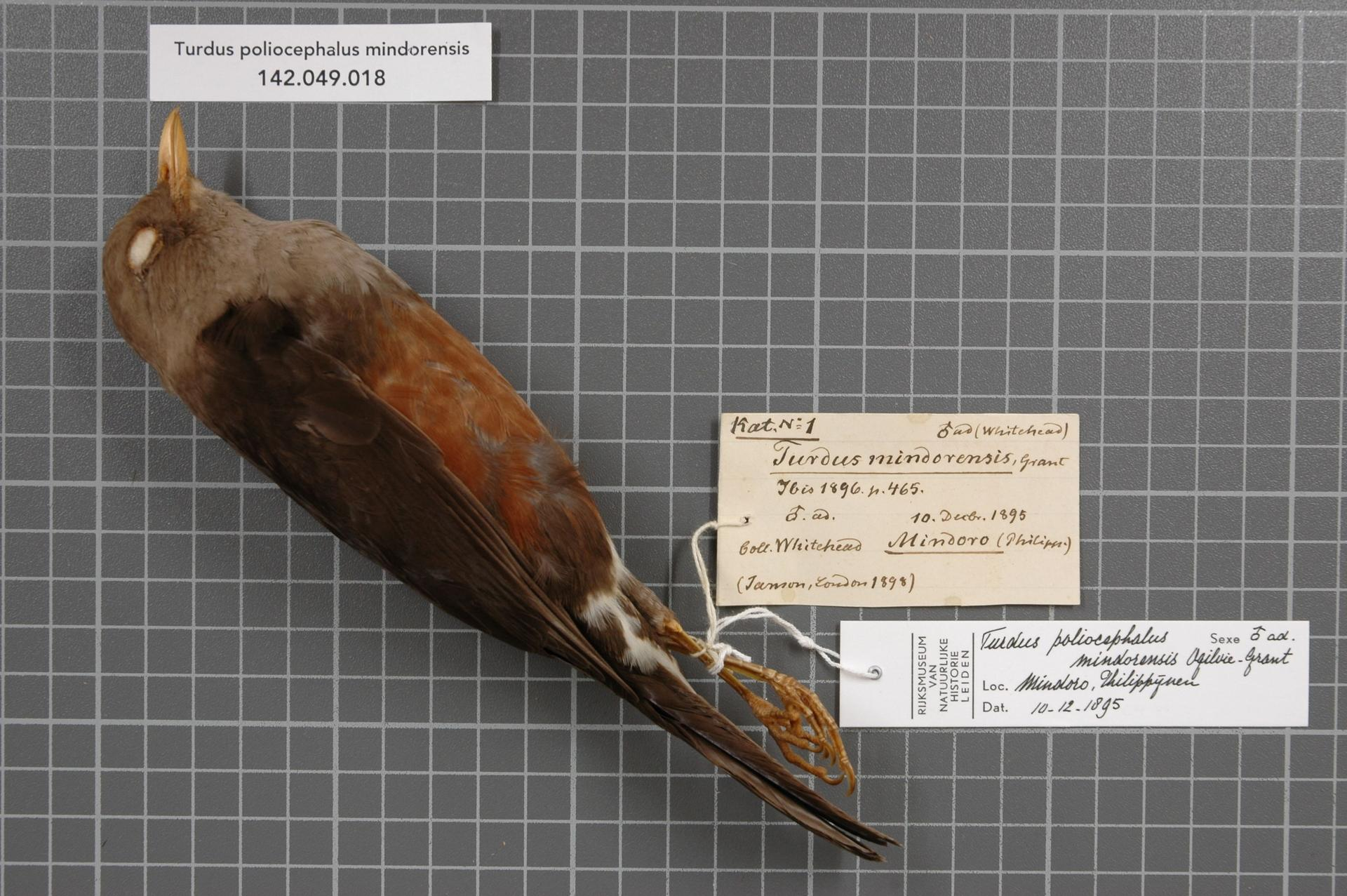

Scientific classification
- Kingdom: Animalia
- Phylum: Chordata
- Class: Aves
- Order: Passeriformes
- Family: Turdidae
- Genus: Turdus
- Species: T. mindorensis

Binomial name
- Turdus mindorensis Ogilvie-Grant, 1896

= Mindoro island thrush =

Species of bird

The Mindoro island thrush (Turdus mindorensis), is a species of passerine in the family Turdidae. It is endemic to Mindoro in the Philippines. Its habitat is tropical moist montane forest above 1,200 meters above sea level. Prior to 2024, it was considered a subspecies of Island thrush.

== Description and taxonomy ==
The Mindoro island thrush was first described by Scottish ornithologist William Robert Ogilvie-Grant in 1896. It was later considered to be a subspecies of Island thrush. Following a 2023 phylogenic study, the island thrush complex was split into 17 different species by the IOC and Clements checklist. Based on this, it was discovered that among all species, the Mindoro island thrush was the most genetically divergent.

This species is monotypic and has no subspecies.

== Ecology and behavior ==
This is a newly split species and there are no specific studies yet for the Mindoro island thrush and even among the Philippine island thrushes this is one of the least known with just one known photo. The Island thrush species complex has a varied and generalist diet taking a range of invertebrates such as insects including beetles, spiders, snails, earthworms, as well as carrion and even small reptiles. It will also take fruit and seeds, depending on what is locally available. It is observed foraging on leaf litter and low branches in dense cover, clearings and even roads.

Breeding season is believed to be April to May but birds with enlarged gonads have been collected from February to October. The island thrush species complex makes cup shaped nests of grass, roots, tendrils, twigs, bark and moss. These nests are typically placed low and close to a clearing. Clutch size is 1 to 3 eggs but is usually 2. Eggs are greenish blue with brown spots. Incubation takes 18 days and fledgling takes 17 to 19 days.

== Habitat and conservation status ==
It occurs in tropical moist montane forest and forest edges above altitudes of 1,200 m. It is mainly seen in Podocarpus forest.

This is a newly split species and has yet to be assessed by the International Union for Conservation of Nature. This bird is believed to be common in its habitat. However, like all other forest species in the Philippines, its population is still likely on the decline. Most of the other Mindoro endemic birds are listed as threatened but compared to its lowland counterparts, this montane specialist's mountain habitat has remained relatively intact. Despite this, encroachment from illegal logging, settlers and land conversion still occurs.

It occurs in a few protected areas like Mounts Iglit–Baco Natural Park and Mount Halcon however, actual protection from deforestation and hunting is lax.
