= List of thrush species =

Thrushes and allies form the passerine bird family Turdidae. In 2024, the International Ornithological Committee (IOC) accepted 193 species of thrushes, with one more added in 2025. Of these, 105 are in the genus Turdus and the rest are distributed among 15 other genera. This list includes five extinct species that are marked (X).

This list is presented according to the IOC taxonomic sequence and can also be sorted alphabetically by common name and binomial.

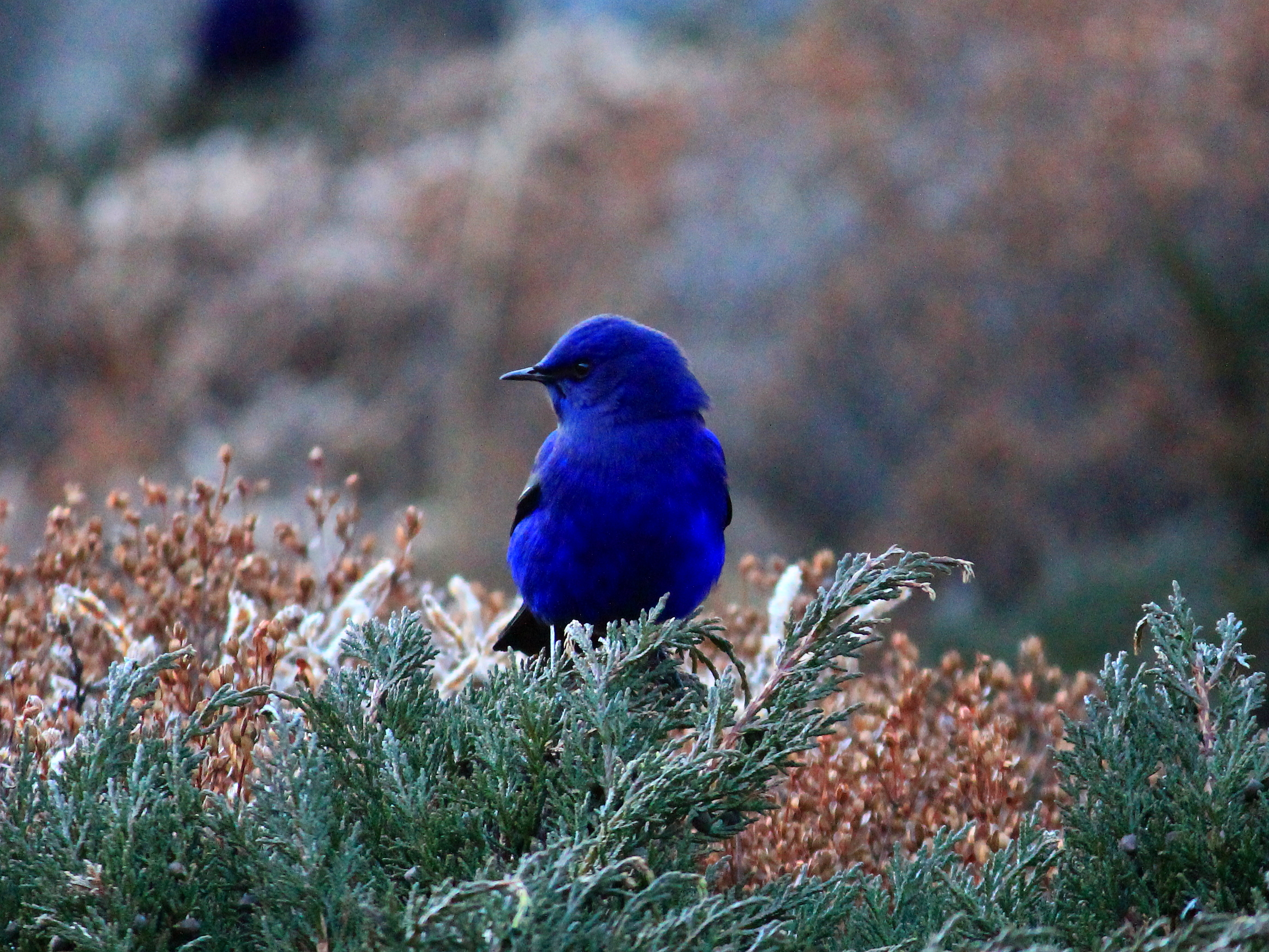
Grandala coelicolor

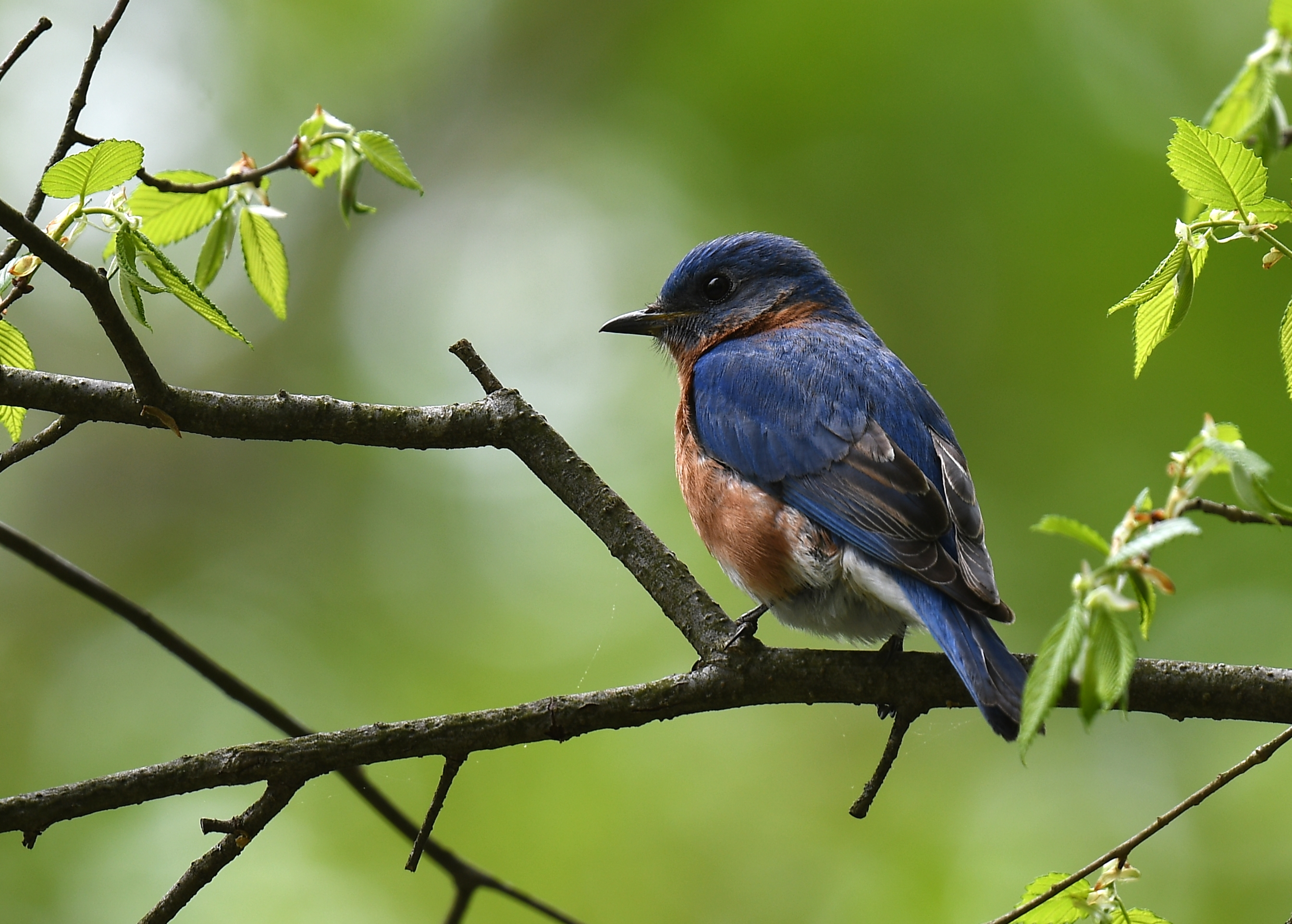
Sialia sialis

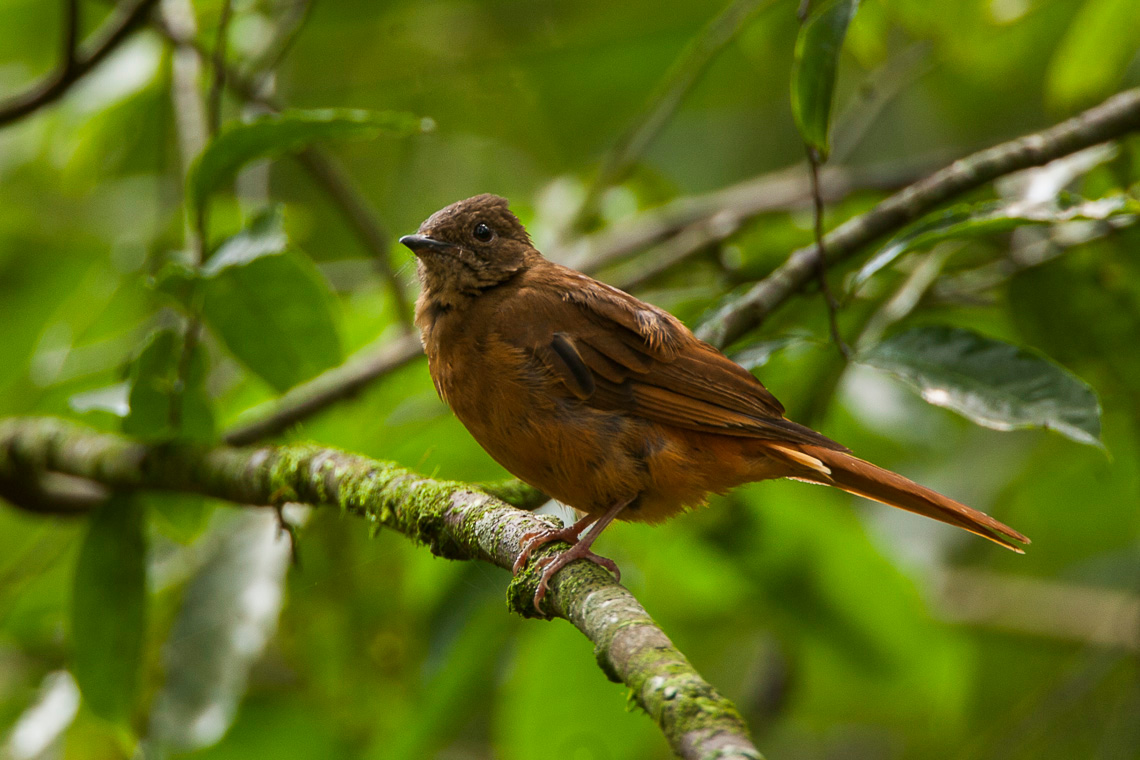
Stizorhina fraseri

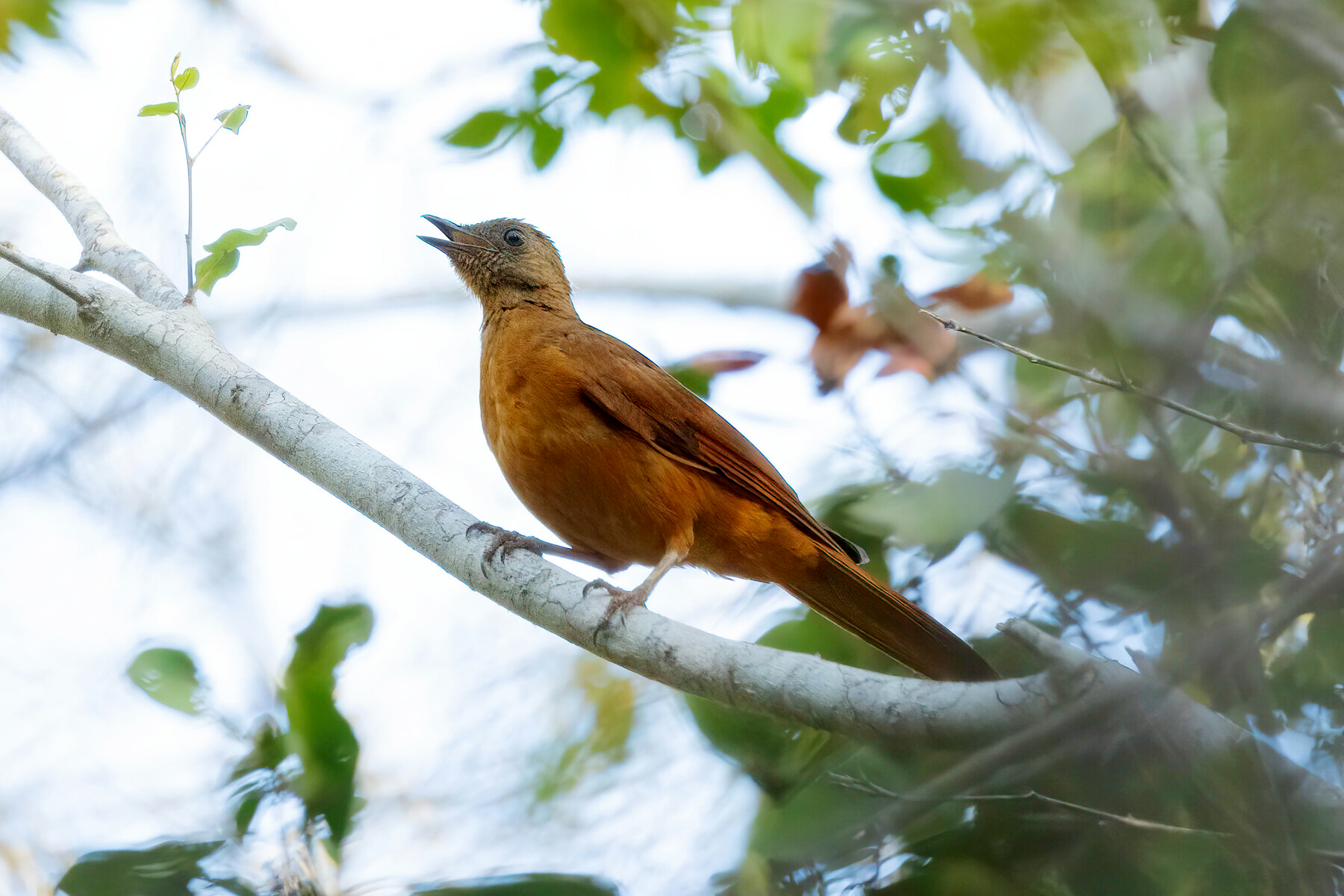
Neocossyphus rufus

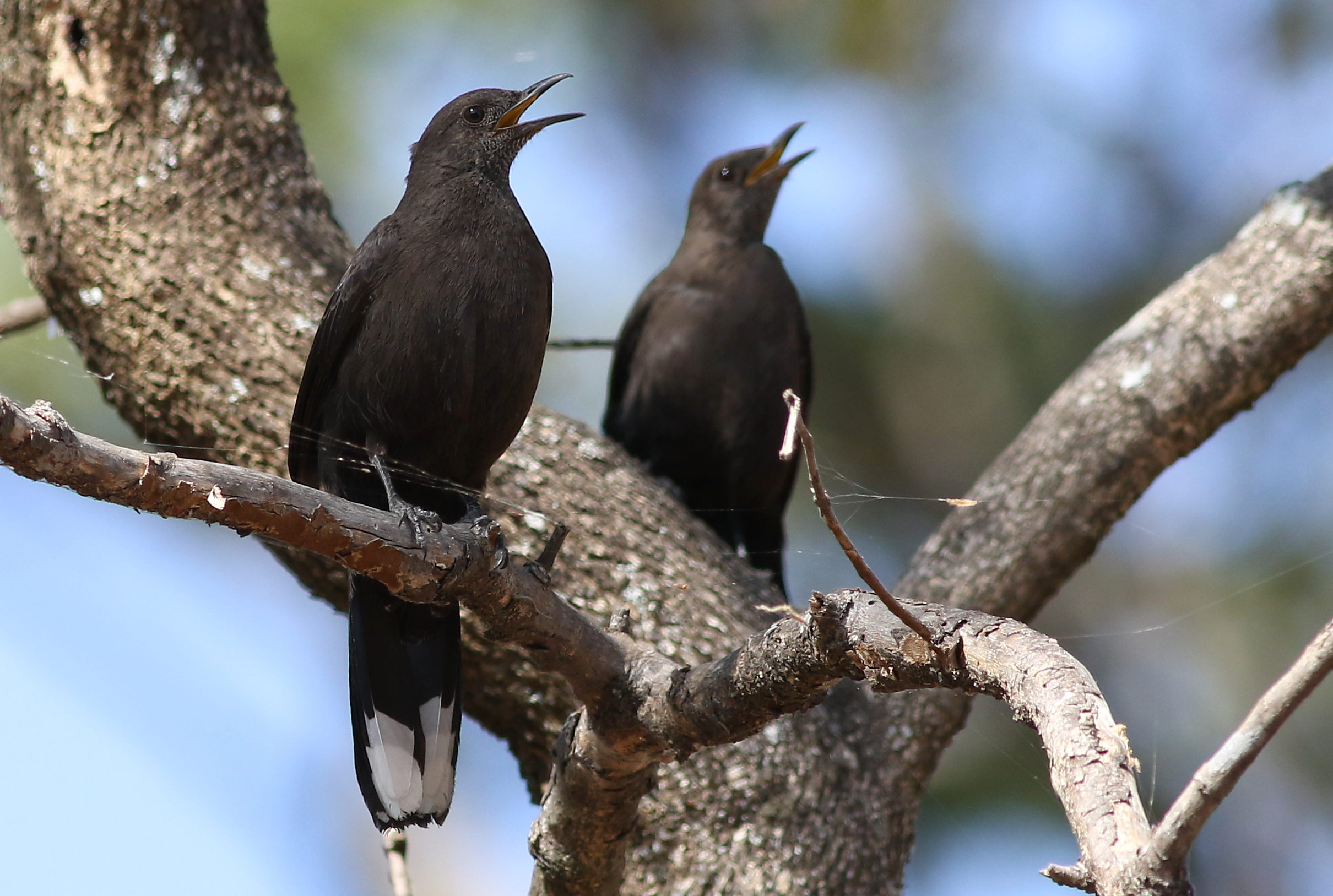
Pinarornis plumosus

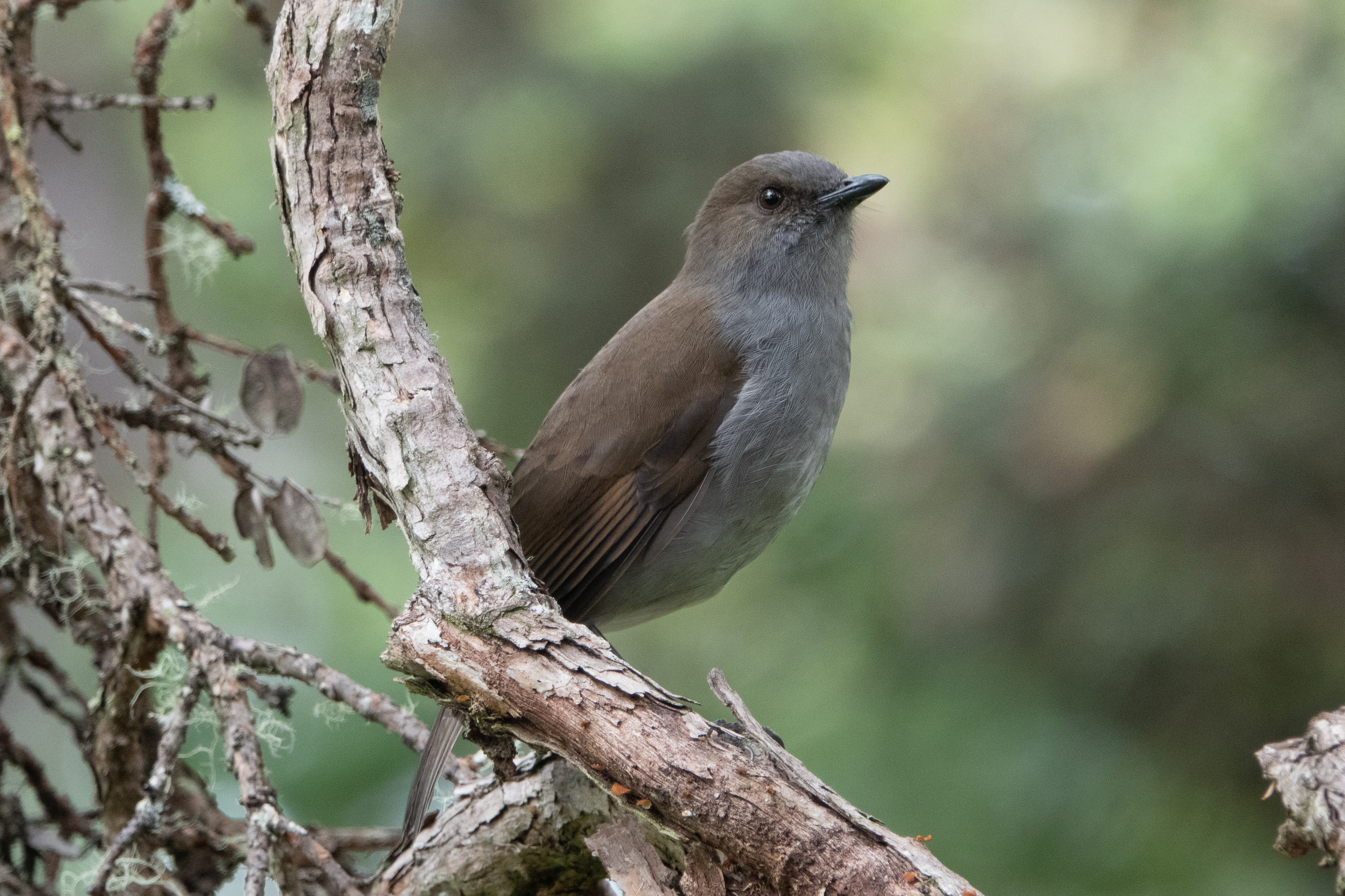
Myadestes obscurus

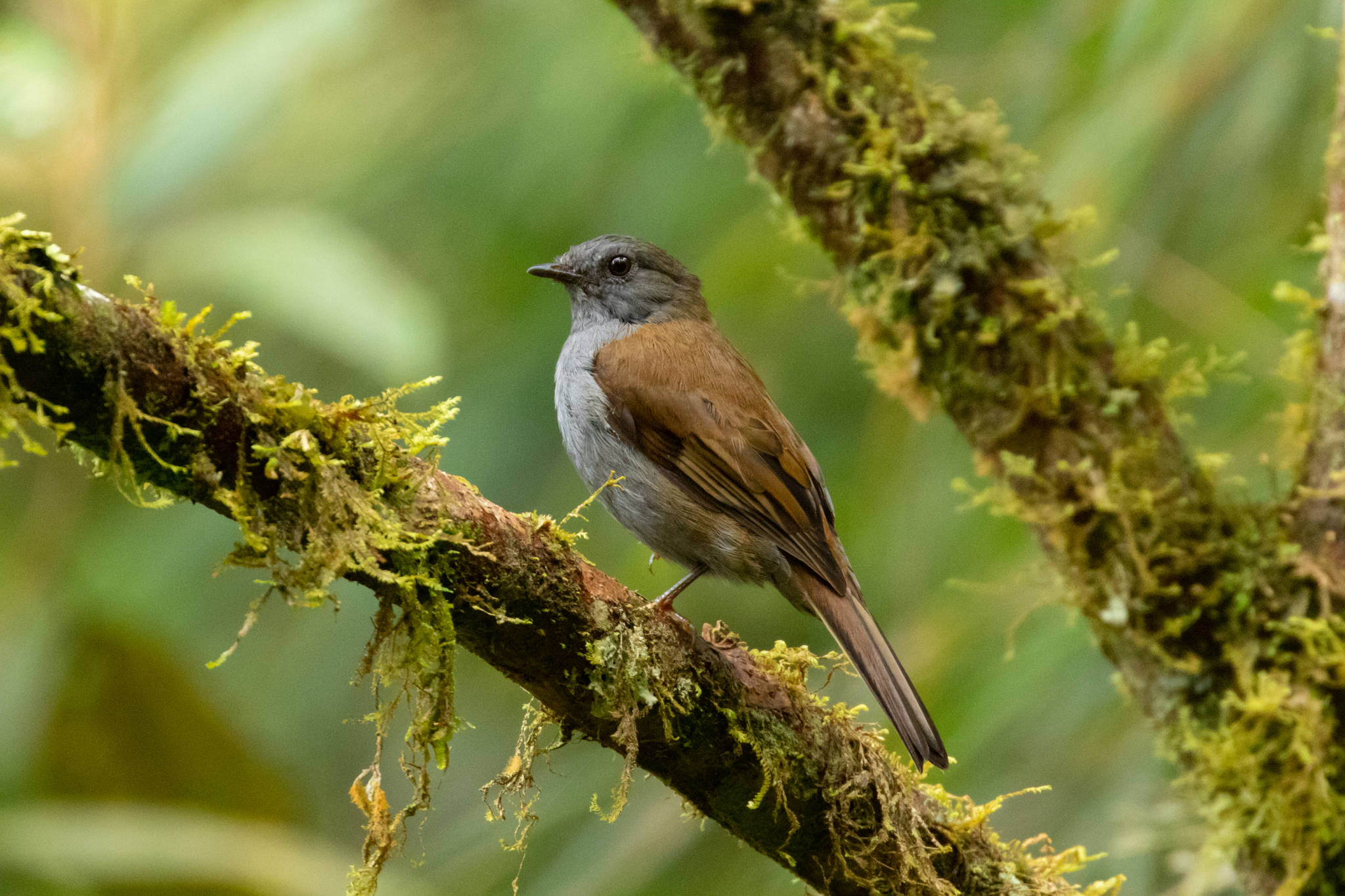
Myadestes ralloides

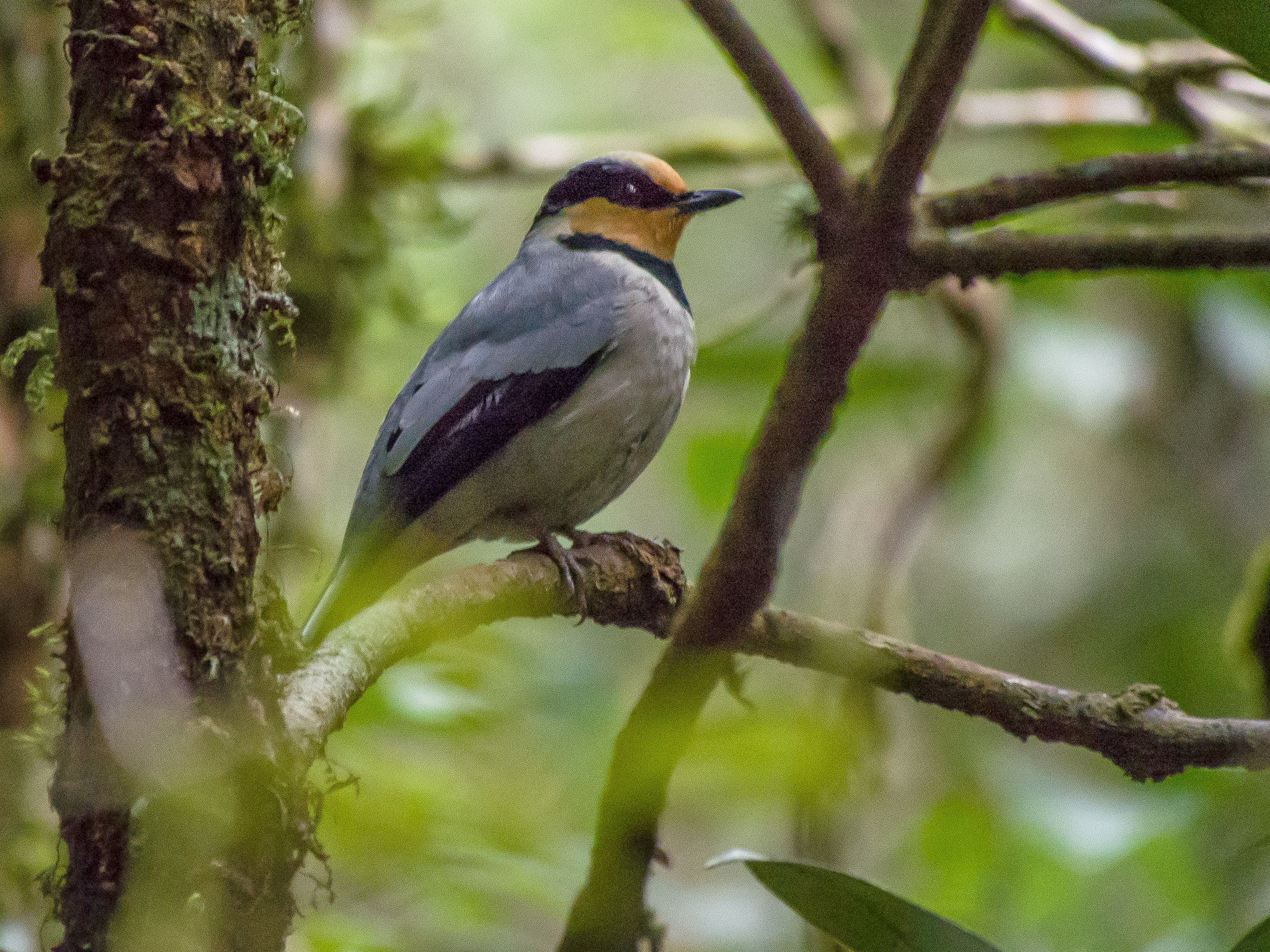
Chlamydochaera jefferyi

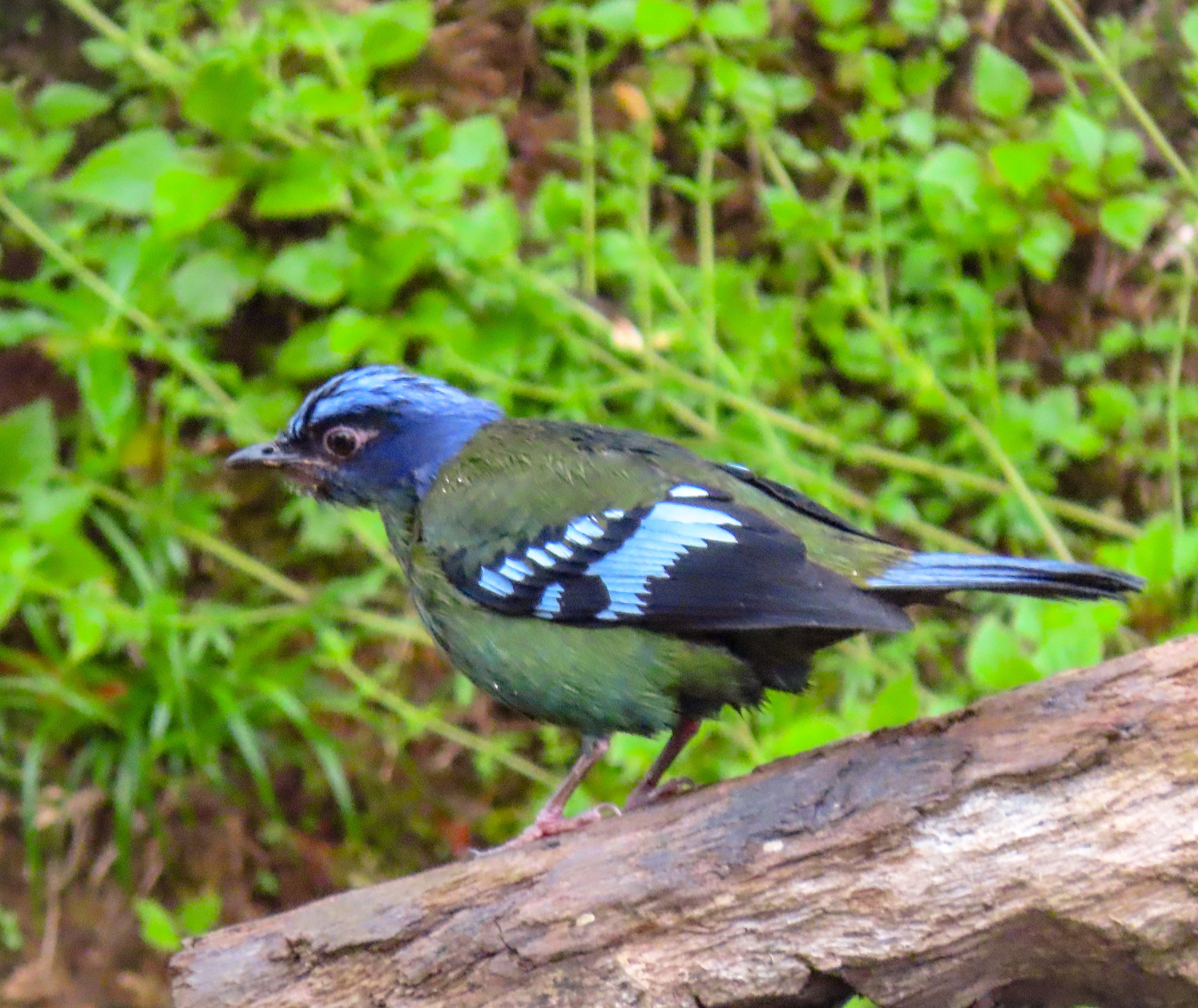
Cochoa viridis

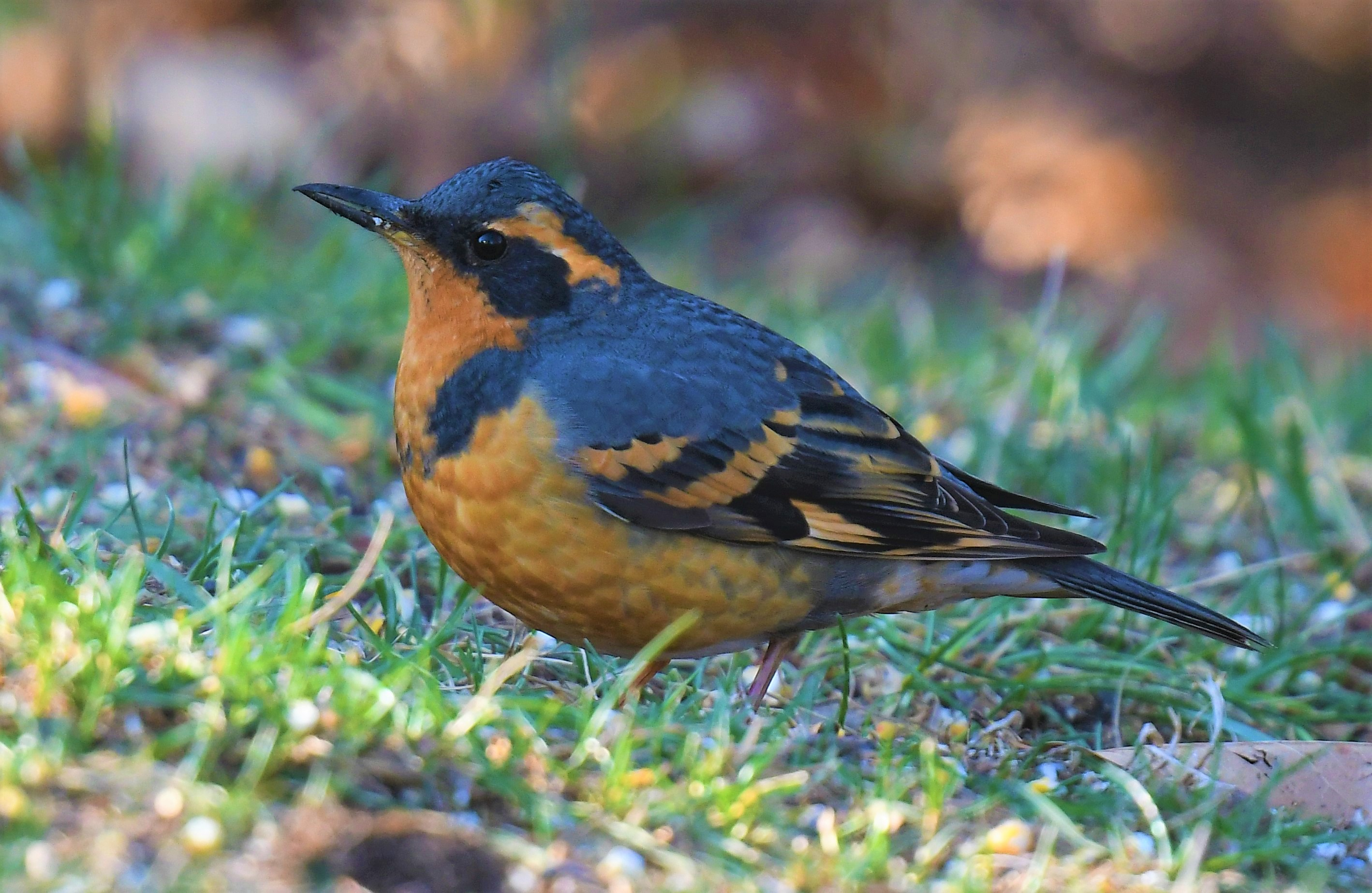
Ixoreus naevius

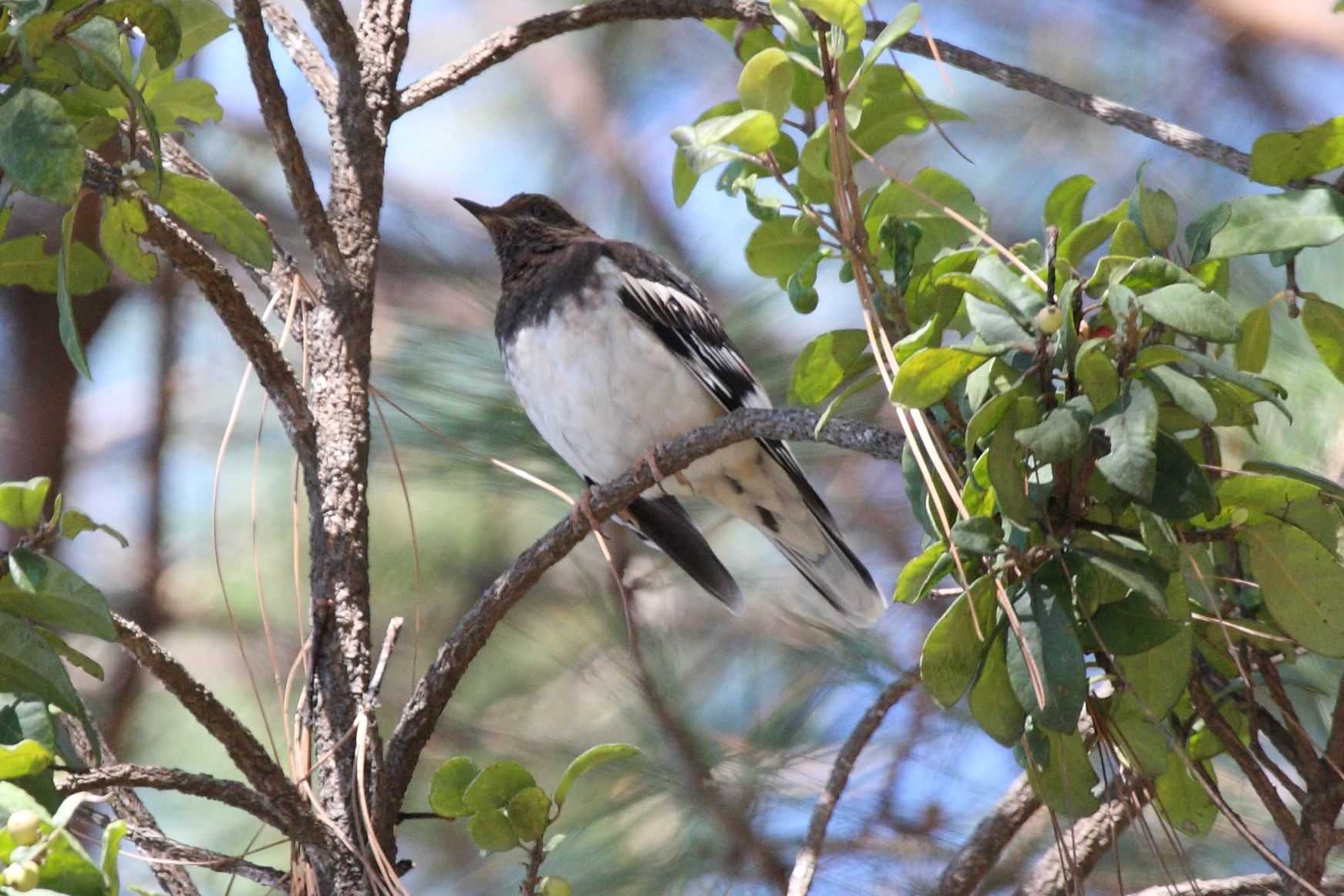
Ridgwayia pinicola

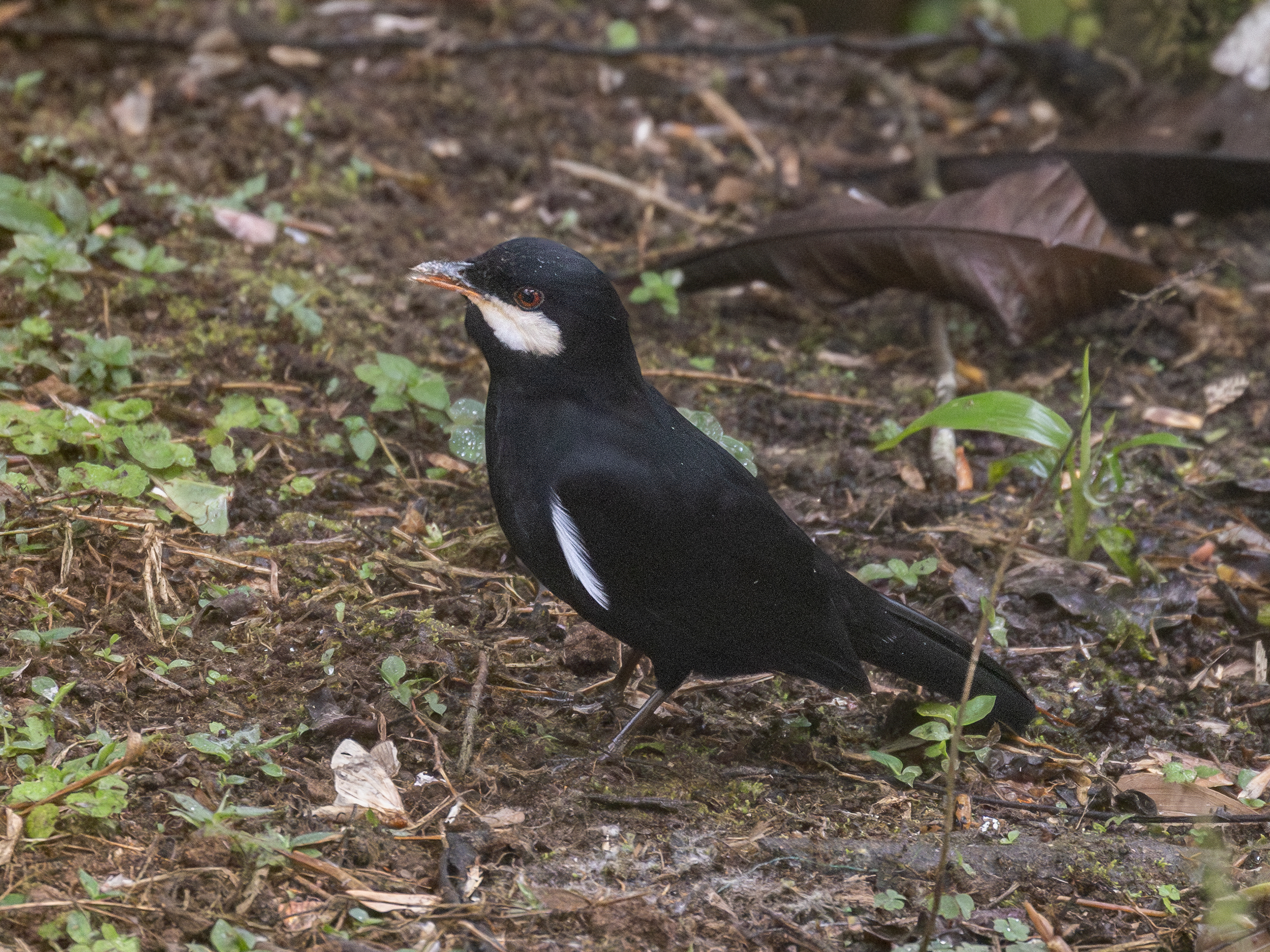
Entomodestes coracinus

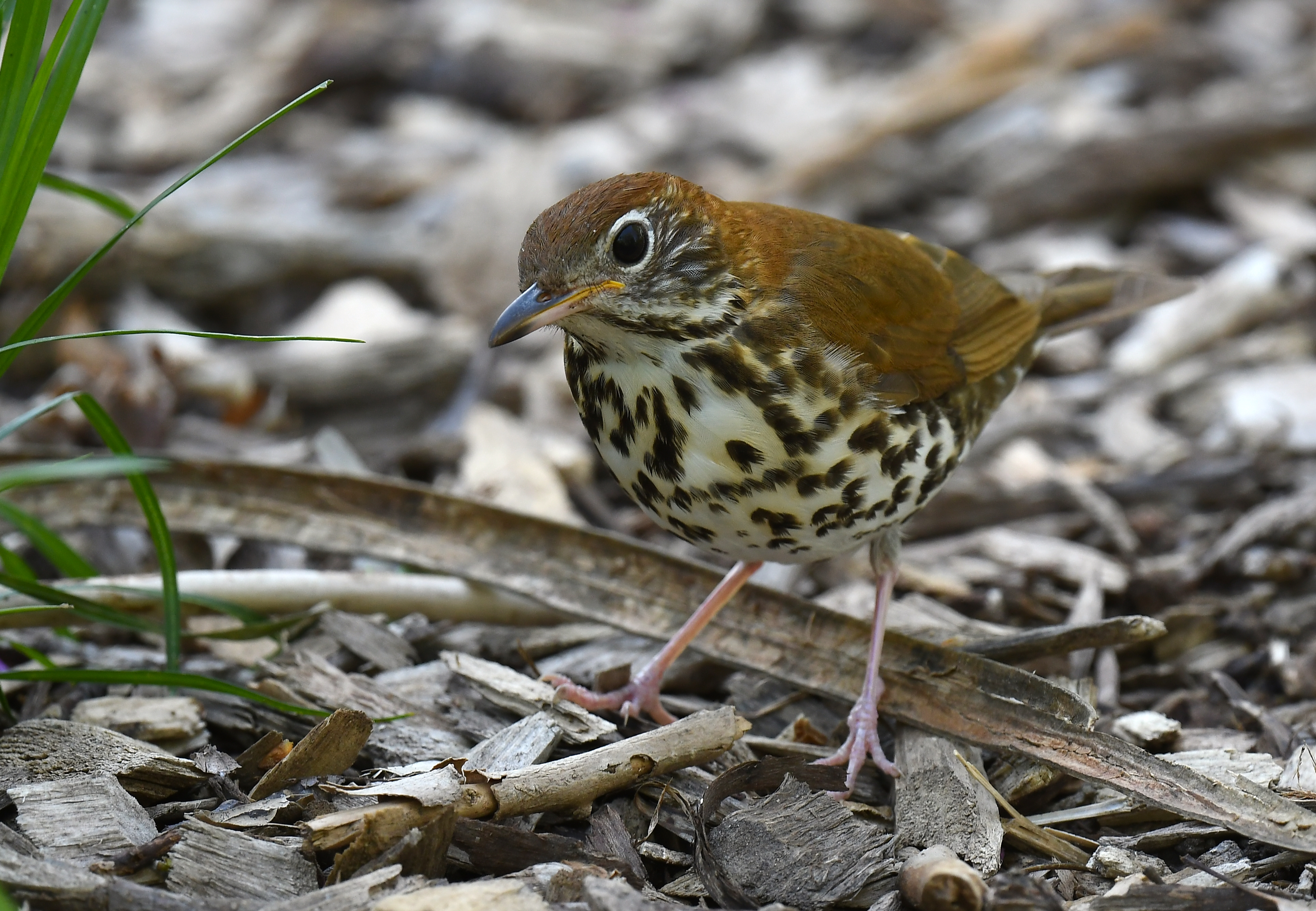
Hylocichla mustelina

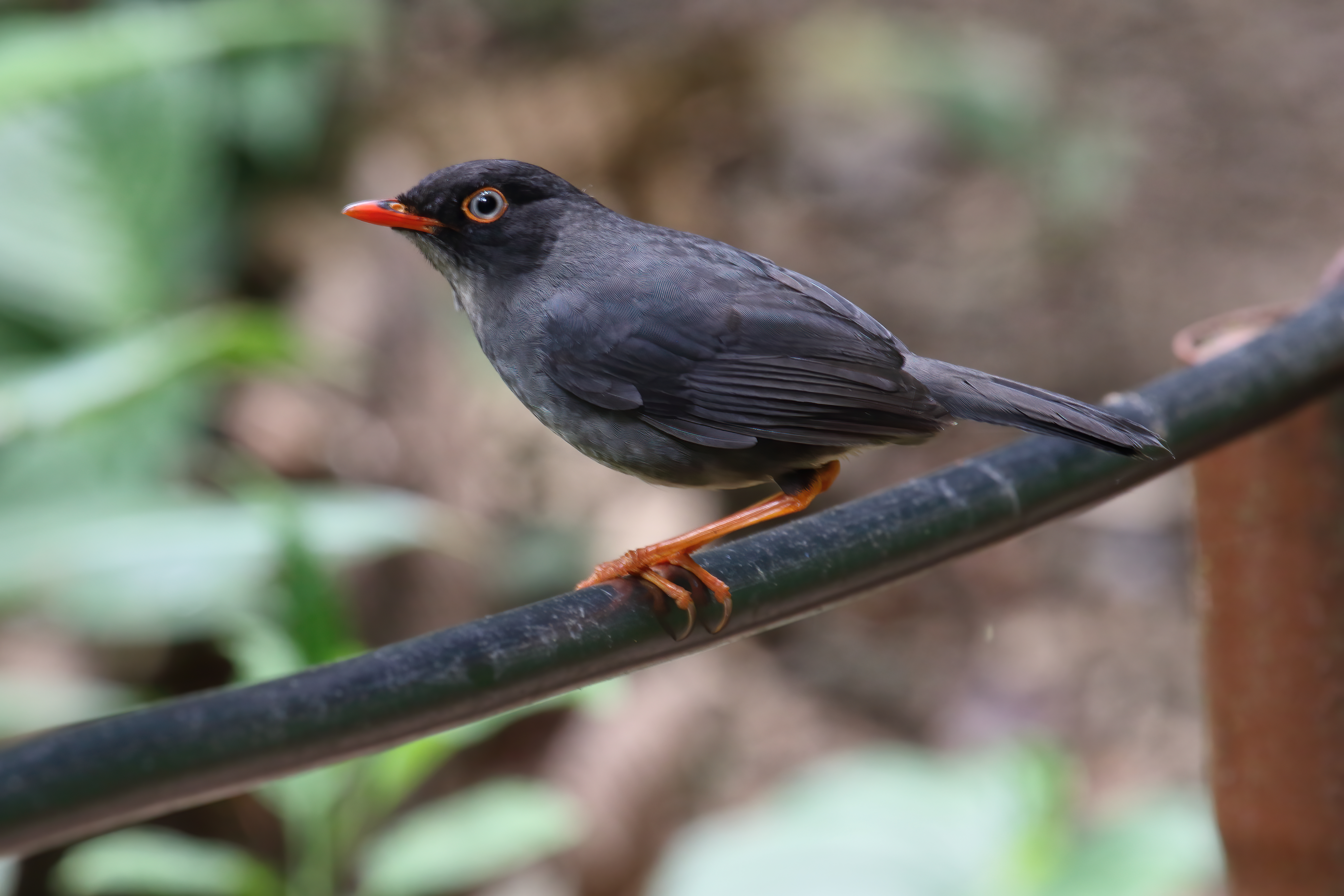
Catharus fuscater

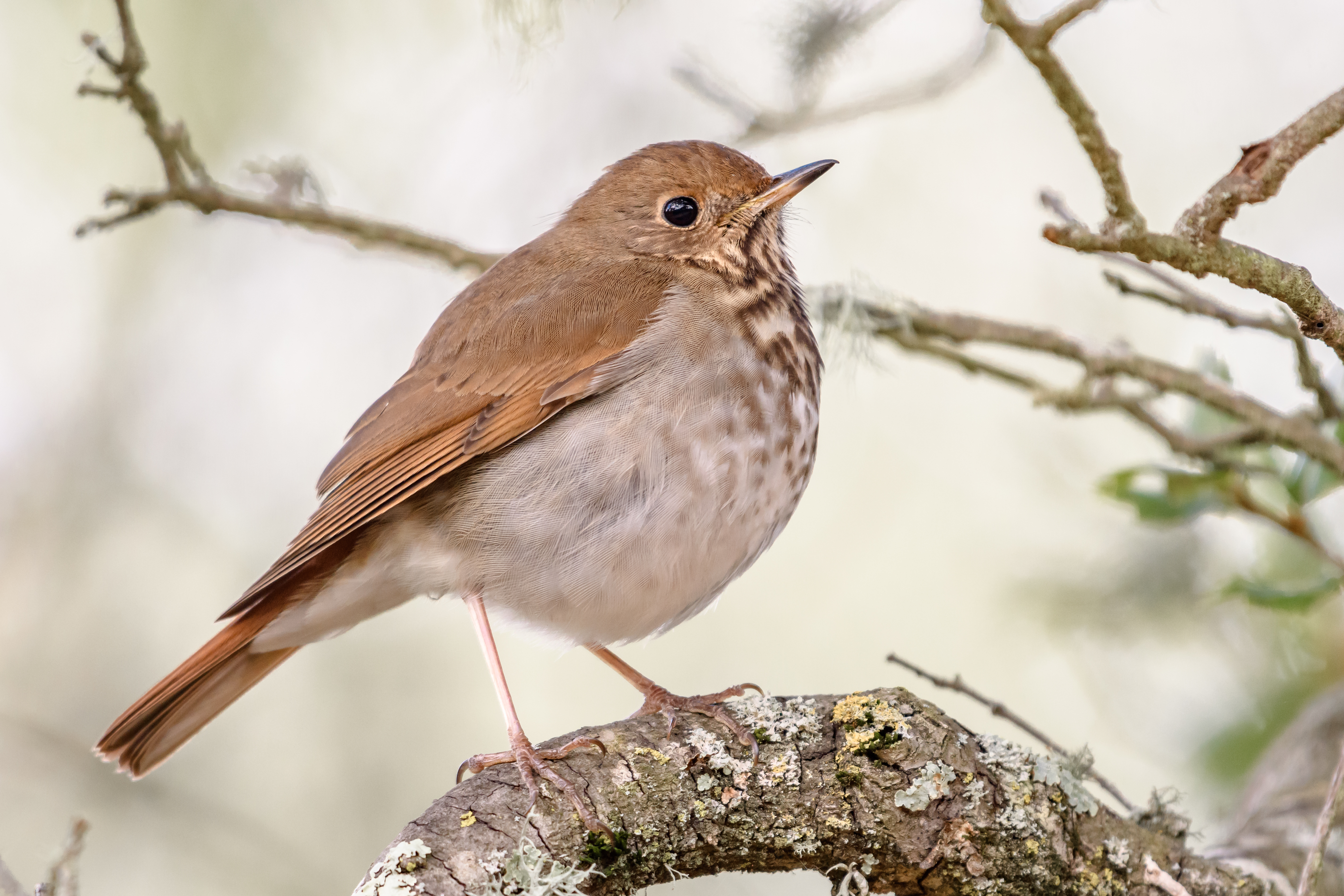
Catharus guttatus

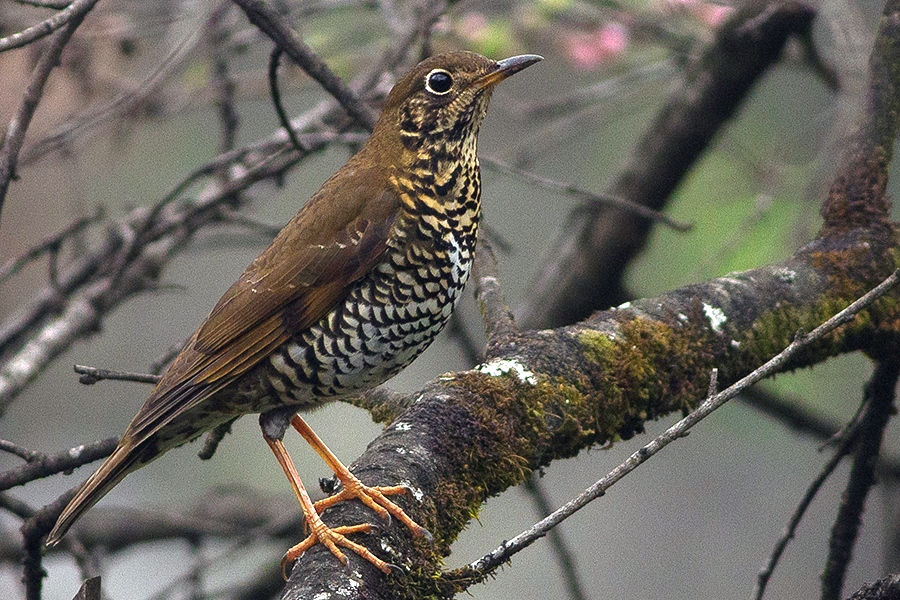
Zoothera mollissima

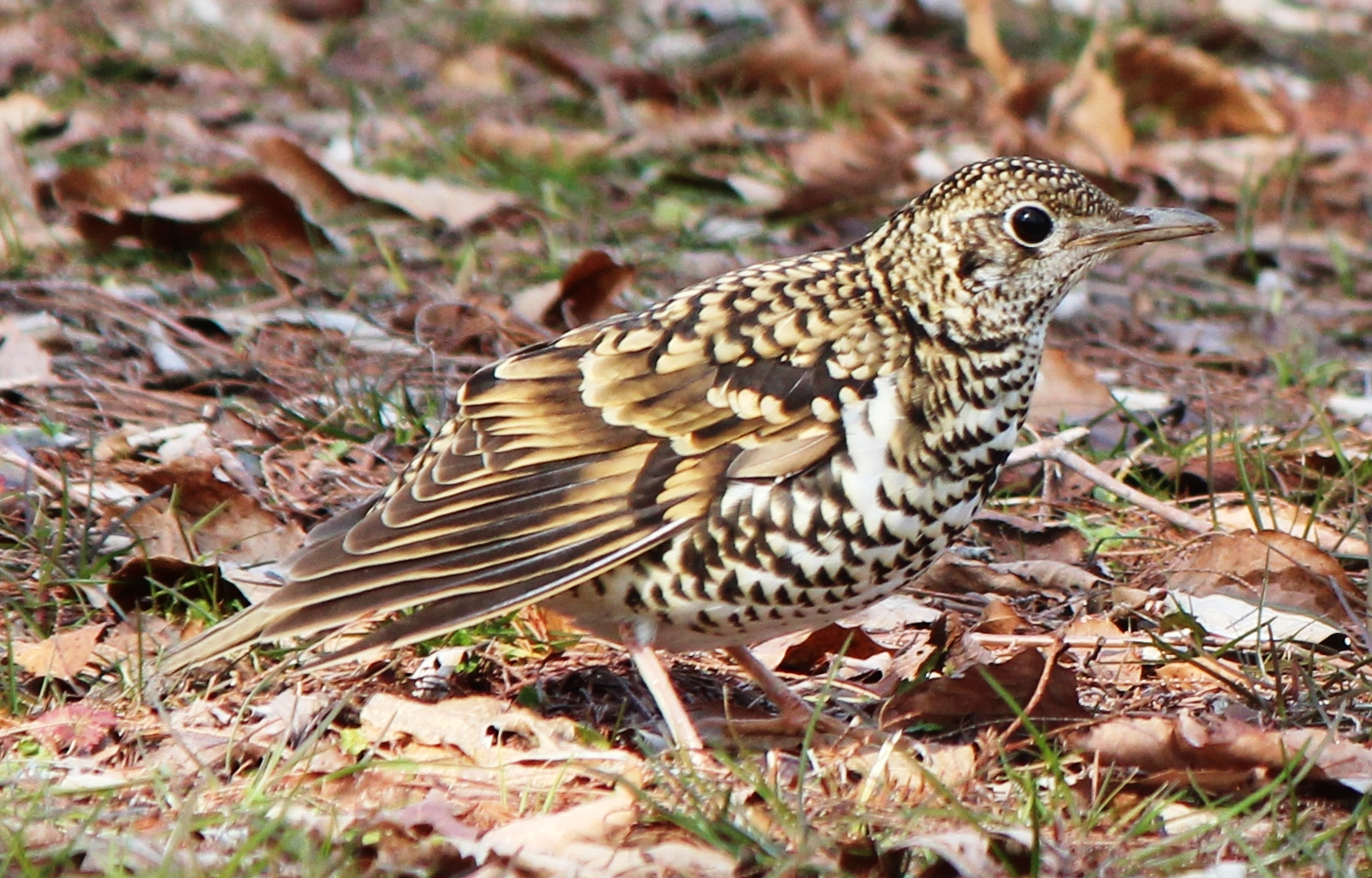
Zoothera aurea

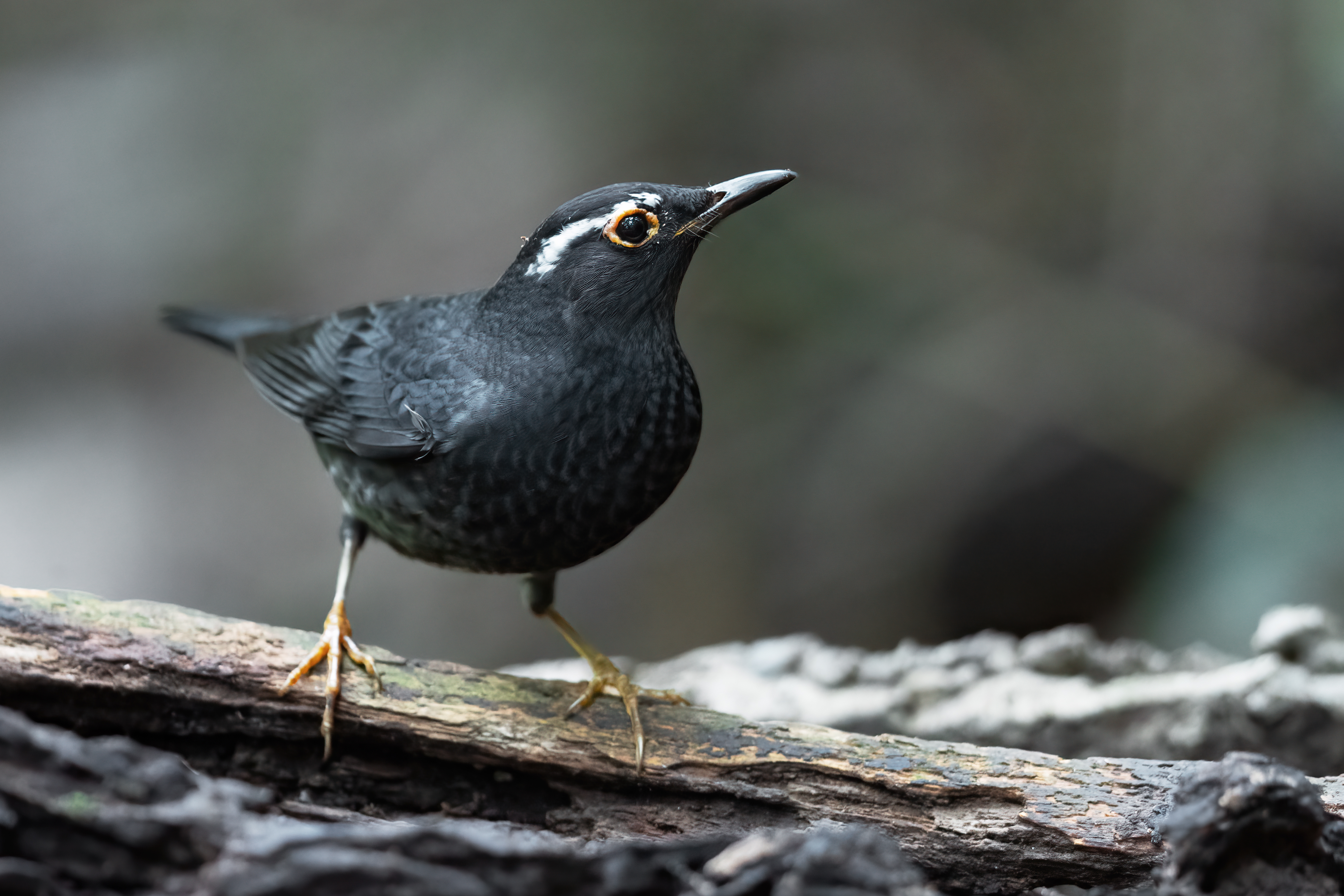
Geokichla sibirica

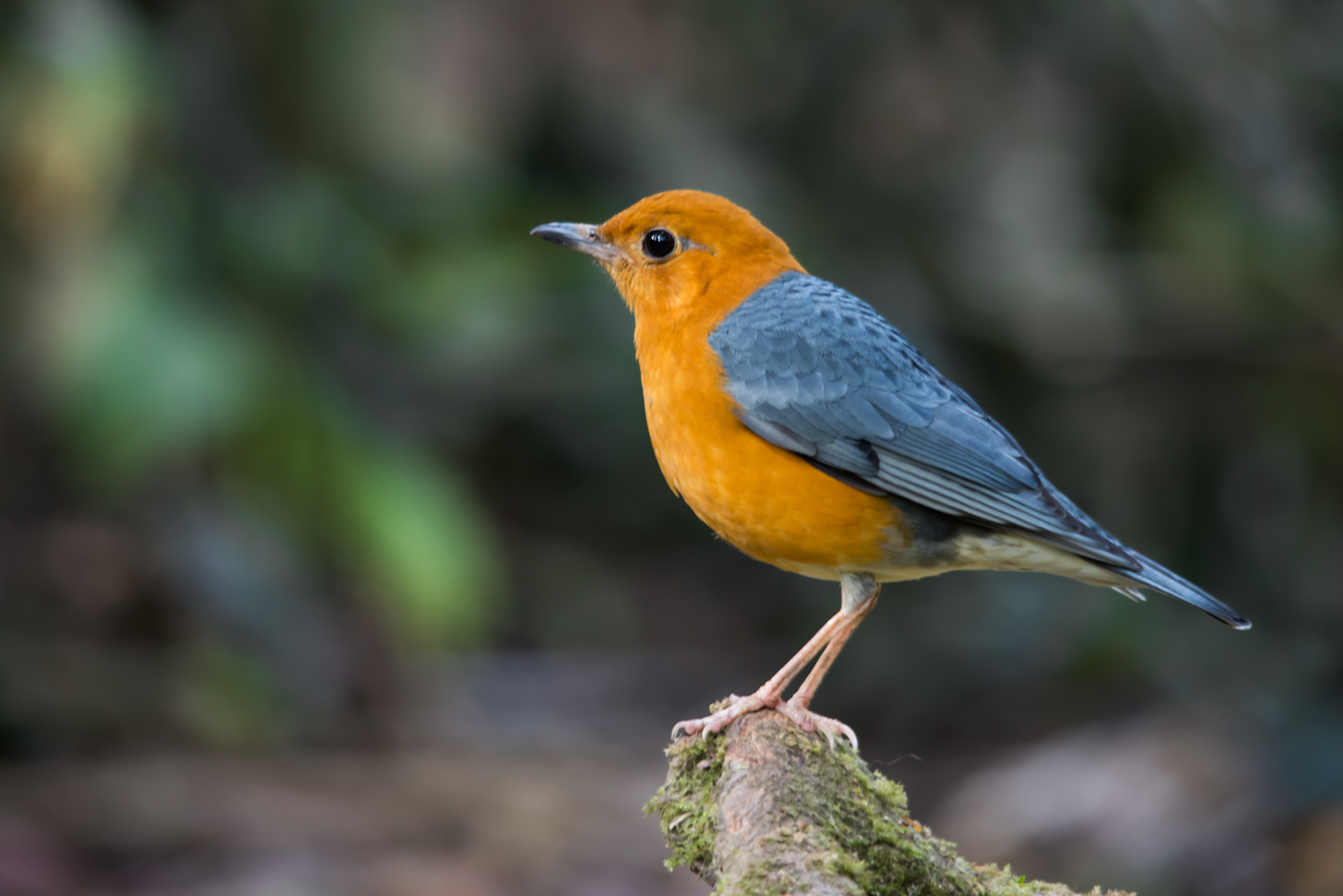
Geokichla citrina

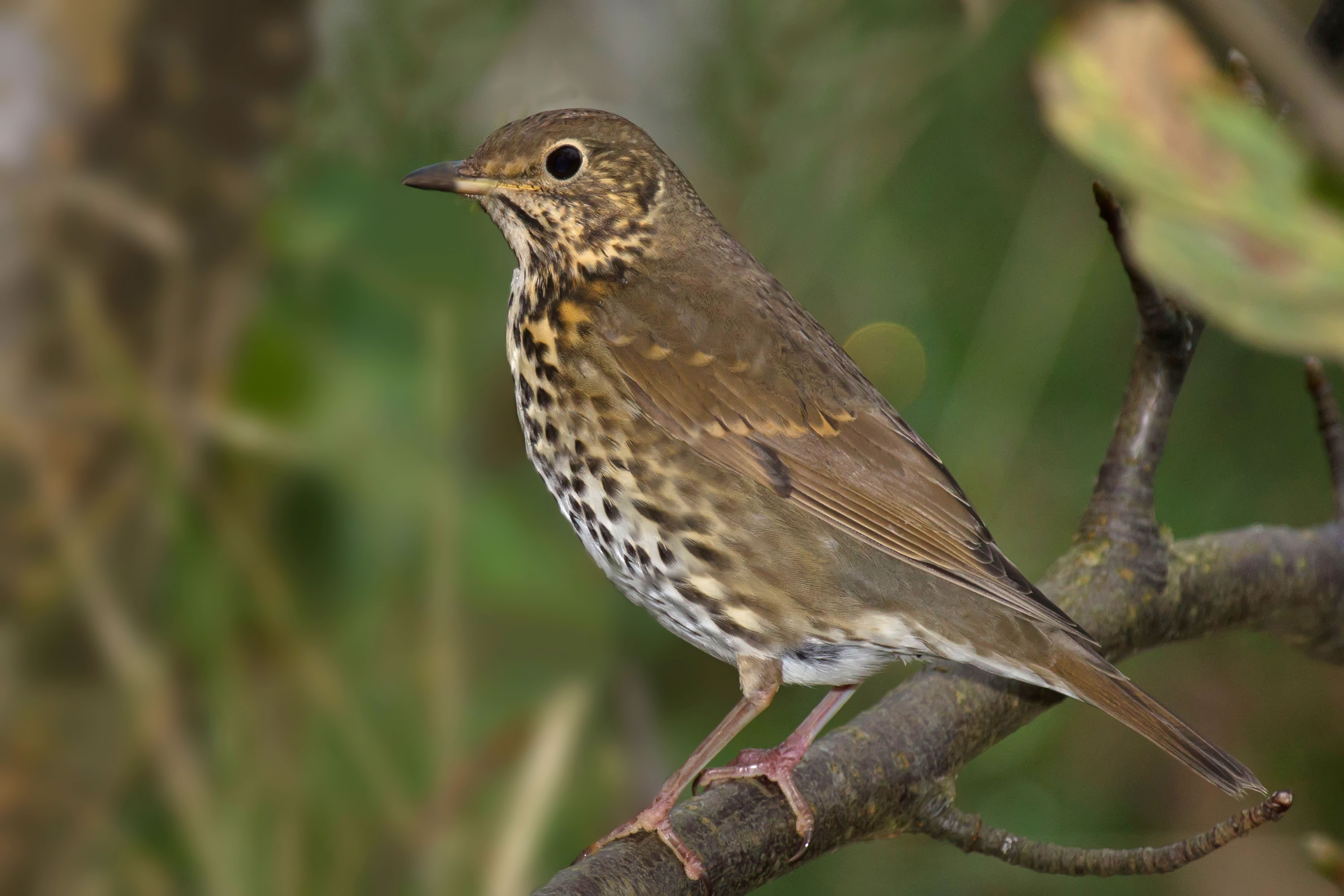
Turdus philomelos

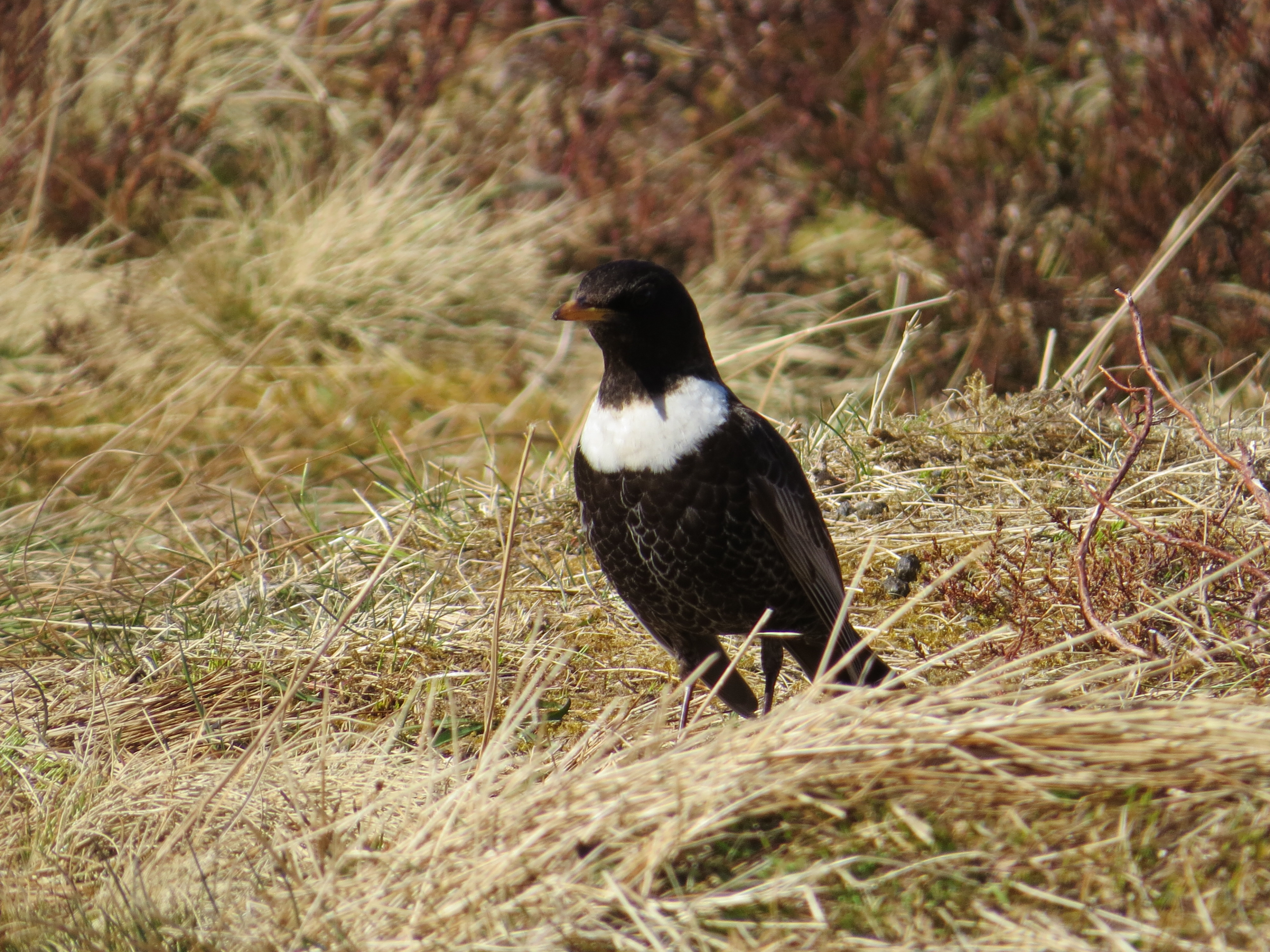
Turdus torquatus

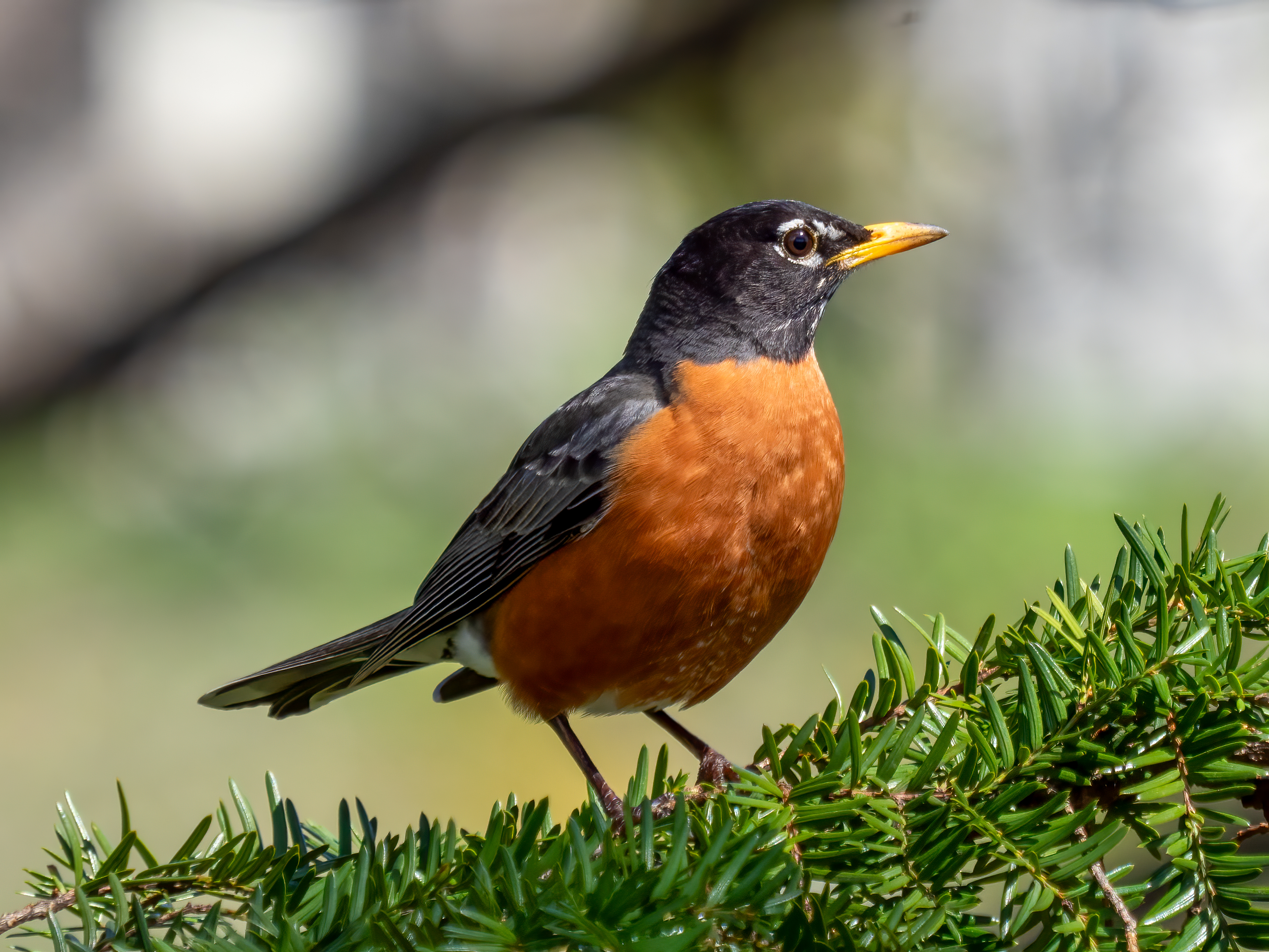
Turdus migratorius

Common name	Binomial name + authority	IOC sequence
Grandala	Grandala coelicolor Hodgson, 1843	1
Mountain bluebird	Sialia currucoides (Bechstein, 1798)	2
Western bluebird	Sialia mexicana Swainson, 1832	3
Eastern bluebird	Sialia sialis (Linnaeus, 1758)	4
Finsch's rufous thrush	Stizorhina finschi (Sharpe, 1870)	5
Fraser's rufous thrush	Stizorhina fraseri (Strickland, 1844)	6
White-tailed ant thrush	Neocossyphus poensis (Strickland, 1844)	7
Red-tailed ant thrush	Neocossyphus rufus (Fischer, GA & Reichenow, 1884)	8
Boulder chat	Pinarornis plumosus Sharpe, 1876	9
Brown-backed solitaire	Myadestes occidentalis Stejneger, 1882	10
Slate-colored solitaire	Myadestes unicolor Sclater, PL, 1857	11
Townsend's solitaire	Myadestes townsendi (Audubon, 1838)	12
Kamao (X)	Myadestes myadestinus (Stejneger, 1887)	13
Amaui (X)	Myadestes woahensis (Bloxam, A, 1899)	14
Olomao	Myadestes lanaiensis (Wilson, SB, 1891)	15
Omao	Myadestes obscurus (Gmelin, JF, 1789)	16
Puaiohi	Myadestes palmeri (Rothschild, 1893)	17
Cuban solitaire	Myadestes elisabeth (Lembeye, 1850)	18
Rufous-throated solitaire	Myadestes genibarbis Swainson, 1838	19
Black-faced solitaire	Myadestes melanops Salvin, 1865	20
Varied solitaire	Myadestes coloratus Nelson, 1912	21
Andean solitaire	Myadestes ralloides (d'Orbigny, 1840)	22
Fruithunter	Chlamydochaera jefferyi Sharpe, 1887	23
Purple cochoa	Cochoa purpurea Hodgson, 1836	24
Green cochoa	Cochoa viridis Hodgson, 1836	25
Sumatran cochoa	Cochoa beccarii Salvadori, 1879	26
Javan cochoa	Cochoa azurea (Temminck, 1824)	27
Varied thrush	Ixoreus naevius (Gmelin, JF, 1789)	28
Aztec thrush	Ridgwayia pinicola (Sclater, PL, 1859)	29
Rufous-brown solitaire	Cichlopsis leucogenys Cabanis, 1851	30
Black solitaire	Entomodestes coracinus (Berlepsch, 1897)	31
White-eared solitaire	Entomodestes leucotis (Tschudi, 1844)	32
Wood thrush	Hylocichla mustelina (Gmelin, JF, 1789)	33
Yellow-throated nightingale-thrush	Catharus dryas (Gould, 1855)	34
Speckled nightingale-thrush	Catharus maculatus (Sclater, PL, 1858)	35
Orange-billed nightingale-thrush	Catharus aurantiirostris (Hartlaub, 1850)	36
Black-headed nightingale-thrush	Catharus mexicanus (Bonaparte, 1856)	37
Slaty-backed nightingale-thrush	Catharus fuscater (Lafresnaye, 1845)	38
Swainson's thrush	Catharus ustulatus (Nuttall, 1840)	39
Black-billed nightingale-thrush	Catharus gracilirostris Salvin, 1865	40
Hermit thrush	Catharus guttatus (Pallas, 1811)	41
Russet nightingale-thrush	Catharus occidentalis Sclater, PL, 1859	42
Ruddy-capped nightingale-thrush	Catharus frantzii Cabanis, 1861	43
Grey-cheeked thrush	Catharus minimus (Lafresnaye, 1848)	44
Bicknell's thrush	Catharus bicknelli (Ridgway, 1882)	45
Veery	Catharus fuscescens (Stephens, 1817)	46
Long-tailed thrush	Zoothera dixoni (Seebohm, 1881)	47
Alpine thrush	Zoothera mollissima (Blyth, 1842)	48
Himalayan thrush	Zoothera salimalii Alström, Rasmussen, Zhao J, Xu J, Dalvi, Cai T, Guan Y, Zhang R, Kalyakin, Lei F & Olsson, 2016	49
Sichuan thrush	Zoothera griseiceps (Delacour, 1930)	50
Long-billed thrush	Zoothera monticola Vigors, 1832	51
Geomalia	Zoothera heinrichi (Stresemann, 1931)	52
Dark-sided thrush	Zoothera marginata Blyth, 1847	53
Everett's thrush	Zoothera everetti (Sharpe, 1892)	54
Sunda thrush	Zoothera andromedae (Temminck, 1826)	55
White's thrush	Zoothera aurea (Holandre, 1825)	56
Scaly thrush	Zoothera dauma (Latham, 1790)	57
Nilgiri thrush	Zoothera neilgherriensis (Blyth, 1847)	58
Sri Lanka thrush	Zoothera imbricata Layard, EL, 1854	59
Amami thrush	Zoothera major (Ogawa, 1905)	60
Bonin thrush (X)	Zoothera terrestris (Kittlitz, 1830)	61
Guadalcanal thrush	Zoothera turipavae Cain & Galbraith, ICJ, 1955	62
Makira thrush	Zoothera margaretae (Mayr, 1935)	63
Russet-tailed thrush	Zoothera heinei (Cabanis, 1851)	64
Fawn-breasted thrush	Zoothera machiki (Forbes, HO, 1884)	65
Bassian thrush	Zoothera lunulata (Latham, 1801)	66
New Britain thrush	Zoothera talaseae (Rothschild & Hartert, EJO, 1926)	67
Bougainville thrush	Zoothera atrigena Ripley & Hadden, 1982	68
Siberian thrush	Geokichla sibirica (Pallas, 1776)	69
Pied thrush	Geokichla wardii (Blyth, 1843)	70
Grey ground thrush	Geokichla princei (Sharpe, 1874)	71
Black-eared ground thrush	Geokichla camaronensis Sharpe, 1905	72
Spotted ground thrush	Geokichla guttata (Vigors, 1831)	73
Spot-winged thrush	Geokichla spiloptera (Blyth, 1847)	74
Crossley's ground thrush	Geokichla crossleyi (Sharpe, 1871)	75
Abyssinian ground thrush	Geokichla piaggiae (Bouvier, 1877)	76
Oberländer's ground thrush	Geokichla oberlaenderi Sassi, 1914	77
Orange ground thrush	Geokichla gurneyi (Hartlaub, 1864)	78
Orange-headed thrush	Geokichla citrina (Latham, 1790)	79
Buru thrush	Geokichla dumasi Rothschild, 1899	80
Seram thrush	Geokichla joiceyi (Rothschild & Hartert, EJO, 1921)	81
Orange-sided thrush	Geokichla peronii (Vieillot, 1818)	82
Slaty-backed thrush	Geokichla schistacea Meyer, AB, 1884	83
Chestnut-capped thrush	Geokichla interpres (Temminck, 1828)	84
Enggano thrush	Geokichla leucolaema Salvadori, 1892	85
Chestnut-backed thrush	Geokichla dohertyi Hartert, EJO, 1896	86
Ashy thrush	Geokichla cinerea Bourns & Worcester, 1894	87
Red-backed thrush	Geokichla erythronota Sclater, PL, 1859	88
Red-and-black thrush	Geokichla mendeni (Neumann, 1939)	89
Ethiopian thrush	Turdus simensis (Rüppell, 1837)	90
Groundscraper thrush	Turdus litsitsirupa (Smith, A, 1836)	91
Chinese thrush	Turdus mupinensis Laubmann, 1920	92
Song thrush	Turdus philomelos Brehm, CL, 1831	93
Mistle thrush	Turdus viscivorus Linnaeus, 1758	94
African thrush	Turdus pelios Bonaparte, 1850	95
Principe thrush	Turdus xanthorhynchus Salvadori, 1901	96
Sao Tome thrush	Turdus olivaceofuscus Hartlaub, 1852	97
Abyssinian thrush	Turdus abyssinicus Gmelin, JF, 1789	98
Taita thrush	Turdus helleri (Mearns, 1913)	99
Usambara thrush	Turdus roehli Reichenow, 1905	100
Olive thrush	Turdus olivaceus Linnaeus, 1766	101
Kurrichane thrush	Turdus libonyana (Smith, A, 1836)	102
Comoro thrush	Turdus bewsheri Newton, E, 1877	103
Bare-eyed thrush	Turdus tephronotus Cabanis, 1878	104
Karoo thrush	Turdus smithi Bonaparte, 1850	105
Somali thrush	Turdus ludoviciae (Lort Phillips, 1895)	106
Chinese blackbird	Turdus mandarinus Bonaparte, 1850	107
Redwing	Turdus iliacus Linnaeus, 1758	108
Common blackbird	Turdus merula Linnaeus, 1758	109
Yemen thrush	Turdus menachensis Ogilvie-Grant, 1913	110
Taiwan thrush	Turdus niveiceps (Hellmayr, 1919)	111
Grey-winged blackbird	Turdus boulboul (Latham, 1790)	112
Indian blackbird	Turdus simillimus Jerdon, 1839	113
Tickell's thrush	Turdus unicolor Tickell, 1833	114
Black-breasted thrush	Turdus dissimilis Blyth, 1847	115
Japanese thrush	Turdus cardis Temminck, 1831	116
Grey-backed thrush	Turdus hortulorum Sclater, PL, 1863	117
Eyebrowed thrush	Turdus obscurus Gmelin, JF, 1789	118
Pale thrush	Turdus pallidus Gmelin, JF, 1789	119
Grey-sided thrush	Turdus feae (Salvadori, 1887)	120
Brown-headed thrush	Turdus chrysolaus Temminck, 1832	121
Izu thrush	Turdus celaenops Stejneger, 1887	122
Mindoro island thrush	Turdus mindorensis Ogilvie-Grant, 1896	123
Luzon island thrush	Turdus thomassoni (Seebohm, 1894)	124
Mindanao island thrush	Turdus nigrorum Ogilvie-Grant, 1896	125
Wallacean island thrush	Turdus schlegelii P. L. Sclater, 1861	126
Christmas island thrush	Turdus erythropleurus Sharpe, 1887	127
Sundiac island thrush	Turdus javanicus Horsfield, 1821	128
Moluccan island thrush	Turdus deningeri Stresemann, 1912	129
Papuan island thrush	Turdus papuensis (De Vis, 1890)	130
Bismarck island thrush	Turdus heinrothi Rothschild & Hartert, 1924	131
Bougainville island thrush	Turdus bougainvillei Mayr, 1941	132
Solomons island thrush	Turdus kulambangrae Mayr, 1941	133
Vanikoro island thrush	Turdus vanikorensis Quoy & Gaimard, 1830	134
White-headed island thrush	Turdus pritzbueri E. L. Layard, 1878	135
New Caledonian island thrush	Turdus xanthopus J. R. Forster, 1844	136
Tasman Sea island thrush (X)	Turdus poliocephalus Latham, 1801	137
Samoan island thrush	Turdus samoensis Tristram, 1879	138
Fiji island thrush	Turdus ruficeps (E. P. Ramsay, 1876)	139
Tibetan blackbird	Turdus maximus (Seebohm, 1881)	140
White-backed thrush	Turdus kessleri (Przevalski, 1876)	141
Fieldfare	Turdus pilaris Linnaeus, 1758	142
Ring ouzel	Turdus torquatus Linnaeus, 1758	143
Black-throated thrush	Turdus atrogularis Jarocki, 1819	144
Red-throated thrush	Turdus ruficollis Pallas, 1776	145
Dusky thrush	Turdus eunomus Temminck, 1831	146
Naumann's thrush	Turdus naumanni Temminck, 1820	147
Chestnut thrush	Turdus rubrocanus Gray, JE & Gray, GR, 1847	148
White-collared blackbird	Turdus albocinctus Royle, 1840	149
Sulawesi thrush	Turdus turdoides (Hartert, EJO, 1896)	150
American robin	Turdus migratorius Linnaeus, 1766	151
Black thrush	Turdus infuscatus (Lafresnaye, 1844)	152
Rufous-collared thrush	Turdus rufitorques Hartlaub, 1844	153
Sooty thrush	Turdus nigrescens Cabanis, 1861	154
Western red-legged thrush	Turdus plumbeus Linnaeus, 1758	155
Eastern red-legged thrush	Turdus ardosiaceus Vieillot, 1822	156
Grand Cayman thrush (X)	Turdus ravidus (Cory, 1886)	157
White-chinned thrush	Turdus aurantius Gmelin, JF, 1789	158
Forest thrush	Turdus lherminieri Lafresnaye, 1844	159
Mountain thrush	Turdus plebejus Cabanis, 1861	160
Pale-eyed thrush	Turdus leucops Taczanowski, 1877	161
White-eyed thrush	Turdus jamaicensis Gmelin, JF, 1789	162
La Selle thrush	Turdus swalesi (Wetmore, 1927)	163
Chestnut-bellied thrush	Turdus fulviventris Sclater, PL, 1858	164
Plumbeous-backed thrush	Turdus reevei Lawrence, 1869	165
Chiguanco thrush	Turdus chiguanco d'Orbigny & Lafresnaye, 1837	166
Andean slaty thrush	Turdus nigriceps Cabanis, 1874	167
Glossy-black thrush	Turdus serranus Tschudi, 1844	168
Black-hooded thrush	Turdus olivater (Lafresnaye, 1848)	169
Great thrush	Turdus fuscater d'Orbigny & Lafresnaye, 1837	170
Austral thrush	Turdus falcklandii Quoy & Gaimard, 1824	171
Lawrence's thrush	Turdus lawrencii Coues, 1880	172
Pantepui thrush	Turdus murinus Salvin, 1885	173
Blacksmith thrush	Turdus subalaris (Seebohm, 1887)	174
Creamy-bellied thrush	Turdus amaurochalinus Cabanis, 1851	175
Tristan thrush	Turdus eremita (Gould, 1855)	176
Maranon thrush	Turdus maranonicus Taczanowski, 1880	177
Black-billed thrush	Turdus ignobilis Sclater, PL, 1858	178
Campina thrush	Turdus arthuri (Chubb, C, 1914)	179
Yellow-legged thrush	Turdus flavipes Vieillot, 1818	180
White-throated thrush	Turdus assimilis Cabanis, 1851	181
Dagua thrush	Turdus daguae Berlepsch, 1897	182
White-necked thrush	Turdus albicollis Vieillot, 1818	183
Rufous-backed thrush	Turdus rufopalliatus Lafresnaye, 1840	184
Pale-vented thrush	Turdus obsoletus Lawrence, 1862	185
Pale-breasted thrush	Turdus leucomelas Vieillot, 1818	186
Cocoa thrush	Turdus fumigatus Lichtenstein, MHC, 1823	187
Hauxwell's thrush	Turdus hauxwelli Lawrence, 1869	188
Rufous-bellied thrush	Turdus rufiventris Vieillot, 1818	189
Clay-colored thrush	Turdus grayi Bonaparte, 1838	190
Spectacled thrush	Turdus nudigenis Lafresnaye, 1848	191
Ecuadorian thrush	Turdus maculirostris Berlepsch & Taczanowski, 1884	192
Varzea thrush	Turdus sanchezorum O'Neill, Lane & Naka, 2011	193
Unicolored thrush	Turdus haplochrous Todd, 1931	194
