= Unicolored thrush =

Conservation status
- Near Threatened (IUCN 3.1)

Scientific classification
- Kingdom: Animalia
- Phylum: Chordata
- Class: Aves
- Order: Passeriformes
- Family: Turdidae
- Genus: Turdus
- Species: T. haplochrous

Binomial name
- Turdus haplochrous Todd, 1931

Species of bird

The unicolored thrush (Turdus haplochrous) is a Near Threatened species of bird in the family Turdidae. It is endemic to Bolivia.

== Taxonomy and systematics ==
The unicolored thrush was originally described in 1931 as Turdus haplochrous and has retained that binomial ever since. It is a sister to the varzea thrush (T. sanchezorum) as a member of the spectacled thrush (T. nudigenis) complex.

The unicolored thrush is monotypic.

== Description ==
The unicolored thrush is 23 to 24 cm (9.1 to 9.4 in) long and weighs about 84 g (3.0 oz). The sexes have the same plumage. Adults have an olive-brown head, upperparts, wings, and tail. Their chin and throat are whitish with dark streaks. Their underparts are a slightly paler olive-brown than their upperparts. They have a dark iris, a brownish yellow bill, and brown legs and feet.

== Distribution and habitat ==
The unicolored thrush is known from only a small area of northern Bolivia, in southeastern Beni and western Santa Cruz departments. It inhabits semi-deciduous forest, somewhat open forest, várzea forest, and gallery forest. In elevation it is known from the narrow range of 350 to 450 m (1,100 to 1,500 ft).

== Behavior ==
=== Movement ===
The unicolored thrush is believed to be a sedentary year-round resident.

=== Feeding ===
Nothing is known about the unicolored thrush's diet or foraging behavior.

=== Breeding ===
Nothing is known about the unicolored thrush's breeding biology.

=== Vocalization ===
The unicolored thrush appears to be mostly silent in the dry season except perhaps at dawn and dusk, but responds readily to playback. It makes a "mewing" call that is similar to those of the other members of the T. nudigenis complex. Its song is "a series of whistled phrases, similar to that of T. hauxwelli", which see here.

== Status ==
The IUCN has assessed the unicolor thrush as Near Threatened. It is known from only a few sites; though its estimated overall range is 122,000 km^{2} (47,000 sq mi), its actual area of occupancy is not known and thought to be much smaller. Its estimated population of between 2500 and 10,000 mature individuals is believed to be decreasing. "While until recently the species' habitat was not considered under threat, deforestation within the range has been increasing tremendously since around 2016. The main driver for the conversion of lowland forests in Beni and Santa Cruz is agro-industry farming." It is a "[p]oorly known species that regularly escapes detection and for which few life-history details are available".
