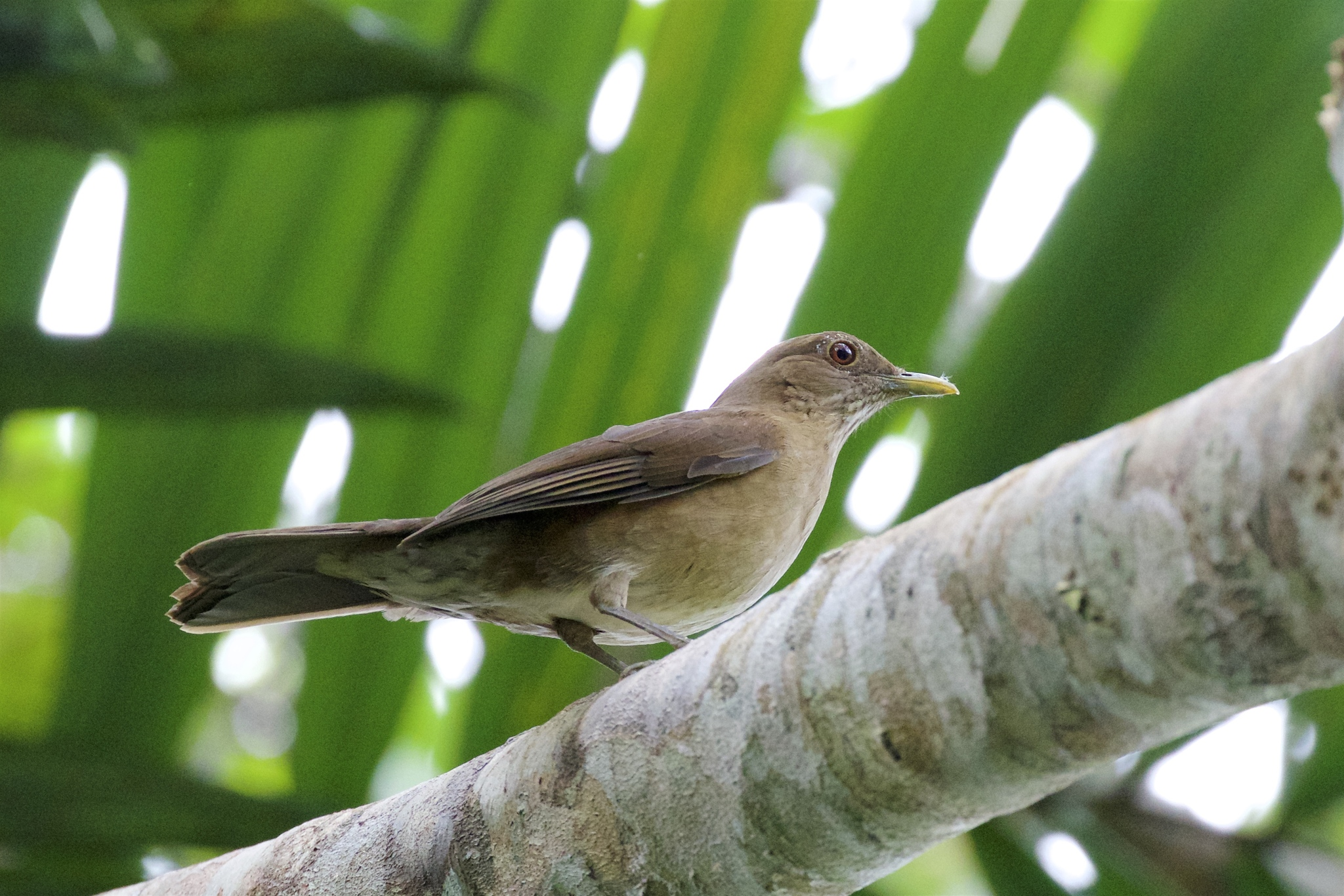

Conservation status
- Least Concern (IUCN 3.1)

Scientific classification
- Kingdom: Animalia
- Phylum: Chordata
- Class: Aves
- Order: Passeriformes
- Family: Turdidae
- Genus: Turdus
- Species: T. sanchezorum

Binomial name
- Turdus sanchezorum O'Neill, Lane & Naka, 2011

= Várzea thrush =

Species of bird

The varzea thrush (Note: The IOC, AviList, and other major taxonomic systems spell the English name with no diacritics. The IOC is the Wikipedia standard for bird names, and AviList is the possible successor to it as the standard, so their spelling is used throughout.) (Turdus sanchezorum) is a species of bird in the family Turdidae. It is found in Brazil, Colombia, and Peru.

== Taxonomy and systematics ==
The varzea thrush has a somewhat complicated taxonomic history. What became its type specimen was collected in 1961 and identified as a Hauxwell's thrush (Turdus hauxwelli). As more specimens were collected, this individual was thought to be a minority color morph of Hauxwell's. Later encounters with the bird determined that its plumage differences were consistently different and its vocalizations were very different from those of Hauxwell's, and in 2011 it was described as a full species. Genetic work showed that it is not closely related to Hauxwell's but is sister to the unicolored thrush (T. haplochrous) as a member of the spectacled thrush (T. nudigenis) complex. The specific epithet honors the authors' "long-time field companions and friends Manuel Sánchez S. and Marta Chávez de Sánchez". The varzea thrush is monotypic.

== Description ==
The varzea thrush is about 22 to 24 cm (8.7 to 9.4 in) long and weighs about 58 g (2.0 oz). The sexes have the same plumage. Adults have a rich sepia-brown head with a dull orange eye-ring. Their upperparts are the same rich sepia-brown. Their flight feathers are dark brown with warm sepia edges on their outer webs. Their tail is grayish brown with warm sepia feather edges. Their chin and throat are warm buffy white with dusky brown streaks. Their upper breast and flanks are caramel-brown, their lower breast slightly lighter, their belly and vent whitish, and their undertail coverts whitish with brown streaks. Their underwing coverts are bright orange-rufous. They have a brown iris, a dull yellow bill with a blackish base, and olive-gray legs and feet.

== Distribution and habitat ==
The varzea thrush is found along river corridors in the central and upper Amazon Basin in Brazil, Colombia, and Peru. Its range includes the Mayo, Napo, Ucayali, Urubamba, Purus, Madeira, Preto, and upper Amazon (Solimões) rivers, and the lower Amazon to somewhat beyond the mouth of the Madeira. The species is primarily a bird of várzea forest. Howerver, along the Mayo River in Peru's Department of San Martín it inhabits forest and savanna on white sand soils, though these are near várzea areas. This river differs from the others: It is a blackwater river rather than a whitewater river like the others. Overall it ranges in elevation from about 80 to 1,100 m (300 to 3,600 ft) but in San Martín is found only above 800 m (2,600 ft). As a possible addition to the species' well-known range, two recordings believed to be of the species were made in eastern Ecuador in 2022.

== Behavior ==
=== Movement ===
The varzea thrush is believed to be a year-round resident.

=== Feeding ===
The varzea thrush is probably omnivorous though the only food items documented are fruits. It apparently forages singly and in small groups, and generally in the forest's lower levels and on the ground.

=== Breeding ===
The varzea thrush's breeding season appears to start near the beginning of the rainy season in December or January. Nothing else is known about the species' breeding biology.

=== Vocalization ===
The varzea thrush's song is "a slow, mellow caroling in which individual phrases are slurred". Its phrases are short (four to ten notes) and are often separated by two seconds or more. A characteristic call is "a rising, querulous, mewing". Other calls include "two rapid series of cuk notes, and some cuk notes followed by one or more musical reedy notes".

== Status ==
The IUCN has assessed the varzea thrush as being of Least Concern. Its population size is not known and is believed to be decreasing. No immediate threats have been identified. It is considered overall locally common though in Colombia is known from very few sites.
