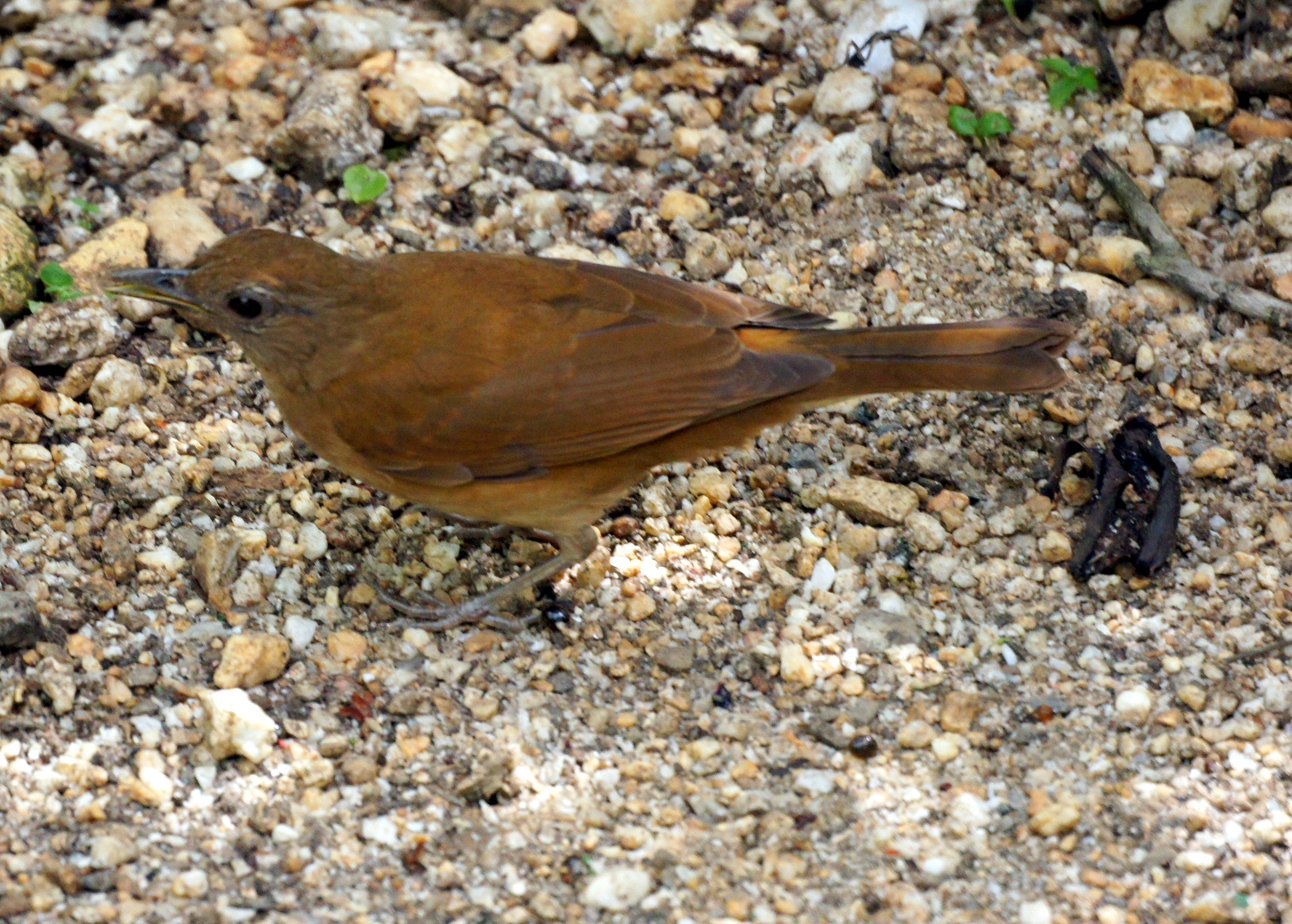

Conservation status
- Least Concern (IUCN 3.1)

Scientific classification
- Kingdom: Animalia
- Phylum: Chordata
- Class: Aves
- Order: Passeriformes
- Family: Turdidae
- Genus: Turdus
- Species: T. fumigatus

Binomial name
- Turdus fumigatus Lichtenstein, MHC, 1823

= Cocoa thrush =

Species of bird

The cocoa thrush (Turdus fumigatus) is a species of bird in the family Turdidae. It is found on St. Vincent, Grenada, and Trinidad and in Argentina, Brazil, Colombia, French Guiana, Guyana, Suriname, and Venezuela.

== Taxonomy and systematics ==
The cocoa thrush was originally described in 1823 with the binomial Turdus fumigatus and has kept that binomial ever since.

However, its taxonomy since its description is complicated and as of early 2026 remains unsettled. During the twentieth century different authors included one or both of what are now Hauxwell's thrush (T. hauxwelli) and the pale-vented thrush (T. obsoletus) as subspecies. They each attained full species status by the end of the century.

The IOC, BirdLife International's Handbook of the Birds of the World, and AviList assign it these five subspecies:

- T. f. aquilonalis (Cherrie, 1909)
- T. f. orinocensis Zimmer, JT & Phelps, WH, 1955
- T. f. fumigatus Lichtenstein, MHC, 1823
- T. f. bondi Deignan, 1951
- T. f. personus (Barbour, 1911)

However, the Clements taxonomy does not recognize T. f. bondi but includes it within T. f. personus. Some authors have suggested that bondi and personus represent one or two separate species. Clements recognizes some distinctions within the cocoa thrush, calling T. f. personas (with Bondi included) as the "cocoa thrush (Lesser Antillean)" and the other three subspecies as the "cocoa thrush (cocoa)" and "fumigatus group".

This article follows the five-subspecies model.

== Description ==
The cocoa thrush is 21.5 to 24 cm (8.5 to 9.4 in) long and weighs 55 to 83 g (1.9 to 2.9 oz). The sexes have the same plumage. Adults of the nominate subspecies T. f. fumigatus have a foxy-brown head, upperparts, wings, and tail. Their throat is whitish buff with dark streaks, their breast and flanks pale orange-brown, and their belly to vent whitish with brown feather tips on the latter. Juveniles resemble adults with the addition of buff streaks and spots on their upperparts, wing bars made of orangey spots, and dark brown mottling on buffy orange underparts.

All subspecies have a dark iris and brownish gray bill, legs, and feet. The other subspecies differ from the nominate and each other thus:

- T. f. aquilonalis: less rufous on upper- and underparts than nominate
- T. f. orinocensis: slightly darker upperparts and less white underparts than nominate
- T. f. bondi: less rufous upperparts than nominate and grayish brown underparts
- T. f. personus: buffish brown underparts

== Distribution and habitat ==
The subspecies of the cocoa thrush are found thus:

- T. f. aquilonalis: Trinidad; Serranía del Perijá on the Venezuela-Colombia border; western base of Venezuelan Andes in Táchira; east of Venezuelan Andes from Lara east to Sucre and Monagas
- T. f. orinocensis: eastern base of Venezuelan Andes from Barinas south and western Amazonas; west into central and eastern Colombia
- T. f. fumigatus: from Delta Amacuro and eastern Bolívar in Venezuela east through the Guianas and much of Amazonian Brazil; separately in southeastern Brazil between Alagoas and São Paulo states
- T. f. bondi: St. Vincent
- T. f. personus: Grenada

The southern and eastern edges of the species' range in Amazonian Brazil roughly follow a line from southern Rondônia east to southern Tocantins and then northeast to the Atlantic in Maranhão. In addition to the above, the SACC and eBird have records in Argentina. Some sources include eastern Bolivia in the range of T. f. fumigatus. The IOC does not and the South American Classification Committee (SACC) has no records in that country. BirdLife International places the species on many other islands in the Lesser Antilles in addition to St. Vincent and Grenada; no other source does so. (Note: "no other source" includes those cited in the article, the American Ornithological Society's Checklist of North American Birds, and eBird.)

The cocoa thrush inhabits a variety of landscapes, many of which are somewhat open. They include the interior, clearings, and edges of humid forest, somewhat open woodlands, and gallery forest. In many areas it shows a preference for areas near water such as swampy locales and várzea forest. It also regularly is found in parks, gardens, cultivated areas with trees, and cacao and shade coffee plantations. In Suriname it is found only in forest within savanna and in forest on coastal sand ridges. In coastal French Guiana it is found in mangroves and swamp forest. On Trinidad it favors cocoa plantations. In Colombia the species ranges in elevation up to 1,500 m (4,900 ft), in Venezuela north of the Orinoco River to 1,800 m (5,900 ft) and to 500 m (1,600 ft) south of it, and in Brazil to 1,000 m (3,300 ft). On Trinidad it reaches 1,000 m (3,300 ft).

== Behavior ==
=== Movement ===
The cocoa thrush is a year-round resident.

=== Feeding ===
The cocoa thrush feeds on fruit, larval and adult insects, and other invertebrates such as worms and millipedes. It takes fruit from trees and other diet items primarily on the ground.

=== Breeding ===
The cocoa thrush's breeding seasons vary geographically. On Trinidad it breeds year-round except for September, with much activity from February to July and the peak in May and June. Pairs have raised up to four broods in a season. On St. Vincent and Grenada it breeds mostly between November and June and in Suriname between December and February. Its season includes December in both Colombia and southeastern Brazil. The cocoa thrush's nest is a bulky cup made from plant material and mud with moss on the outside and a lining of rootlets. It is typically placed up to about 5 m (15 ft) above the ground in a tree or on a stump. The clutch is two to four eggs on Trinidad and mainland South America and one to three in the Antilles. The eggs are pale greenish blue with pale reddish brown markings. The incubation period is 12.5 to 13.5 days and fledging occurs 13 to 15 days after hatch.

=== Vocalization ===
The song of the cocoa thrush's nominate subspecies is "a long musical caroling with numerous slurred phrases, the whole gliding smoothly along within narrow ranges of pitches, pree-er, churry, churry, o-ee-e, lulu, o-E-er, cheer-er, we-e, wu-e, E-a-o-eeo, te-a, te-a, e-o-to-e, cheer-o, o-ee, urr, wu-EE-er, toe-ee-tu-tu, o-ee-o... and so on". That of T. f. orinocensis is "choppy, some phrases squeaky, and overall less musical". In Venezuela it sings mostly in the first half of the year. Its calls include "bak, [a] warning chat-shat-shat, [a] harsh kik-ik-ik-ik alarm" and as a territorial challenge outside the breeding season a "descending series of c. 6 melodious deww-eh notes.

== Status ==
The IUCN has assessed the cocoa thrush as being of Least Concern. It has a very large range; its population size is not known and is believed to be decreasing. No immediate threats have been identified. It is considered fairly common in Colombia, common on Trinidad, and fairly common on both islands in the Antilles. It is "frequent to uncommon" in Brazil. In Venezuela it is "uncommon to fairly common locally" north of the Orinoco River. It is "[l]ocal in gallery forest in [the] llanos and spotty in terra firme and várzea forests [south] of Orinoco [and] fairly numerous in [eastern] Bolívar".
