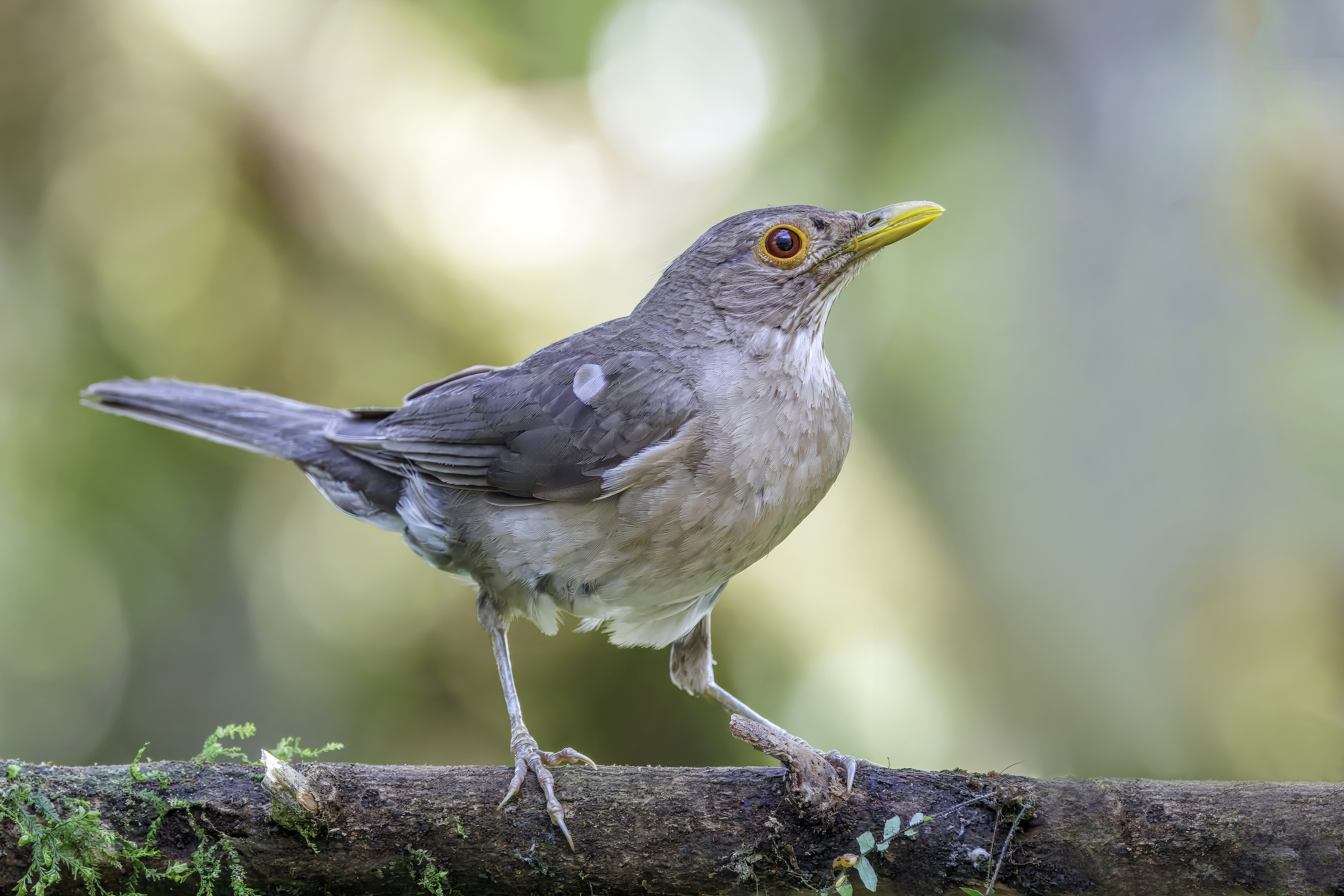

Conservation status
- Least Concern (IUCN 3.1)

Scientific classification
- Kingdom: Animalia
- Phylum: Chordata
- Class: Aves
- Order: Passeriformes
- Family: Turdidae
- Genus: Turdus
- Species: T. maculirostris

Binomial name
- Turdus maculirostris Berlepsch & Taczanowski, 1884

Synonyms
- See text

= Ecuadorian thrush =

Species of bird

The Ecuadorian thrush (Turdus maculirostris) is a species of bird in the family Turdidae. It is found in Ecuador and Peru.

== Taxonomy and systematics ==
The Ecuadorian thrush was originally described in 1884 as a subspecies of the black-billed thrush (Turdus ignobilis). It was later reassigned as a subspecies of the spectacled thrush (T. nudigenis) but in the early 2000s was recognized as a full species. The Ecuadorian thrush is monotypic.

== Description ==
The Ecuadorian thrush is 21.5 to 23 cm (8.5 to 9.1 in) long and weighs 62 to 76 g (2.2 to 2.7 oz). The sexes have the same plumage. Adults have an olive-brown head with a faint yellow eye-ring. Their upperparts, wings, and tail are olive-brown. Their throat is white with dark streaks. Their breast and flanks are a paler olive-brown than their upperparts and their belly and vent are whitish. They have a dark iris, a dusky yellow bill, and olive-brownish legs and feet. Juveniles have thin buff streaks on their upperparts, wing bars of orangey spots, and dark brown mottling on their breast and flanks.

== Distribution and habitat ==
The Ecuadorian thrush is found in western Ecuador from just south of the Colombian border south through the length of the country and into far northwestern Peru's Tumbes Department. In Ecuador it is found coastally and inland south to Santa Elena Province and beyond there into Peru only inland from the coast. In Ecuador it mostly ranges in elevation from sea level to 1,900 m (6,200 ft) and in Peru ranges between 400 and 750 m (1,300 and 2,500 ft). It inhabits a variety of somewhat open landscapes in the lowlands and subtropical zone. These include light forest and woodlands, clearings and edges of denser forest, and gardens near forest.

== Behavior ==
=== General ===
The Ecuadorian thrush is described as "rather shy".

=== Movement ===
The Ecuadorian thrush is a year-round resident.

=== Feeding ===
Little is known about the Ecuadorian thrush's diet or foraging behavior. It is known to forage mostly in trees.

=== Breeding ===
The Ecuadorian thrush's breeding season has not been fully defined but includes February. It builds a nest of plant fibers, mud, and moss on a stump, in a branch fork, or on a branch. Nests have been found between about 0.5 and 6 m (2 and 20 ft) above the ground. The only known clutch was of three eggs that were deep turquoise to dull greenish blue and spotted with red-brown. The incubation period, time to fledging, and details of parental care are not known.

=== Vocalization ===
The Ecuadorian thrush's song is "a musical caroling". Its principle call is "a distinctive cat-like and querulous queeoww" and it also makes a "chuk" call.

== Status ==
The IUCN has assessed the Ecuadorian thrush as being of Least Concern. Its population size is not known but is believed to be stable. No immediate threats have been identified. It is considered "the most numerous and widespread Turdus" in western Ecuador and is fairly common in its small Peruvian range.
