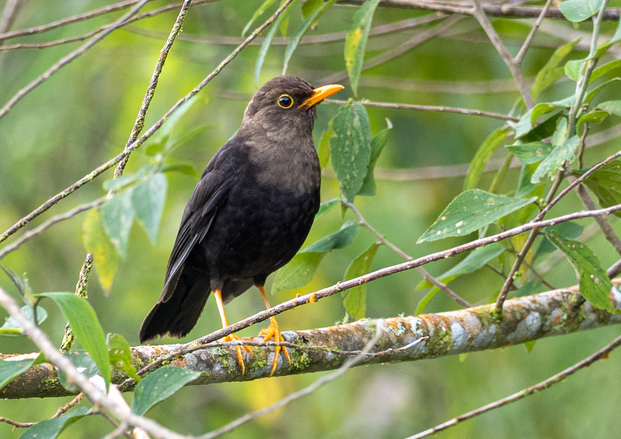
- Turdus nigrorum kelleri

Scientific classification
- Kingdom: Animalia
- Phylum: Chordata
- Class: Aves
- Order: Passeriformes
- Family: Turdidae
- Genus: Turdus
- Species: T. nigrorum

Binomial name
- Turdus nigrorum Ogilvie-Grant, 1896

= Mindanao island thrush =

Species of bird

The Mindanao island thrush (Turdus nigrorum), also known as the Negros island thrush, is a species of passerine in the family Turdidae. It is endemic to the Philippines found in the tropical moist montane forests of Negros and Mindanao. Prior to 2024, it was four separate subspecies of Island thrush, before the Island thrush was split into 17 species by the IOC and Clements checklist.

== Taxonomy ==
The Mindanao island thrush was formally described in 1896 by the Scottish ornithologist William Robert Ogilvie-Grant based on specimens found on the volcano of Kanlaon on the island of Negros in the Philippines. He coined the binomial name Turnus nigrorum. The Mindanao island thrush and its subspecies were formerly considered as subspecies of the island thrush (Turdus poliocephalus). Based on a molecular phylogenetic study published in 2023, the island thrush was split into 17 species, one of which was the Mindanao island thrush.

Four subspecies are recognized:

- Turdus nigrorum nigrorum Ogilvie-Grant, 1896 - Found on Negros island
- Turdus nigrorum malindangensis (Mearns, 1907) - Found around Mount Malindang; grayish brown head and chest and paler gray belly, flanks and vent and has white streaked brown undertail
- Turdus nigrorum katanglad Salomonsen, 1953 - Found around Mount Katanglad; grayish-brown hood, dark grayish-black upperparts and an uneven shaped band across lower breast, reddish brown flanks, white line going down the belly and vent and has white streaked brown undertail; also the smallest
- Turdus nigrorum kelleri (Mearns, 1905) - Found around Mount Apo; male is dark sooty brown with a pale gray-brown hood, female is similar but duller and less contrast; no whitish in vent

There are undescribed populations on Sarangani and Panay and believed to be part of this species. However, this species as a whole is highly likely to be further split as many of these birds exhibit many differences.

== Description ==
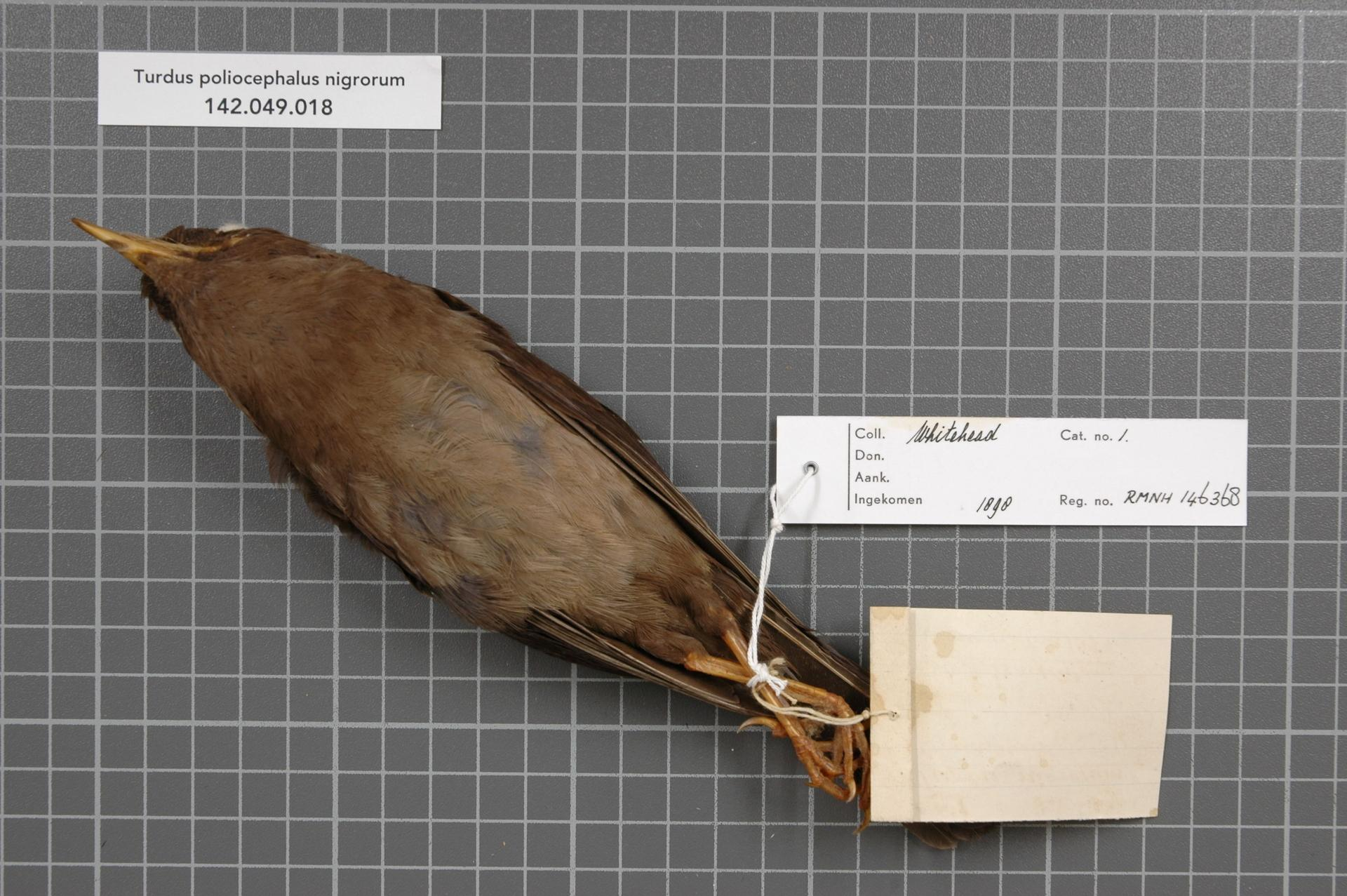
A specimen of the nigorum subspecies from the Naturalis Biodiversity Center

EBird describes this as "A dark thrush with a slightly paler head, and orange bill, eyering, legs, and feet. Found at high elevations in Mindanao and Negros in the Philippines, where it is more common than many of the former Island Thrush complex. Forages at all levels of forest, including on the forest floor. Calls include harsh chupping calls, often given in bursts."

== Behaviour and ecology ==
This is a newly split species and there are no specific studies yet for the Mindanao island thrush. The Island thrush species complex has a varied and generalist diet taking a range of invertebrates such as insects including beetles, spiders, snails, earthworms, as well as carrion and even small reptiles. It will also take fruit and seeds, depending on what is locally available. It is observed foraging on leaf litter and low branches in dense cover, clearings and even roads.

Breeding season is believed to be April to May but birds with enlarged gonads have been collected from February to October. The Island thrush species complex makes cup shaped nests of grass, roots, tendrils, twigs, bark and moss. These nests are typically placed low and close to a clearing. Clutch size is 1 to 3 eggs but is usually 2. Eggs are greenish blue with brown spots. Incubation takes 18 days and fledgling takes 17 to 19 days.

== Habitat and conservation status ==
It occurs in tropical moist montane forest and forest edges. The altittudes of its habitat vary per island. In Negros, it is seen from 1,500 to 1,800 meters above sea level; Mount Malindang; 1,360 to 1,800 meters above sea level and Mount Kitanglad; above 1,500 meters above sea level.

This is a newly split species and has yet to be assessed by the International Union for Conservation of Nature. This bird is believed to be common in its habitat. However, like all other forest species in the Philippines, its population is still likely on the decline. This montane specialist's mountain habitat has remained relatively intact compared to lowland forest. Despite this, encroachment from illegal logging, settlers and land conversion still occurs. Negros has been most affected by deforestation with just 4% forest cover by 1988.

It occurs in a few protected areas like Kanlaon, Mount Apo, Kitanglad Mountain Range, Mount Malindang and Mount Hamiguitan but actual protection from deforestation is still lax.
