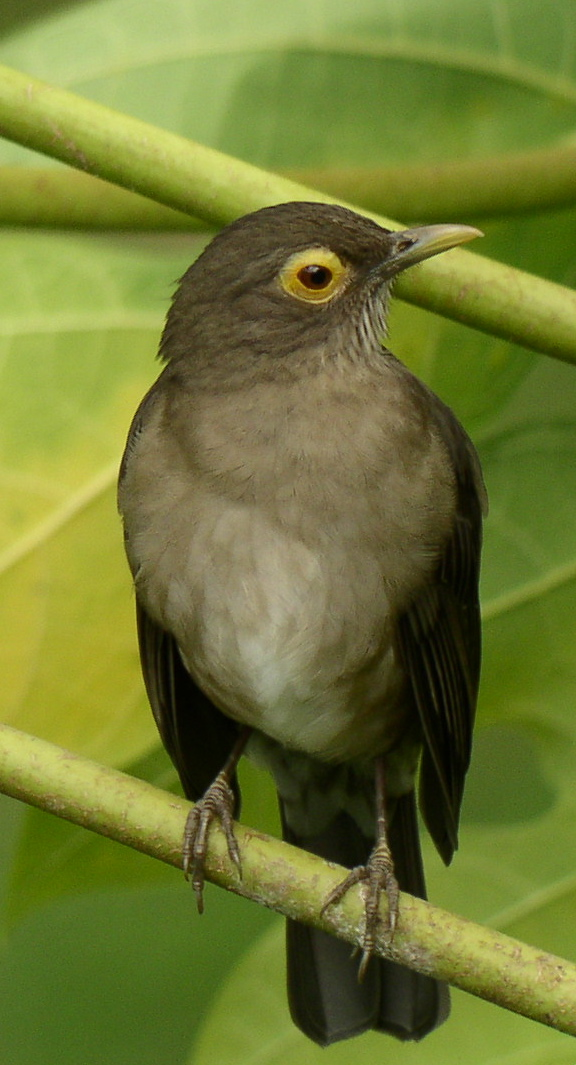
- Adult spectacled thrush in Tobago, showing eyering for which it is named

Conservation status
- Least Concern (IUCN 3.1)

Scientific classification
- Kingdom: Animalia
- Phylum: Chordata
- Class: Aves
- Order: Passeriformes
- Family: Turdidae
- Genus: Turdus
- Species: T. nudigenis

Binomial name
- Turdus nudigenis Lafresnaye, 1848

= Spectacled thrush =

Species of bird

The spectacled thrush, bare-eyed thrush, or yellow-eyed thrush (Turdus nudigenis), is a resident breeding bird in the Lesser Antilles and in South America from Colombia and Venezuela south and east to northern Brazil. In Trinidad and Tobago, this thrush is also known as big-eye grieve.

The similar but allopatric Ecuadorian thrush was formerly considered a subspecies of the bare-eyed thrush and named T. n. maculirostris; it is now normally considered as a separate species T. maculirostris. It has a narrower eyering and is only found in forest and woodland in western Ecuador and northwestern Peru.

== Description ==
The spectacled thrush is 23–24 cm (9.1–9.4 in) long and weighs 60 g (2.1 oz). It is plain olive-brown above and paler brown below. The throat is brown-streaked off-white, and the lower belly is whitish. It has a prominent yellow eye ring which gives rise to its English and scientific names.

There are two poorly defined subspecies, differing mainly in the darkness of the plumage. Sexes are similar, but young birds are flecked above and spotted below, and have a thinner eye ring.

The song is a musical warble, slower and lower pitched than that of the cocoa thrush (T. fumigatus), and it also produces a cat-like queeoow call and, when uncomfortable, emits a kereel.

== Ecology ==
The habitat of this large thrush is open woodland, forest clearings and cultivation. The bare-eyed thrush mainly feeds on or near the ground on fruit, berries and some insects and earthworms. It is a shy species, but on Trinidad and Tobago it is much tamer, and will come to feeders and take food from tables.

The nest is a lined bulky cup of twigs low in a tree. The two to three reddish-blotched deep-blue eggs are incubated by the female alone.
