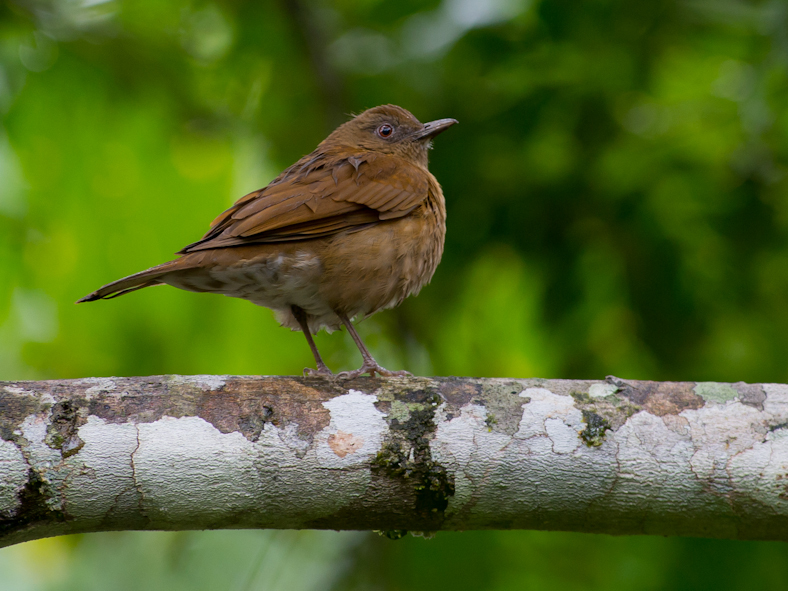

Conservation status
- Least Concern (IUCN 3.1)

Scientific classification
- Kingdom: Animalia
- Phylum: Chordata
- Class: Aves
- Order: Passeriformes
- Family: Turdidae
- Genus: Turdus
- Species: T. hauxwelli

Binomial name
- Turdus hauxwelli Lawrence, 1869

= Hauxwell's thrush =

Species of bird

Hauxwell's thrush (Turdus hauxwelli) is a species of bird in the family Turdidae. It is found in Bolivia, Brazil, Colombia, Ecuador, Peru, and possibly Venezuela.

== Taxonomy and systematics ==
Hauxwell's thrush was originally described in 1869 by George Newbold Lawrence with its current binomial Turdus hauxwelli. He wrote:

I have named this species in compliment to Mr. John Hauxwell, the well-known collector on the Upper Amazon and its tributaries.

Since then it has had a complicated taxonomic history. During the twentieth century it has been considered by different authors to be a subspecies of the cocoa thrush (T. fumigatus) or the pale-vented thrush (T. obsoletus). By late in the century it had regained its status as a full species. Genetic data published in the early 2000s show that Hauxwell's thrush and the cocoa thrush are sister species and that the pale-vented thrush is not closely related to either of them.

Hauxwell's thrush is monotypic.

== Description ==
Hauxwell's thrush is 20 to 23 cm (7.9 to 9.1 in) long and weighs about 69 g (2.4 oz). The sexes have the same plumage. Adults have a rufous-brown head with a dark-streaked whitish throat. Their upperparts, wings, and tail are rich rufous-brown with their rump being somewhat more rufous. Their breast is medium brown, their belly whitish, and their vent area whitish with brown feather tips. They have a dark iris, a brownish gray bill, and brownish gray legs and feet.

== Distribution and habitat ==
Hauxwell's thrush is a bird of the upper Amazon Basin. It is found from the eastern half of Colombia south through eastern Ecuador and eastern Peru into northern Bolivia. From there its range extends into western Brazil to an arc roughly defined by northern Amazonas, west-central Pará, and northern Mato Grosso do Sul. It possibly also occurs in far southwestern Venezuela but has not been confirmed there. The species inhabits humid forest, especially várzea and stands on river islands and riverbanks. It also occurs in terra firme forest. In elevation it reaches 500 m (1,600 ft) in Colombia, 300 m (1,000 ft) in Ecuador, 800 m (2,600 ft) but locally to 1,500 m (4,900 ft) in Peru, and 800 m (2,600 ft) in Brazil.

== Behavior ==
=== Movement ===
Hauxwell's thrush is a year-round resident.

=== Feeding ===
Hauxwell's thrush feeds on insects, other invertebrates, and fruit. It forages mostly in trees but also on the ground.

=== Breeding ===
Two nests of Hauxwell's thrush are known, both in Brazil. One found in March had two eggs and the other, found in August, had one egg. Both were in palms. The first was described as a fairly deep cup made from grass and mud lined with finer grasses. Its eggs were pale greenish blue with small reddish brown blotches on one end. Nothing else is known about the species' breeding biology.

=== Vocalization ===
The song of Hauxwell's thrush is described as "a leisurely series of simple but melodic phrases that can continue for protracted periods". It sometimes mimics the songs of other species. Its calls include "an ascending drreee? and a querulous upslurred kweeeow?".

== Status ==
The IUCN has assessed Hauxwell's thrush as being of Least Concern. It has a very large range; its population size is not known and is believed to be decreasing. No immediate threats have been identified. It is considered "local and furtive" in Colombia, "scarce" in Ecuador, "uncommon but widespread" in Peru, and "frequent to uncommon" in Brazil.
