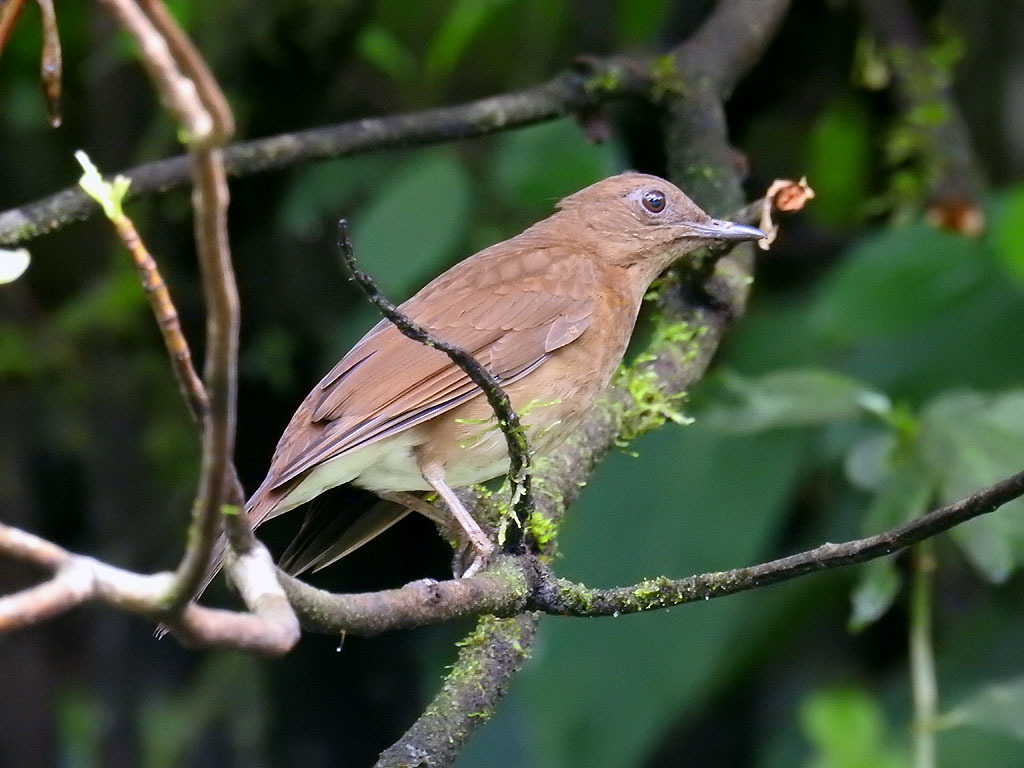

Conservation status
- Least Concern (IUCN 3.1)

Scientific classification
- Kingdom: Animalia
- Phylum: Chordata
- Class: Aves
- Order: Passeriformes
- Family: Turdidae
- Genus: Turdus
- Species: T. obsoletus

Binomial name
- Turdus obsoletus Lawrence, 1862

= Pale-vented thrush =

Species of bird

The pale-vented thrush (Turdus obsoletus) is a species of bird in the family Turdidae.

It is found in Colombia, Costa Rica, Ecuador, Panama, and Peru. Its natural habitats are subtropical or tropical moist lowland forests, subtropical or tropical moist montane forests, and heavily degraded former forest.

== Taxonomy and Systematics ==
The pale‑vented thrush is a species of songbird that belongs to the family Turdidae, genus Turdus.

This species is composed of three subspecies the first being Turdus obsoletus obsoletus which can be found in the Caribbean slope of Costa Rica, Panama, and northwestern Columbia. The second subspecies is the Turdus obsoletus parambanus found in west Columbia and west Ecuador. The last of the subspecies is the Turdus obsoletus colombianus found in the eastern slope of the western Andes in Columbia.

== Description ==
The upper parts of the birds' feathers are brown with the underparts being lighter with a white underside near the tail area and the underside of the wings are pale orange. Both the male and female appearances are similar. The height of the bird ranges from 5cm up to 23cm tall and weighs from 61g to 82g. The subspecies parambanus appearance has a slightly darker brown above area with mainly white belly. The second subspecies colombianus is paler with olive feathers on the breast and underside of the wings.

== General Habitat ==
The pale-vented thrush can be found in lower growth areas inside humid and wet foothills; they can also be found in lower subtropical forests. They often prefer areas that are clear with openings and in gallery forests but also have been spotted at the edges of forests. Outside of breeding season they might be spotted around pasture trees and lower second growth.

== Diet and Foraging ==
The Pale-vented thrush has a diet consisting of berries, invertebrates, and fruits from plants in the area they are found like from Lauraceae plants. They forage in trees and occasionally on the ground through leaf litter and will do this in groups with other bird species sometimes.

== Population ==
The number of adult pale-vented thrush as of 2019 ranges between 500,000 up to 4,999,999 with the population trends at this time showing the number of them as decreasing. With their population decreasing they are still classified as a part of the least concern according to the IUCN. They are more common in Central America, and more rare in Ecuador.
