= National Register of Historic Places listings in Wakulla County, Florida =

Location of Wakulla County in Florida

This is a list of the National Register of Historic Places listings in Wakulla County, Florida.

This is intended to be a complete list of the properties and districts on the National Register of Historic Places in Wakulla County, Florida, United States. The locations of National Register properties and districts for which the latitude and longitude coordinates are included below, may be seen in a map.

There are 11 properties and districts listed on the National Register in the county, including 1 National Historic Landmark.

This National Park Service list is complete through NPS recent listings posted March 20, 2026.

Contents: Counties in Florida (non-linked contain no National Register listings)
Alachua - Baker - Bay - Bradford - Brevard - Broward - Calhoun - Charlotte - Citrus - Clay - Collier - Columbia - DeSoto - Dixie - Duval - Escambia - Flagler - Franklin - Gadsden - Gilchrist - Glades - Gulf - Hamilton - Hardee - Hendry - Hernando - Highlands - Hillsborough (Tampa) - Holmes - Indian River - Jackson - Jefferson - Lafayette - Lake - Lee - Leon - Levy - Liberty - Madison - Manatee - Marion - Martin - Miami-Dade (Miami) - Monroe - Nassau - Okaloosa - Okeechobee - Orange - Osceola - Palm Beach - Pasco - Pinellas - Polk - Putnam - St. Johns - St. Lucie - Santa Rosa - Sarasota - Seminole - Sumter - Suwannee - Taylor - Union - Volusia - Wakulla - Walton - Washington

== Current listings ==
	Name on the Register	Image	Date listed	Location	City or town	Description
1	Bird Hammock		December 15, 1972 (#72000357)	Address Restricted	Wakulla Beach	
2	Bo Lynn's Grocery	Bo Lynn's Grocery	February 14, 2017 (#100000643)	850 Port Leon Dr. 30°09′19″N 84°12′13″W	St. Marks	
3	Mount Beasor Primitive Baptist Church	Mount Beasor Primitive Baptist Church	October 17, 2012 (#12000866)	120 Mount Beasor Rd. 30°05′31″N 84°30′57″W	Sopchoppy vicinity	
4	Fort San Marcos de Apalache	Fort San Marcos de Apalache	November 13, 1966 (#66000271)	18 miles south of Tallahassee; 30°09′18″N 84°12′40″W	St. Marks	
5	Old Sopchoppy High School Gymnasium	Old Sopchoppy High School Gymnasium	June 1, 1990 (#90000849)	Junction of Second Avenue and Summer Street; 30°03′29″N 84°29′34″W	Sopchoppy	
6	Old Wakulla County Courthouse	Old Wakulla County Courthouse	May 3, 1976 (#76000607)	Church Street; 30°10′30″N 84°22′35″W	Crawfordville	
7	Panacea Mineral Springs	Panacea Mineral Springs	November 10, 2022 (#100008423)	1505 Coastal Hwy; 30°02′04″N 84°23′23″W	Panacea	
8	St. Marks Lighthouse	St. Marks Lighthouse	July 31, 1972 (#72000356)	Northern side of Apalache Bay at the terminus of State Road 59; 30°04′24″N 84°10′45″W	St. Marks National Wildlife Refuge	
9	Sopchoppy Depot	Sopchoppy Depot	October 12, 2017 (#100001738)	34 Rose St. 30°03′40″N 84°29′28″W	Sopchoppy	
10	Sopchoppy School	Sopchoppy School	October 12, 2001 (#01001088)	164 Yellow Jacket Avenue; 30°03′28″N 84°29′42″W	Sopchoppy	
11	Wakulla Springs Archeological and Historic District	Wakulla Springs Archeological and Historic District	January 25, 1993 (#92001760)	1 Spring Drive; 30°13′58″N 84°17′32″W	Wakulla Springs	

== See also ==
- List of National Historic Landmarks in Florida
- National Register of Historic Places listings in Florida
