= Mount Beasor Primitive Baptist Church =

Historic church in Florida, United States

Coordinates: 30.091794°N 84.515877°W

- U.S. National Register of Historic Places
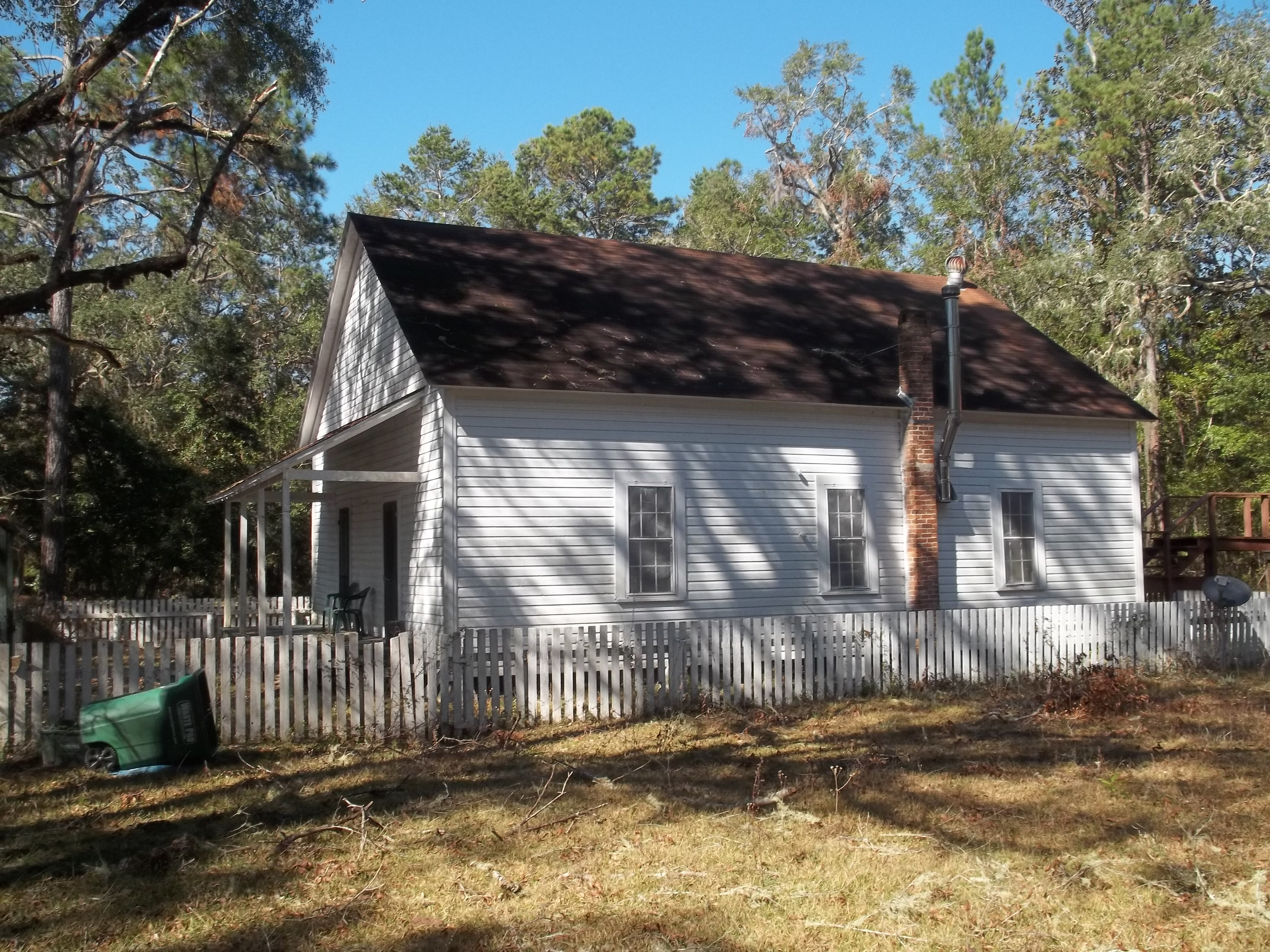

- Location within Florida Location within the United States
- Location: 120 Mount Beasor Rd., Sopchoppy, Florida vicinity
- NRHP reference No.: 12000866
- Added to NRHP: October 17, 2012

Mount Beasor Primitive Baptist Church is a historic church in Wakulla County, Florida. It was added to the National Register of Historic Places on October 17, 2012. The church's address is 120 Mount Beasor Road and it is located in the vicinity of Sopchoppy. The church was established in 1853.

== See also ==
- National Register of Historic Places listings in Wakulla County, Florida
