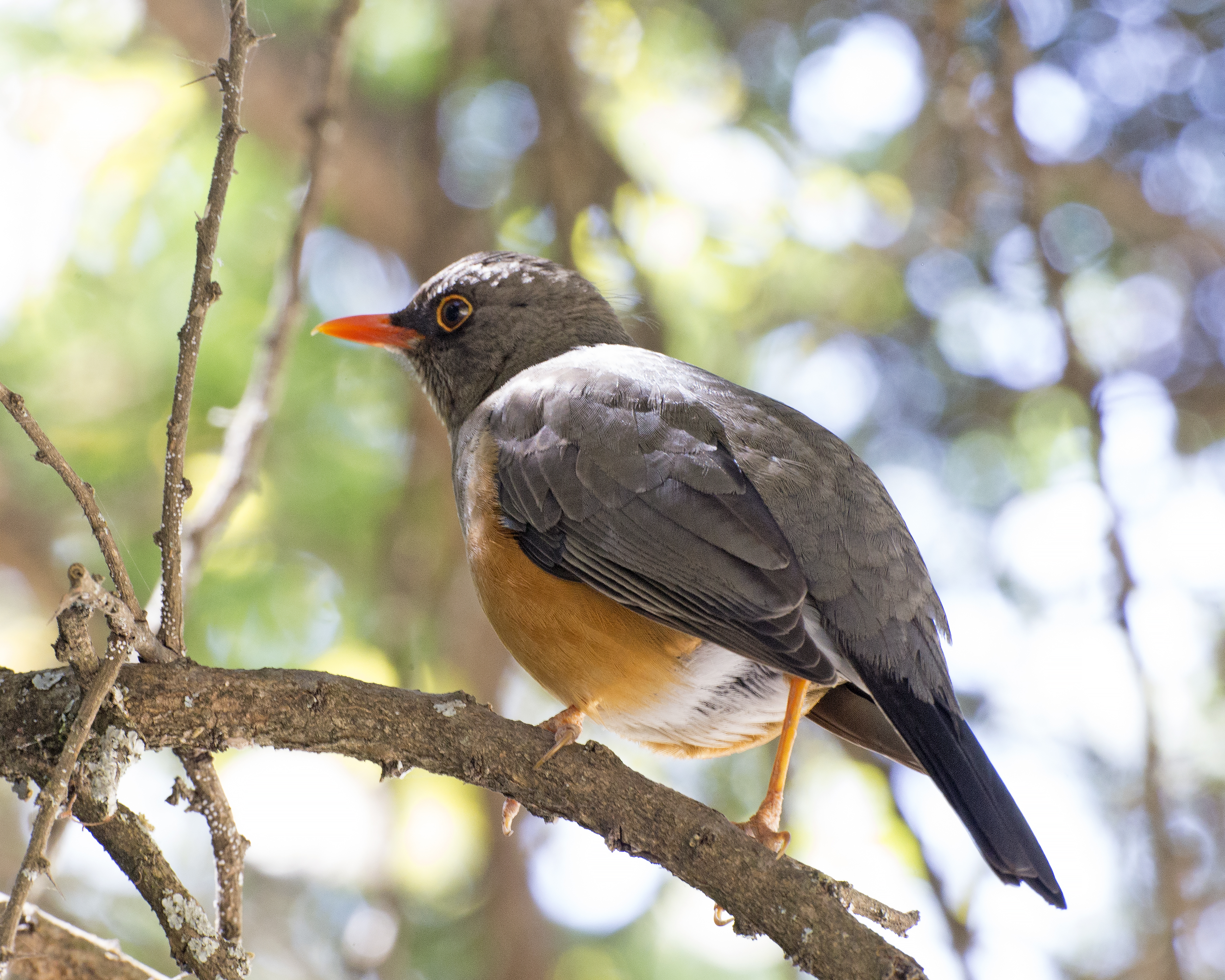

Conservation status
- Least Concern (IUCN 3.1)

Scientific classification
- Kingdom: Animalia
- Phylum: Chordata
- Class: Aves
- Order: Passeriformes
- Family: Turdidae
- Genus: Turdus
- Species: T. abyssinicus

Binomial name
- Turdus abyssinicus J. F. Gmelin, 1789

Synonyms
- Turdus olivaceus abyssinicus

Audio

= Abyssinian thrush =

Species of bird

The Abyssinian thrush (Turdus abyssinicus) is a passerine bird in the family Turdidae. It is also known as the African mountain thrush, or northern olive thrush The species was formerly treated as conspecific with the olive thrush (Turdus olivaceus) but the species were split based on the genetic differences. The ranges do not overlap. The Abyssinian thrush is native to the eastern Afromontane.

== Taxonomy ==
The Abyssinian thrush was formally described in 1789 by the German naturalist Johann Friedrich Gmelin in his revised and expanded edition of Carl Linnaeus's Systema Naturae. He placed it with the thrushes in the genus Turdus and coined the binomial name Turdus abyssinicus. Gmelin based his description on "Merle brun d'Abissinie" that had been described in 1775 by the French polymath Georges-Louis Leclerc, Comte de Buffon in his multi-volume work Histoire Naturelle des Oiseaux.

The Abyssinian thrush was formerly usually considered to be conspecific with the olive thrush (Turdus olivaceus). The species were split based on the results of a molecular phylogenetic study published in 2005 that compared mitochondrial DNA sequences.

Six subspecies are recognised:

- Turdus abyssinicus abyssinicus Gmelin, JF, 1789 – Eritrea and Ethiopia to north, west, central Kenya, extreme north Tanzania, north Uganda and Sudan
- Turdus abyssinicus deckeni Cabanis, 1868 – north to northeast Tanzania
- Turdus abyssinicus oldeani Sclater, WL & Moreau, 1935 – central north Tanzania
- Turdus abyssinicus bambusicola Neumann, 1908 – east DR Congo to southwest Uganda and northwest Tanzania
- Turdus abyssinicus baraka (Sharpe, 1903) – Virunga Volcanoes (east DR Congo) and southwest Uganda
- Turdus abyssinicus nyikae Reichenow, 1904 – east, south Tanzania, north Malawi and northeast Zambia

== Description ==
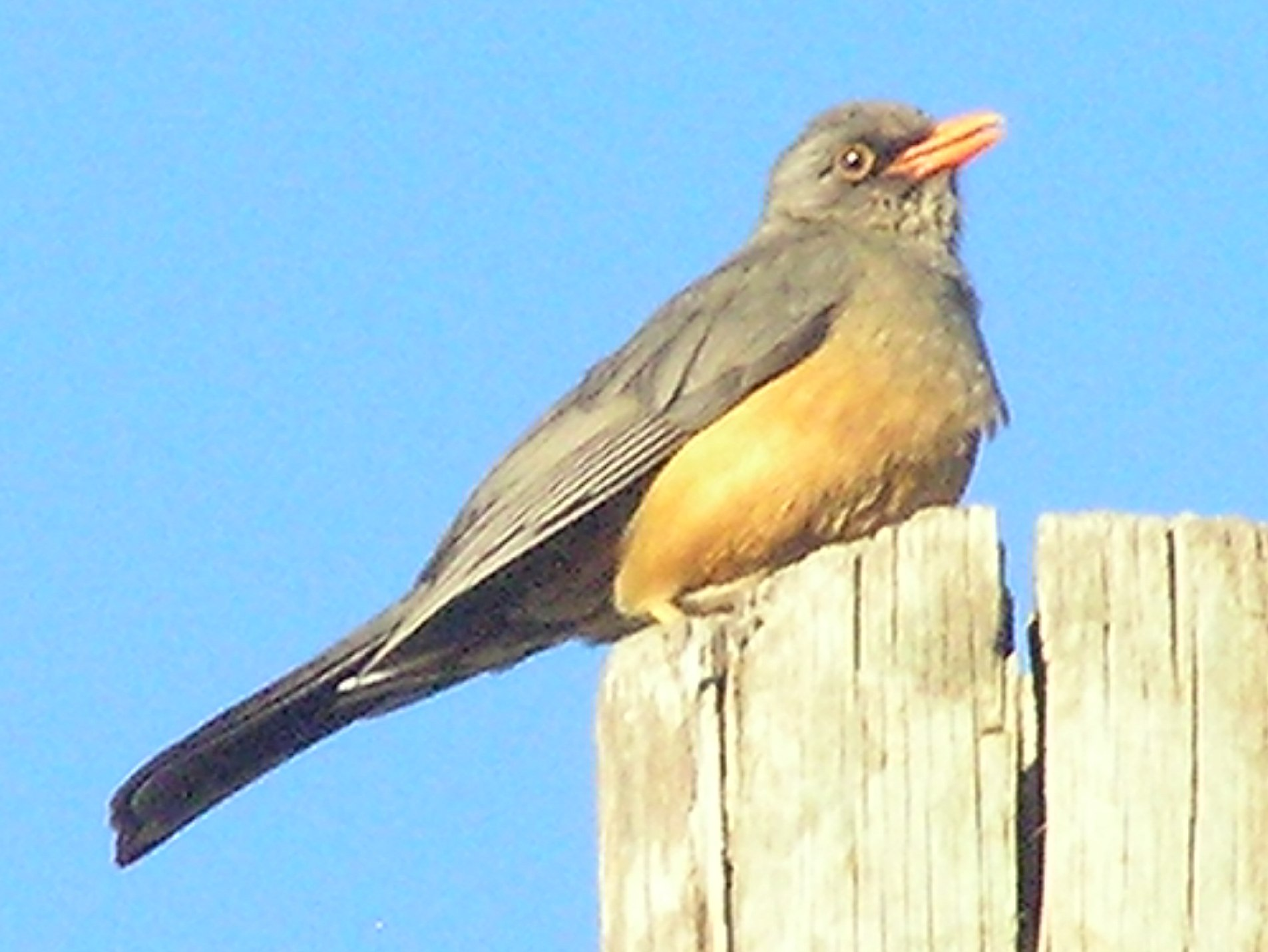
In Debre Berhan, Ethiopia

It is 22 centimetres (8.7 in) long. This variable forest thrush is generally darker than the African thrush and has an orange (not yellow) bill. It is also darker than the Kurrichane thrush and has no malar stripes. Generally the birds get darker at higher altitudes.

== Distribution, habitat and habits ==
The Abyssinian thrush occurs in the highlands of eastern Africa from South Sudan south to northern Mozambique.

Its habitat includes forests woodlands, exotic plantations, parks and gardens.

This species is a typical member of the genus Turdus but its habits and biology have been little studied, as it was considered to be a subspecies of olive thrush.

== Works cited ==
- Sinclair, Ian; Ryan, Peter (2003). Birds of Africa south of the Sahara. Cape Town: Struik.
