= Sopchoppy School =

- U.S. National Register of Historic Places
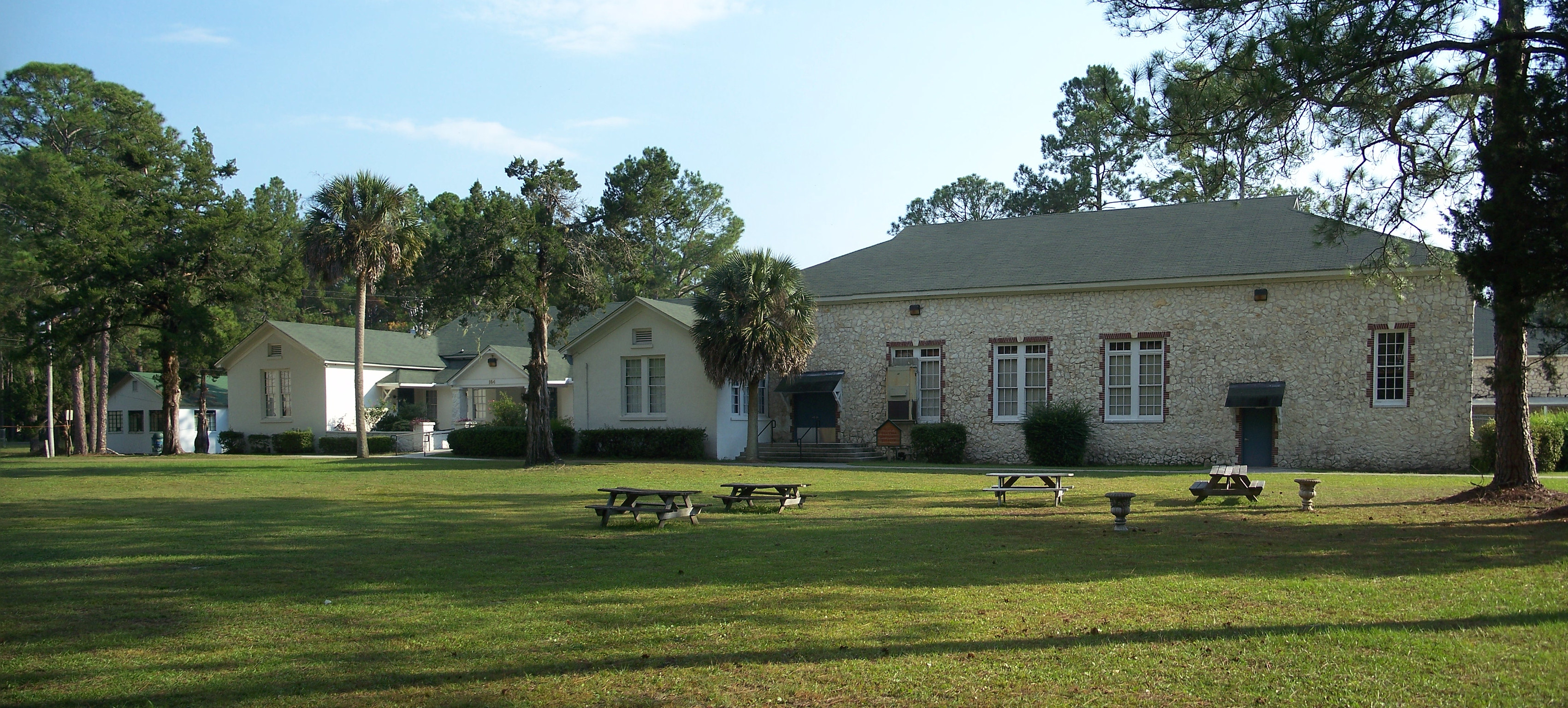

- Location within Florida Location within the United States
- Location: Sopchoppy, Florida
- Coordinates: 30°3′28″N 84°29′42″W
- Built: 1924
- NRHP reference No.: 01001088
- Added to NRHP: October 12, 2001

The Sopchoppy School (also known as Sopchoppy High School) is a historic site in Sopchoppy, Florida, located at 164 Yellow Jacket Avenue. On October 12, 2001, it was added to the U.S. National Register of Historic Places.

== Gallery ==
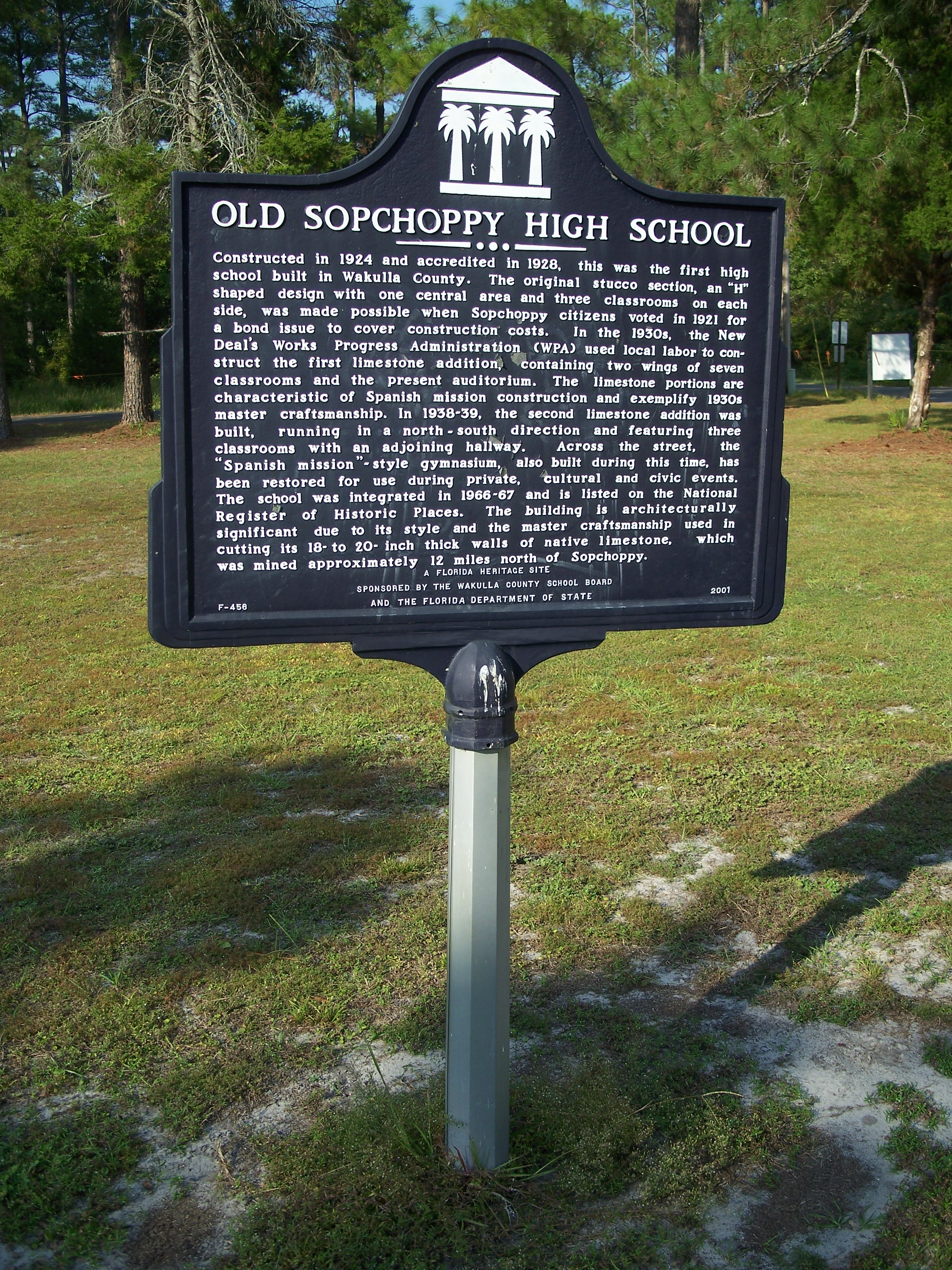

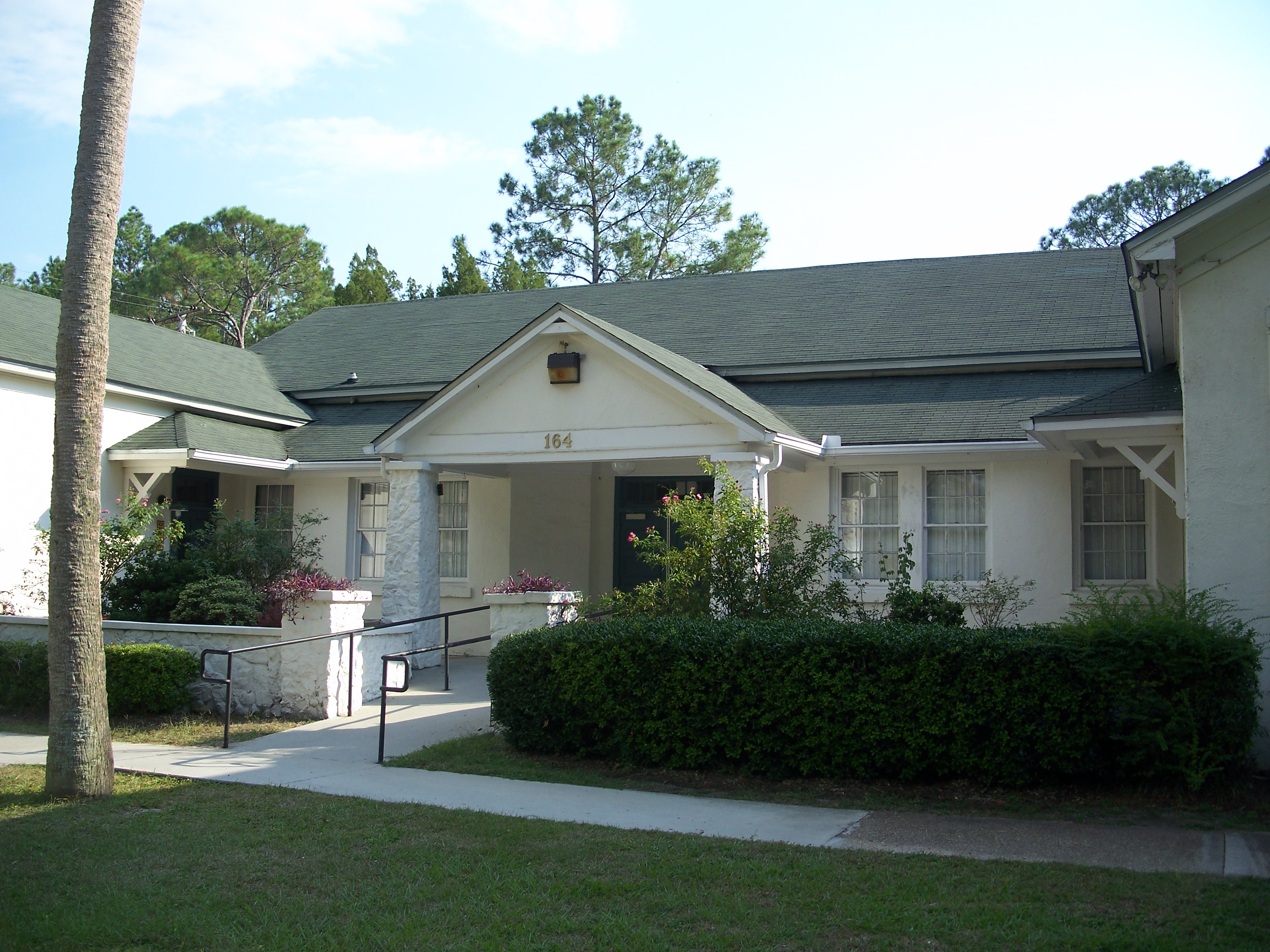

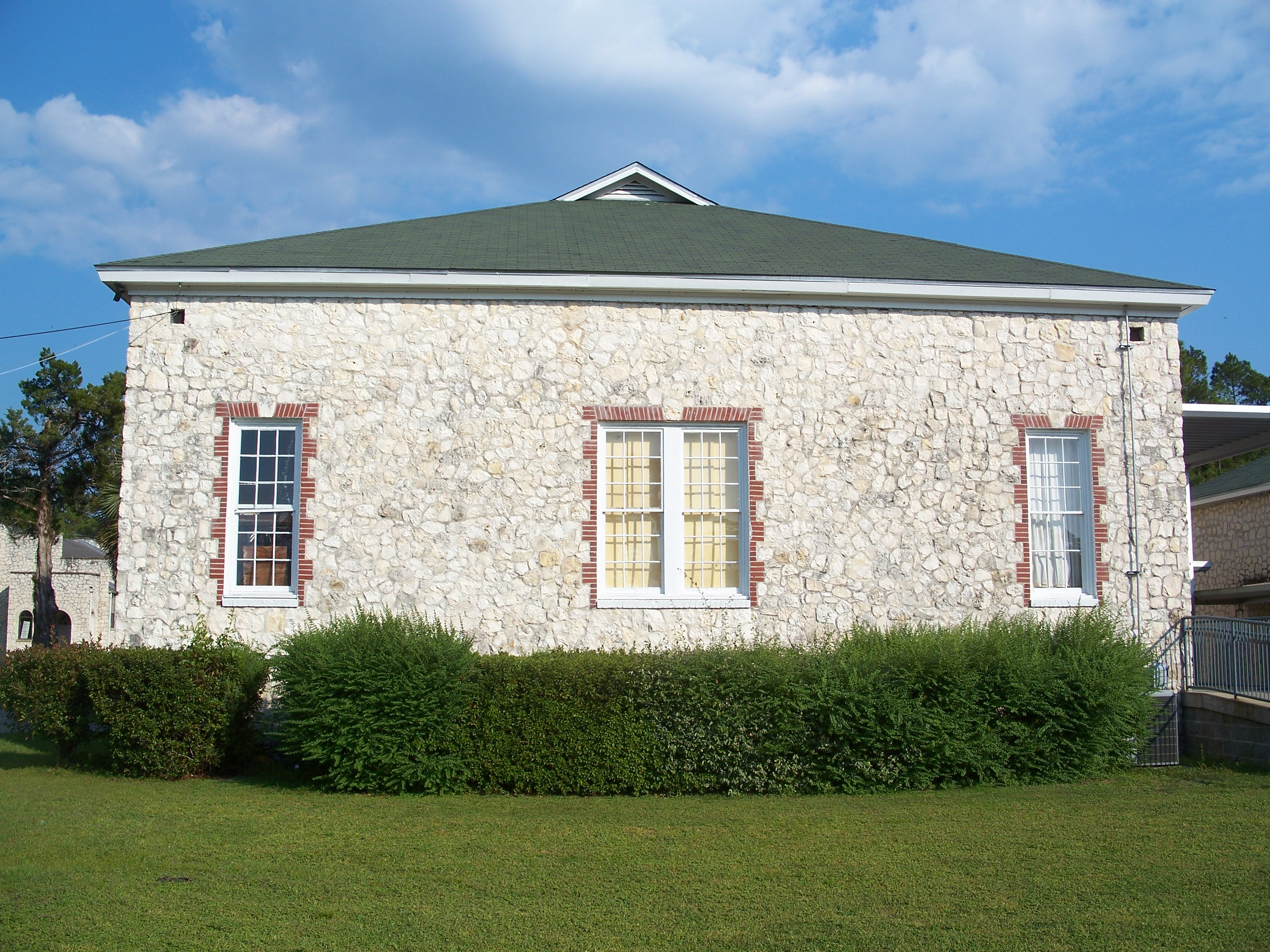

=== Old Sopchoppy High School Marker, Sopchoppy, Fl. ===
The text on the marker reads as: " Constructed in 1924 and accredited in 1928, this was the first high school built in Wakulla County. The original stucco section, an "H" shaped design with one central area and three classrooms on each side, was made possible when Sopchoppy citizens voted in 1921 for a bond issue to cover construction costs. In the 1930s, the New Deal's Works Progress Administration (WPA) used local labor to construct the first limestone addition, containing two wings of seven classrooms and the present auditorium. The limestone portions are characteristic of Spanish mission construction and exemplify1930s master craftsmanship. In 1938-39, the second limestone addition was built, running in a north-south direction and featuring three classrooms with an adjoining hallway. Across the street, the "Spanish mission"-style gymnasium, also built during this time, has been restored for use during private, cultural and civic events. The school was integrated in 1966-67 and is listed on the National Register of Historic Places. The building is architecturally significant due to its style and the master craftsmanship used in cutting its 18- to 20-inch thick walls of native limestone, which was mined approximately 12 miles north of Sopchoppy." National Register of Historic Places NRIS #01001088 Sponsors: WAKULLA COUNTY SCHOOL BOARD AND THE FLORIDA DEPARTMENT OF STATE Latitude, Longitude 30.05835278, -84.49332500 Source:Old Sopchoppy High School Marker, Sopchoppy, FL George Lansing Taylor Jr., University of North Florida Creation Date 11-27-2009
