= Worm charming =

Methods of attracting earthworms

Two people worm grunting to collect bait in the Apalachicola National Forest. The worms respond to vibrations created by rubbing the top of a wooden stake with a flat piece of metal.

Worm charming, worm grunting, worm fiddling, or rooping is a method of attracting earthworms from the ground. The activity is usually performed to collect bait for fishing, but it can also take the form of a competitive sport in areas such as the UK and East Texas. As a skill and profession, worm charming is now very rare, with the art being passed down through generations to ensure its survival.

== Methods ==
Most worm charming methods involve vibrating the soil, which encourages the worms to come to the surface. In 2008, researchers from Vanderbilt University claimed that the worms surface because the vibrations are similar to those produced by digging moles, which prey on earthworms.

The activity is known by several different names, and the apparatus and techniques vary significantly. "Worm grunting" generally refers to the use of a "stob", a wooden stake that is driven into the ground, and a "rooping iron", which is used to rub the stob. "Worm fiddling" also uses a wooden stake, but utilises a dulled saw dragged along its top.

Techniques vary from sprinkling the turf with water, tea, or beer to playing music or simply "twanging" the ground with a garden fork. In some organized competitions, detergents and mechanical diggers have been banned.

== Non-human animal behavior ==
Worm charming is also observed in non-human animals, especially among birds such as the Northern lapwing, red-billed gull, kagu, American woodcock, and olive thrush. The methods used vary; however, tapping the ground with the feet to generate vibrations is widespread. One common example is the "seagull dance". The wood turtle also seems to be adapted for worm charming, as it is known to stamp its feet.

== Soil conditions ==
Worms are most commonly found in damp or wet conditions and tend to move away from dry soil. The success of worm charming often depends on these soil conditions, with charmers choosing damp locations or using water to attract the worms.

== As a profession ==
Worms are sold as live bait for fishermen, and many sellers use worm charming techniques to gather their stock. In some locations, professional worm grunters need to obtain a permit to ply their trade.

== Competitive worm charming ==
In most competitions, the fiddlers and the collector (or collectors) who gather the most worms in a set time are declared the winners. They usually have a zone in which to perform their charming, measuring three yards square.

=== World Worm Charming Championship ===
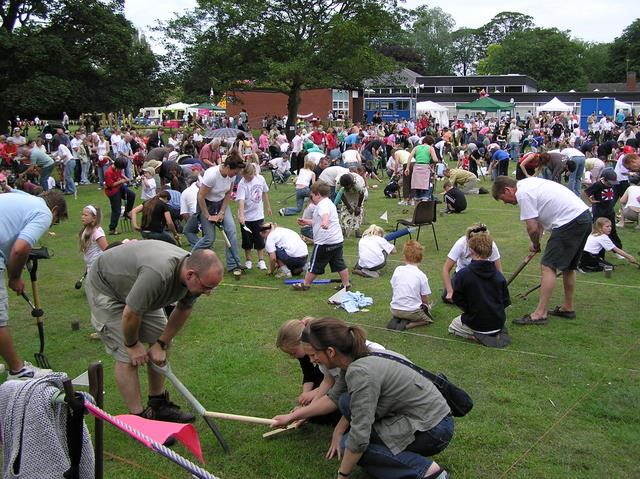
Competitive worm charming at Willaston in 2006

One of the first worm charming events took place at an English school fête at Willaston County Primary School in Willaston, Cheshire. The World Worm Charming Championships started in 1980 and is now an annual event, held in June. It was organised by then-deputy headmaster John Bailey, who wrote the original rules for the competition. The event claims to have originated when, in 1980, a local Willaston farmer's son, Tom Shufflebotham, charmed 511 worms in half an hour.

The current world record was established on 29 June 2009 by 10-year-old Sophie Smith of Willaston, England, who raised 567 worms during Britain's World Worm Charming Championship.

There are 18 rules for this event, as determined by the International Federation of Charming Worms and Allied Pastimes (IFCWAP). These stipulate that each competitor operates within a 3 × 3 metre plot, may use only vibrations or music to attract worms, and is not allowed to dig or use "drugs" to attract worms (including water or other liquids). Competitors may stick a garden fork into the ground and vibrate it to encourage worms, and all worms must be returned to the ground once the birds have gone to roost on the evening of the event. This is intended to prevent a "feast" for the birds after the event.

The competition returned in 2022, after missing 2020 (although a virtual event was held that year) and 2021 due to the COVID-19 pandemic.

Winners of World Worm Charming Championship
Year	Series	Champion	No. of worms	Charmer of heaviest worm	Heaviest worm (g)	Notes
2005	26th	Mike Gaukroger, Clare Gaukroger (1)	214	James and Andrew Thorley	4.5	
2006	27th	Geoff Sandburg, Davina Sandburg	127	Jordan and Darren Long	4.3	
2007	28th	Mike Gaukroger, Clare Gaukroger (2)	399			
2008	29th	Mike Gaukroger, Clare Gaukroger (3)	125	Ray O'Grady and Steve Plant	4.6	
2009	30th	Sophie Smith	567			World record for number of worms charmed.
2010	31st	Jamie Long, Darren Long	43	James Butler	5.1	
2011	32nd	Dave Ashman, Sam Ashman	265	Amy and Nick Sproston	12.08	The event's heaviest worm ever, weighing 12.08 grams (0.43 ounces).
2012	33rd	The Caravan Club (1)	419	Carol Owen	5.62	
2013	34th	Ellie-Jay Morris, Steve Palmer	303	Harry Price	6.5	
2014	35th	The Bowden family	394	Liam and Patrick Martin	5.84	
2015	36th	The Caravan Club (2)	227	Alana Healy	4.23	
2016	37th	Hope Smith	272	Luke and Ashton Caldwell	4.79	
2017	38th	The Love-Rouse family	137	Baldwin/Viggars	5.54	
2018	39th	James Martin, Sam Bromley	11	Five groups tied	3.0	
2019	40th	Sam Dobson, Ollie Dobson	64	Daniel Summers and Tyler, Jake, Charlie, William, and Elliot	8.0	
2020	41st	The Brookshaw family	155			Held virtually due to COVID-19. Plot size was 2 × 2 metres.
2021	Cancelled (COVID-19)					
2022	42nd	The Price family	83	The Macpherson family	8.0	
2023	43rd	The Jones and Weaver families	48			
2024	44th	Alex Godfrey	195			
2025	45th	The Thomasson family	71			

=== Devon Worm Charming Festival ===
Also known as the International Festival of Worm Charming, this event takes place in the small village of Blackawton, South Devon, during the early May Bank Holiday. It has been running since 1984 and is accompanied by a Real Ale Beer Festival and other activities. The genesis of the event occurred in 1983, when Dave Kelland, after returning home from drinking at The Normandy Arms, relieved himself in a field and was surprised to see worms come to the surface, giving him the inspiration for the competition. The event has been held at The Normandy Arms ever since. Unlike the World Worm Charming Championships in Cheshire, "forking" the ground is not allowed, but the use of water is.

=== Cornwall Worm Charming Championship ===
A new worm charming championship was established in 2021 by local artist Georgia Gendall, with the inaugural competition held in Penryn. It then moved to Falmouth as it grew in popularity. It is now known as the Falmouth Worm Charming Championship. The event in 2022 demonstrated the effects of climatic conditions on worm charming, with a heat wave leading to only a single worm being charmed. In 2024, the winning team was the Tennessee Worm Tuggers, who charmed 32 worms.

=== Canadian Worm Charming Championship and Festival ===
The Great Canadian Worm Charming Championship and Festival was held at Shelburne Fiddle Park in Shelburne, Ontario, on 9 June 2012.

=== American Worm Gruntin' Festival ===
The town of Sopchoppy, Florida, has held an annual "Worm Gruntin' Festival" since 2000. The event includes a ball and the crowning of a "Worm Gruntin' King and Queen". Sopchoppy is one of the settings in the 2017 novel Clownfish Blues by Tim Dorsey, in which worm grunting is a plot element.

== See also ==
- Snake charming
