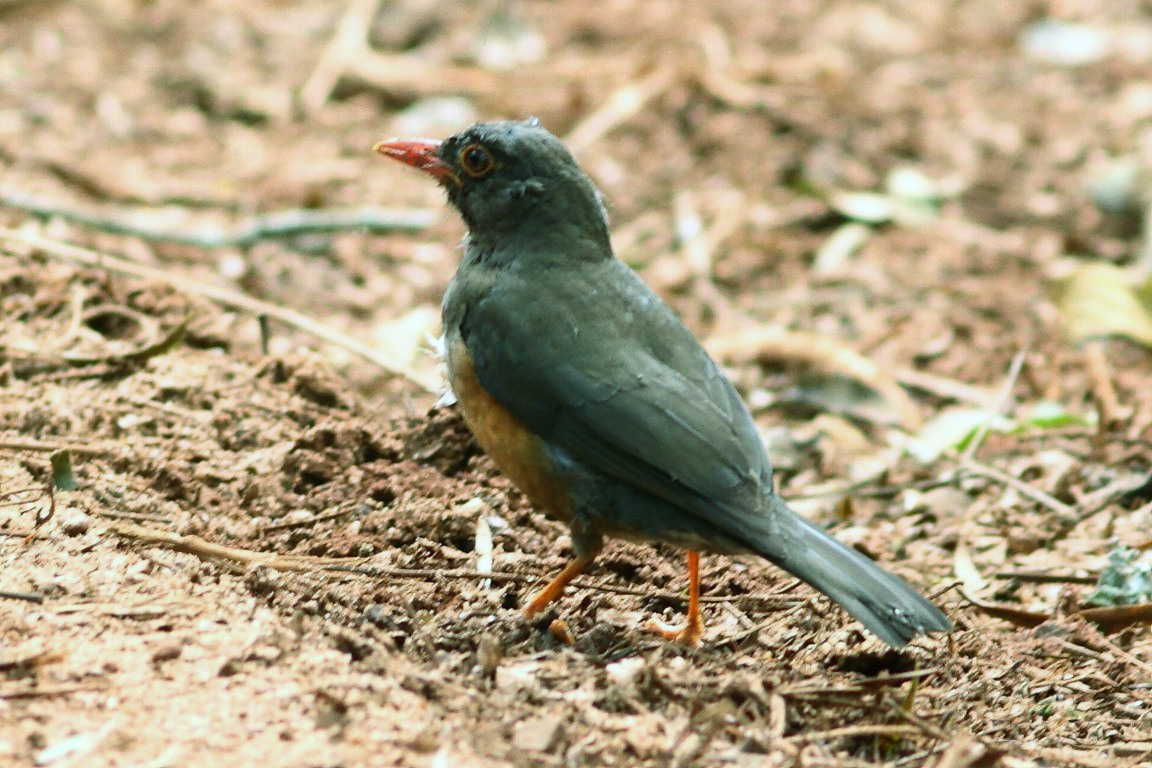

Conservation status
- Near Threatened (IUCN 3.1)

Scientific classification
- Kingdom: Animalia
- Phylum: Chordata
- Class: Aves
- Order: Passeriformes
- Family: Turdidae
- Genus: Turdus
- Species: T. roehli

Binomial name
- Turdus roehli Reichenow, 1905

Synonyms
- Turdus olivaceus roehli; Turdus olivaceus uluguru; Turdus abyssinicus roehli

= Usambara thrush =

Species of bird

The Usambara thrush (Turdus roehli), also known as Roehl's thrush or Usambara olive thrush, is a species of thrush found in eastern Africa. Formerly, it was considered as a subspecies of the olive thrush, with which it is known to hybridize with, but is now recognised as a separate species.

== Description ==
This medium-sized bird has a length of about 24 cm. It has a wing length between 117 and 131 mm, a culmen length between 20 and 24 mm and a tarsus length between 30,0 and 34,5 mm. It can reach a mass of at least 86 g. It occurs in the Pare and Usambara mountains of north-central Tanzania.
