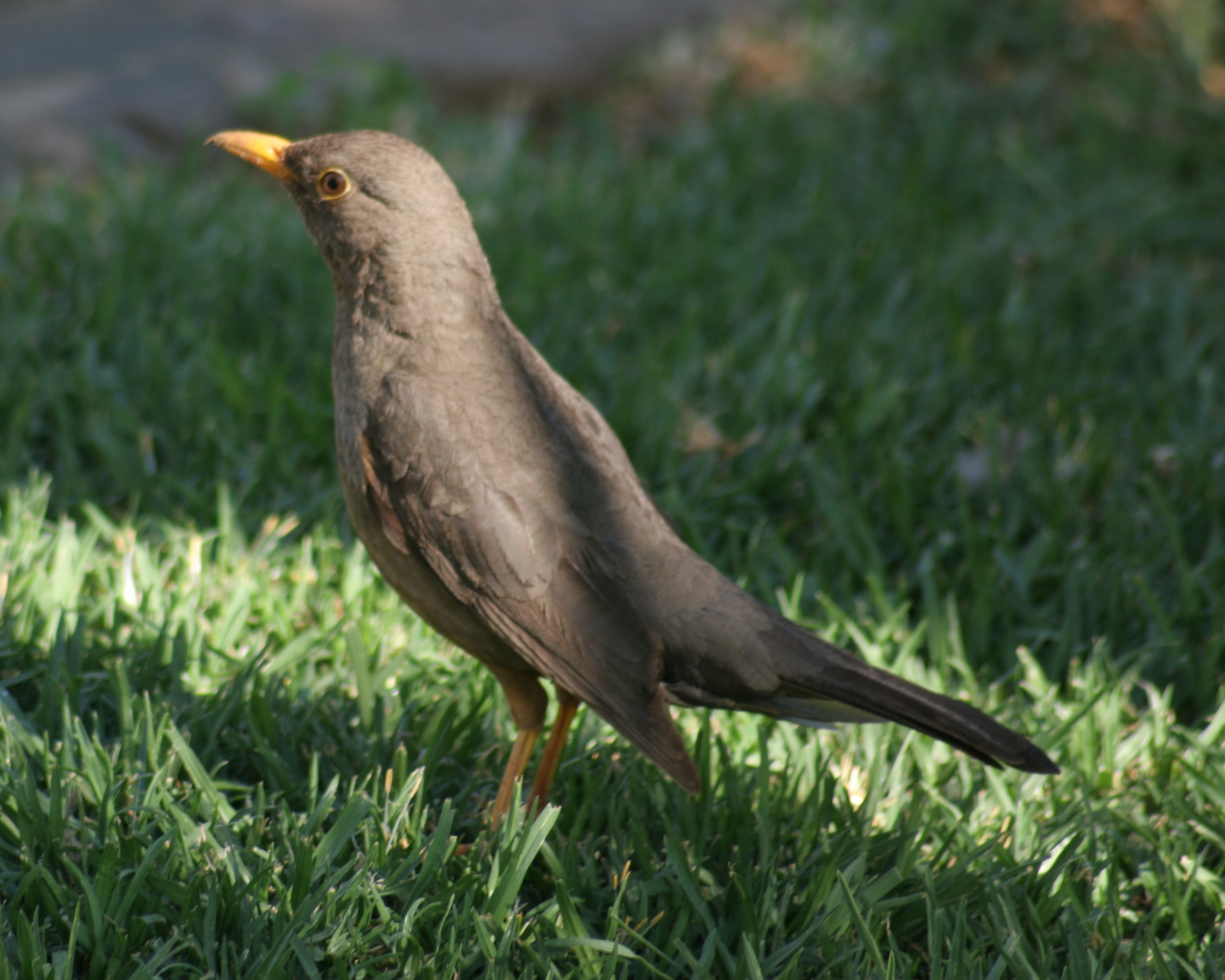
- Adult

Conservation status
- Least Concern (IUCN 3.1)

Scientific classification
- Kingdom: Animalia
- Phylum: Chordata
- Class: Aves
- Order: Passeriformes
- Family: Turdidae
- Genus: Turdus
- Species: T. smithi

Binomial name
- Turdus smithi Bonaparte, 1850

Audio
- Song

= Karoo thrush =

Species of bird

The Karoo thrush (Turdus smithi), also known as Smith's thrush, is a member of the thrush family in Africa. It has traditionally been considered a subspecies of the olive thrush (with which it is known to hybridize), but is increasingly treated as a separate species. The specific name honours the Scottish military surgeon and zoologist Sir Andrew Smith.

== Description ==
This medium-sized bird has a length of about 24 cm. It has a wing length between 117 and 131 mm, a culmen length between 20 and 24 mm and a tarsus length between 30.0 and 34.5 mm. It can reach a mass of at least 86 g. It differs from the olive thrush by its longer, entirely yellow bill, its longer wings, and its greyer flanks.

== Range ==
It occurs in South Africa, where it is present in Little Namaqualand, the Karoo and Northern Cape, Free State, Gauteng, Limpopo, Mpumalanga and parts of the North West Province.

== Gallery ==
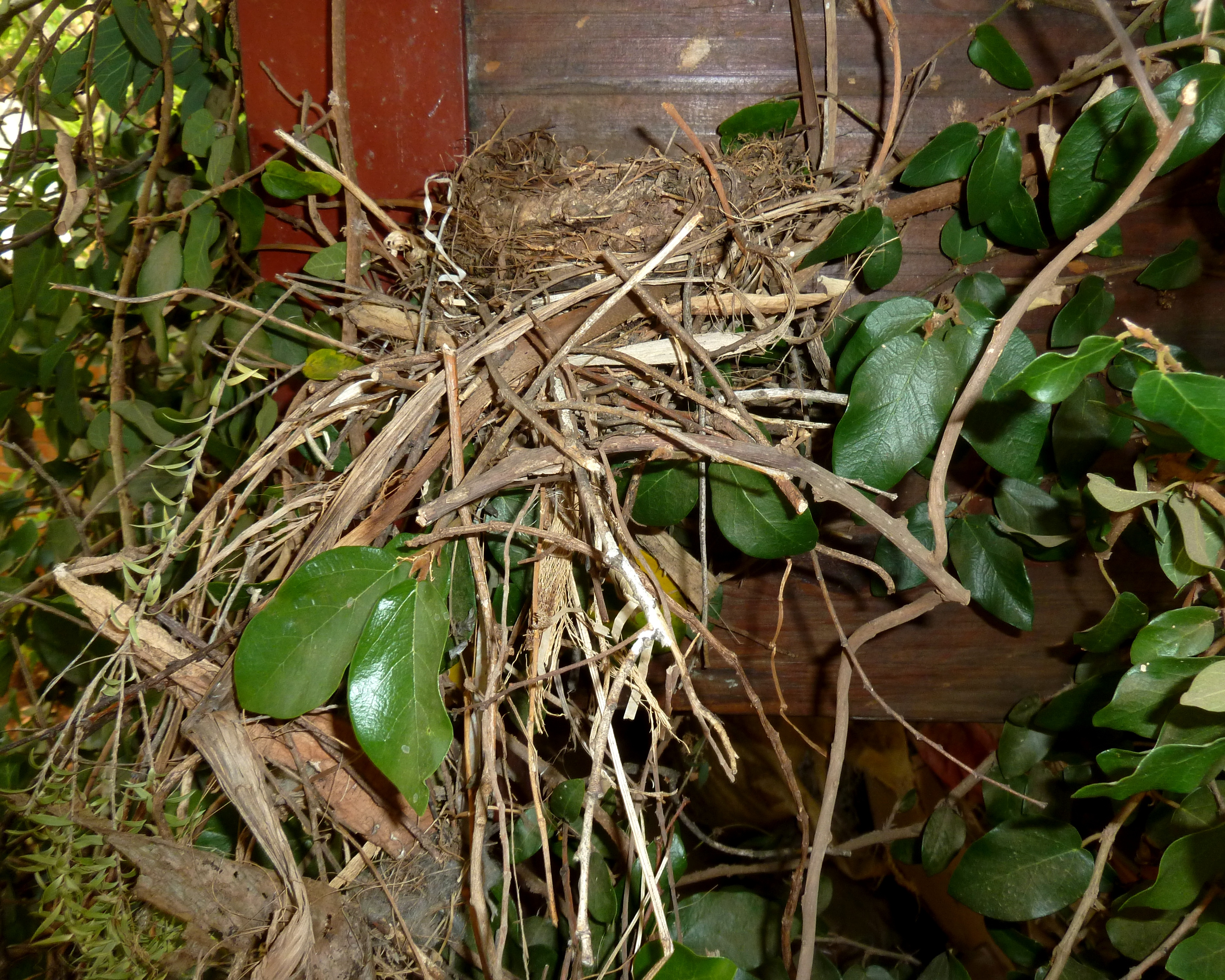
A nest

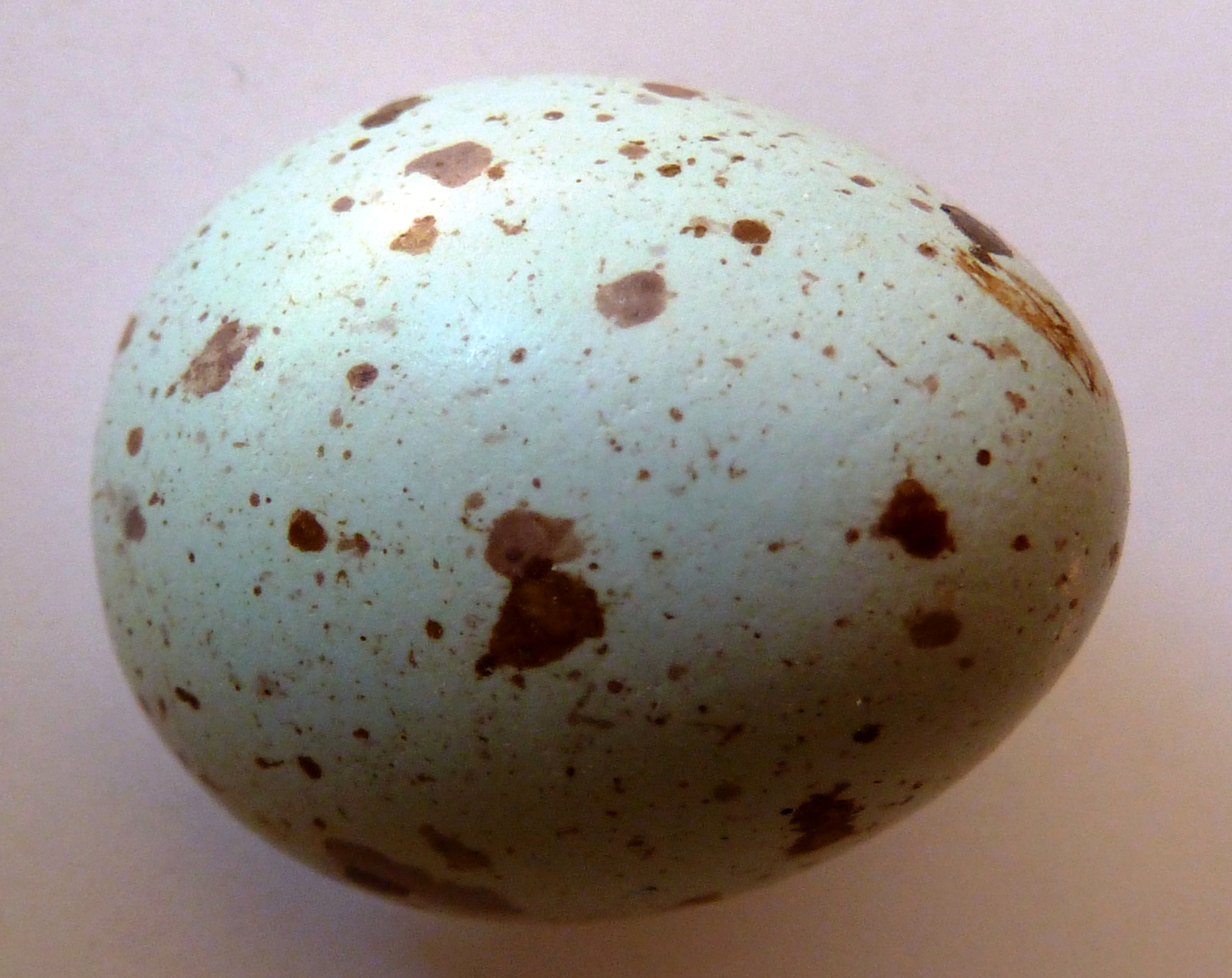
Egg

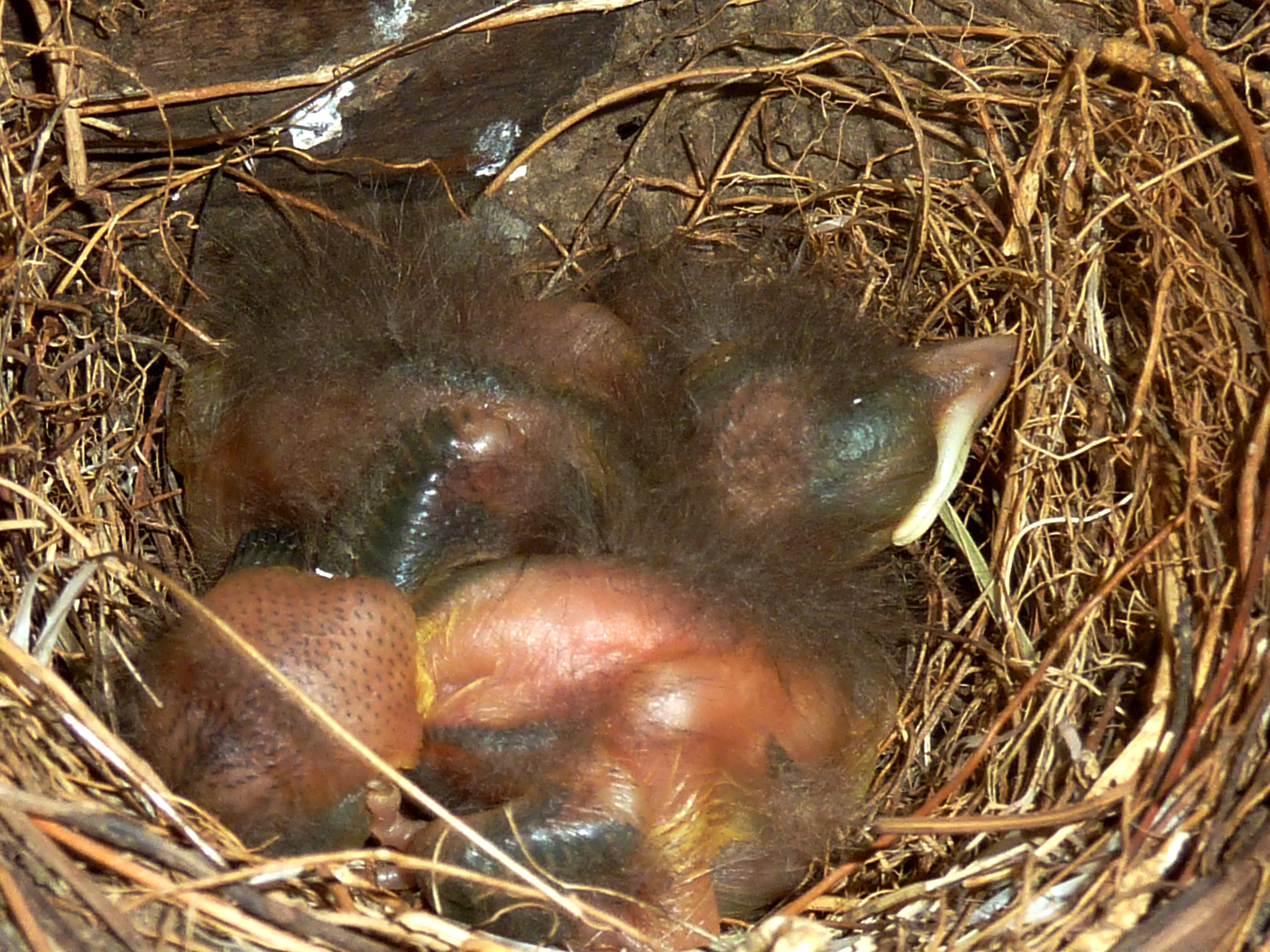
Two chicks

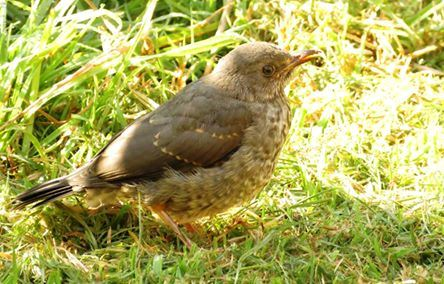
Juvenile

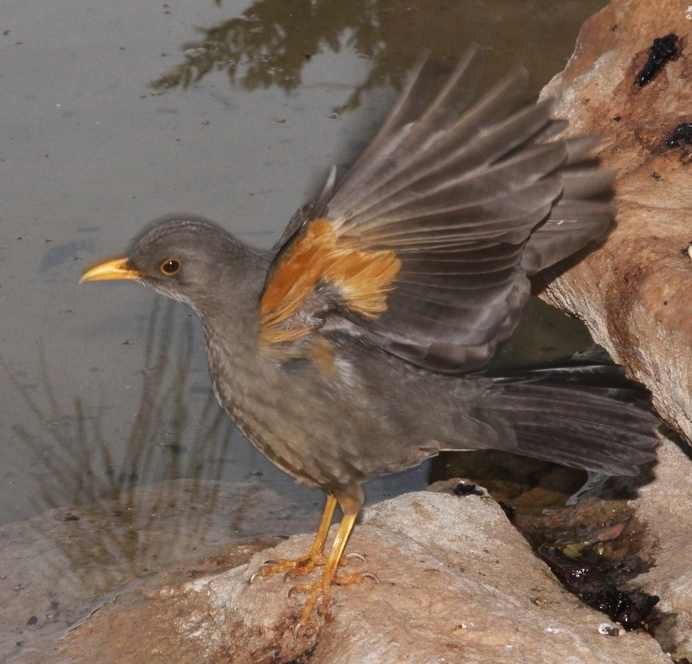
Adult showing grey flank (yellow in olive thrush)
