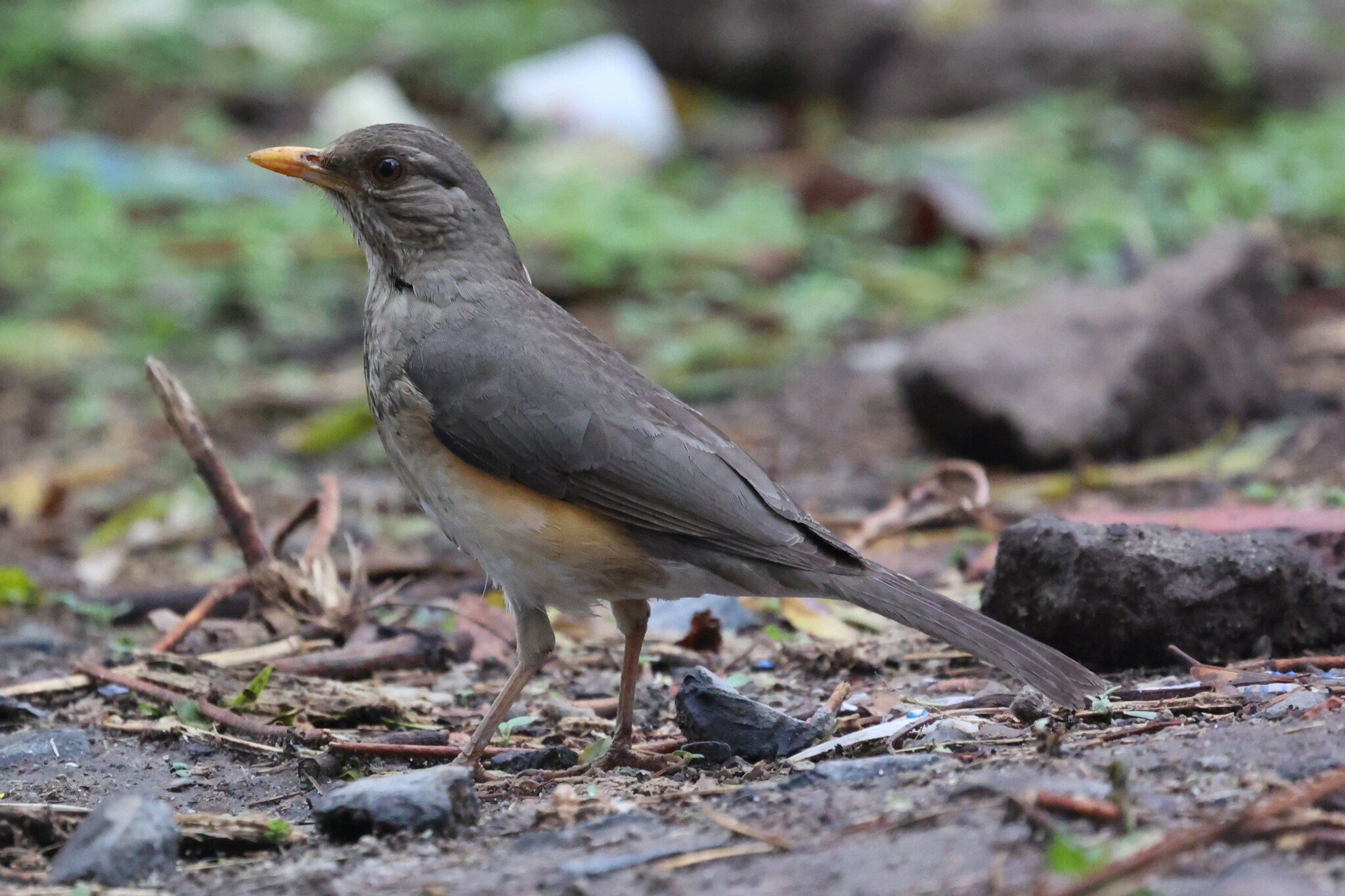

Conservation status
- Least Concern (IUCN 3.1)

Scientific classification
- Kingdom: Animalia
- Phylum: Chordata
- Class: Aves
- Order: Passeriformes
- Family: Turdidae
- Genus: Turdus
- Species: T. pelios

Binomial name
- Turdus pelios Bonaparte, 1850

Audio
- Song recorded near Kitale, Kenya

= African thrush =

Species of bird

The African thrush or West African thrush (Turdus pelios) is a passerine bird in the thrush family Turdidae. It is common in well-wooded areas over much of the western part of sub-Saharan Africa, it was once considered to be conspecific with the olive thrush but that species has now been split further. Populations are resident (non-migratory).

== Description ==
The African Thrush has dark olive-grey upperparts. The underparts show a whitish evenly brown- streaked side throat, the breast is greyish brown and the flanks are pale buff-orange with this colour not extending on to the lower breast, the belly and vent are white. It has a yellow-orange bill. It weighs 46–78 g (1.6–2.8 oz) and measures 21–23 cm (8.3–9.1 in) in length.

=== Voice ===
The song of the African thrush is a sustained, clear warbling made up of different phrases repeated rather randomly in a sequence. Also a high-pitched squealing flight call.

== Distribution ==
The African thrush is distributed from Senegal and Gambia in the west to South Sudan, Uganda, Ethiopia and Eritrea south to northwestern Zambia and western Angola.

== Habitat ==
The African thrush can be found in all sorts of wooded habitats including forest edge, riparian woodland, scrub cultivation, parks and gardens.

== Habits ==
The African thrush is normally encountered either singly or in pairs and is shy and retiring, preferring to remain in cover, but will come out and gather at fruiting trees. Usually forages in the ground, flicking leaf litter and searching through vegetation. Where undisturbed or habituated to people will feed out in the open in a similar fashion to the song thrush in Europe, and it is also reported to crack open snails on an anvil stone like a song thrush. Foraging is crepuscular and fruit, especially that of the nim Azadarichta indica, as well as figs, papaya, berries and seeds, makes up most of the diet supplemented with invertebrates and the occasional small fish.

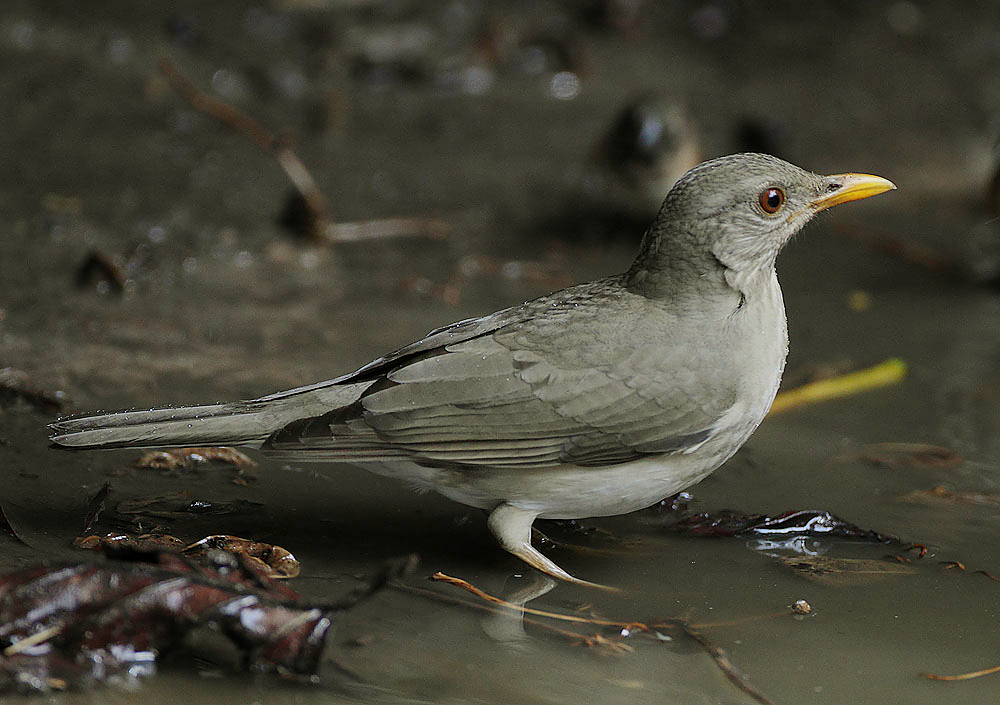
African Thrush

Breeding is recorded in all months, but breeding activity peaks in the wet season, which is March to September or October in West Africa, April–July in Ethiopia and November to March in the rest of its range. The nest is cup shaped and bulky and is constructed using plant fibres and mud lined with fine grasses, leaves and roots. This nest is placed on a horizontal branch, in a tree fork or among vines, usually at a height lower than 10 m from the ground. It may re-use the abandoned nest of another species. The female is responsible for incubating the normal clutch of 2–3 eggs; both sexes feed the young. It is double brooded.

== Taxonomy ==
The African thrush may be part of a superspecies with the Kurrichane thrush and the bare-eyed thrush, and some subspecies of African thrush (T.p. poensis, T.p.nigrilorum, T.p. centralis and T.p. chinguanicoides) have been considered subspecies of olive thrush.

The currently recognised subspecies and their distributions are:

- Turdus pelios chiguancoides Seebohm, 1881: Senegal east to northern Ghana.
- Turdus pelios saturatus (Cabanis, 1882): west Ghana east to central Cameroon, western Congo and Gabon.
- Turdus pelios nigrilorum Reichenow, 1892: Mount Cameroon.
- Turdus pelios poensis Alexander, 1903: Bioko (formerly Fernando Póo).
- Turdus pelios pelios Bonaparte, 1850: eastern Cameroon east to South Sudan, western Eritrea and western, central and eastern Ethiopia.
- Turdus pelios centralis Reichenow, 1905: eastern Congo and southern Central African Republic east to southern Ethiopia, western Kenya and north-western Tanzania.
- Turdus pelios bocagei (Cabanis, 1882): western Democratic Republic of Congo and north-western and western Angola.
- Turdus pelios graueri Neumann, 1908: eastern Democratic Republic of Congo, Burundi, Rwanda and western Tanzania.
- Turdus pelios stormsi Hartlaub, 1886: south-eastern Democratic Republic of Congo, eastern Angola and northern Zambia.
