= Old Sopchoppy High School Gymnasium =

- U.S. National Register of Historic Places
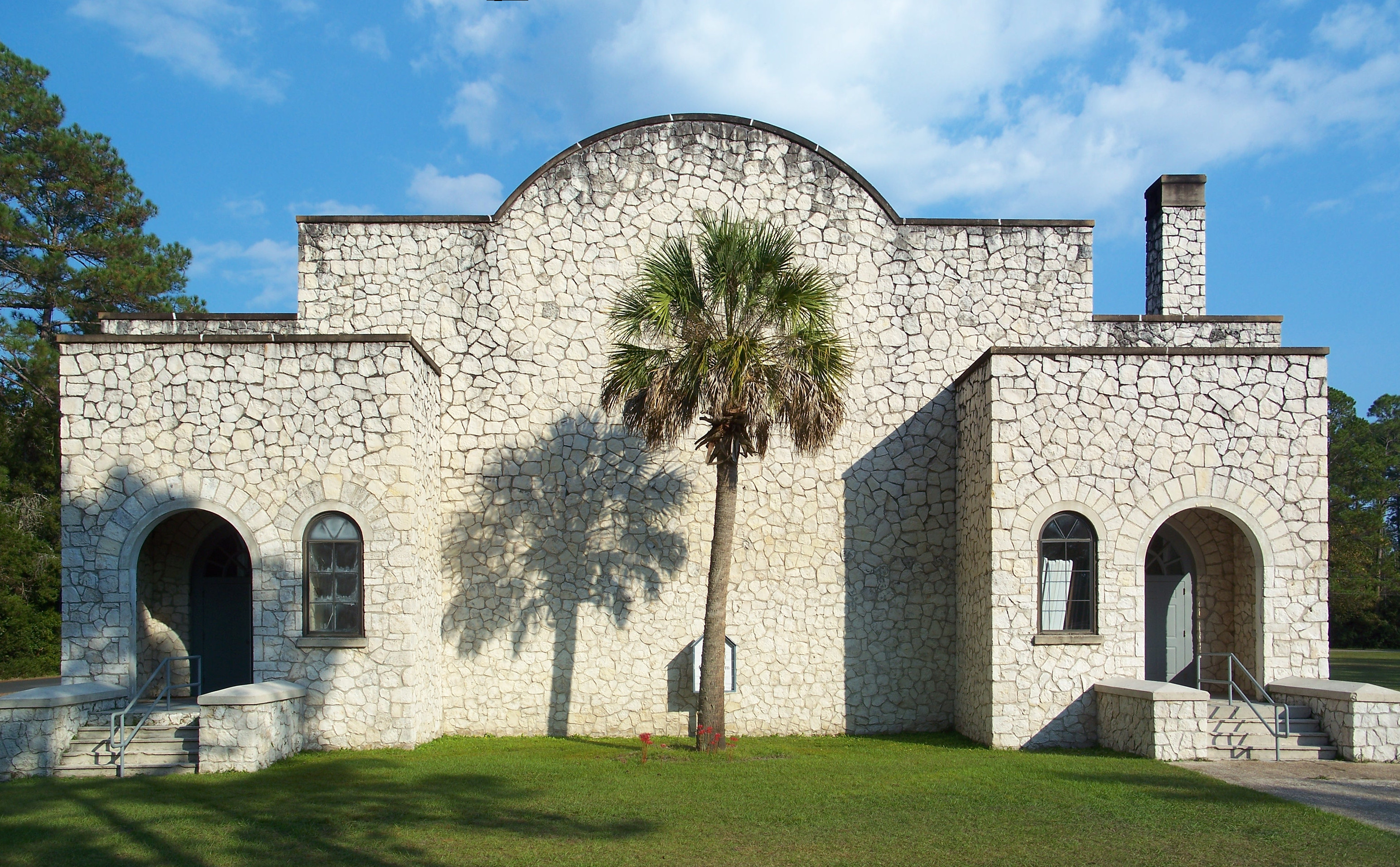

- Location within Florida Location within the United States
- Location: Sopchoppy, Florida
- Coordinates: 30°3′29″N 84°29′34″W
- NRHP reference No.: 90000849
- Added to NRHP: June 1, 1990

The Old Sopchoppy High School Gymnasium is a historic site in Sopchoppy, Florida, located at the junction of 2nd Avenue and Summer Street. On June 1, 1990, it was added to the U.S. National Register of Historic Places.

== Gallery ==
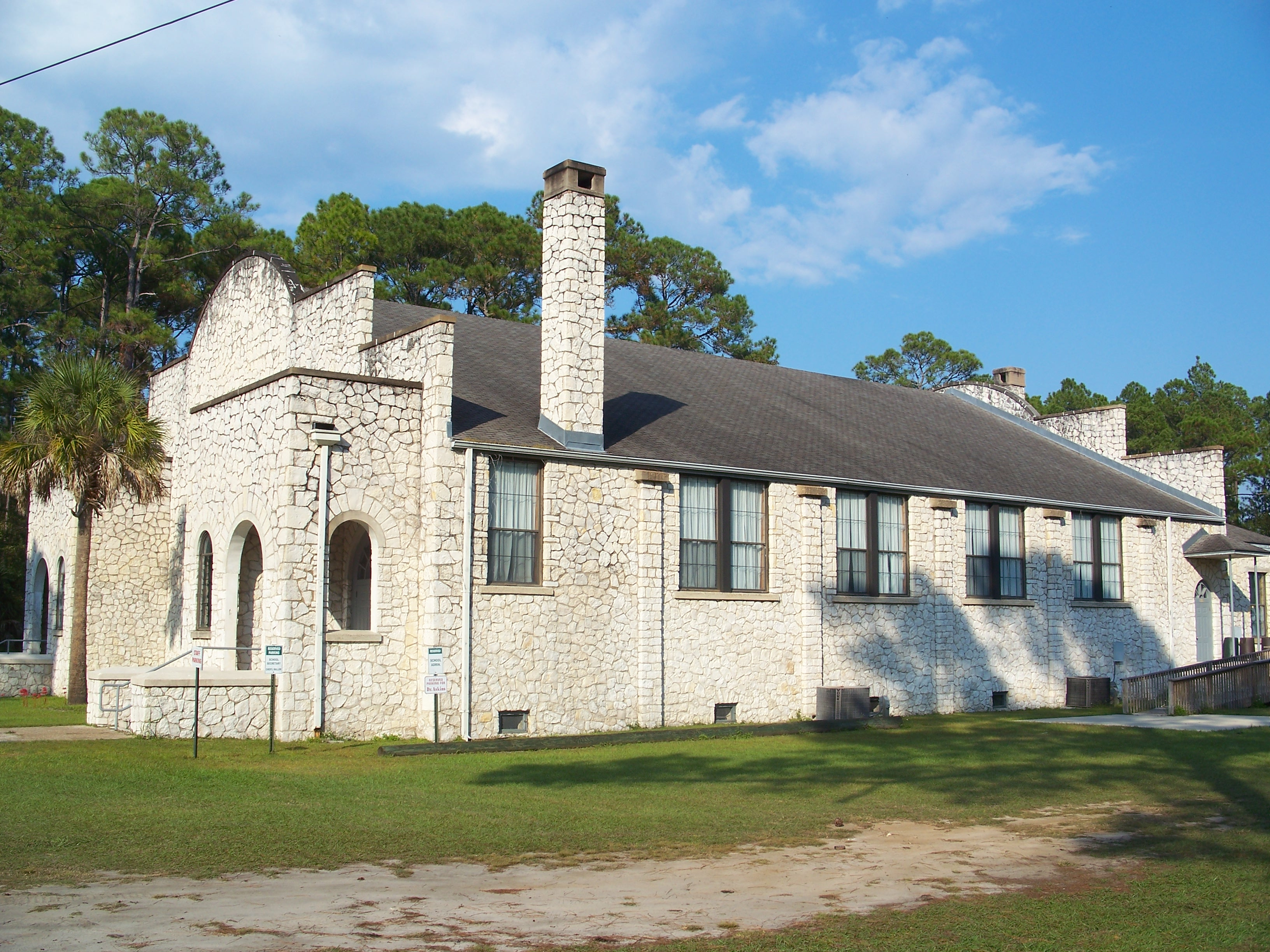

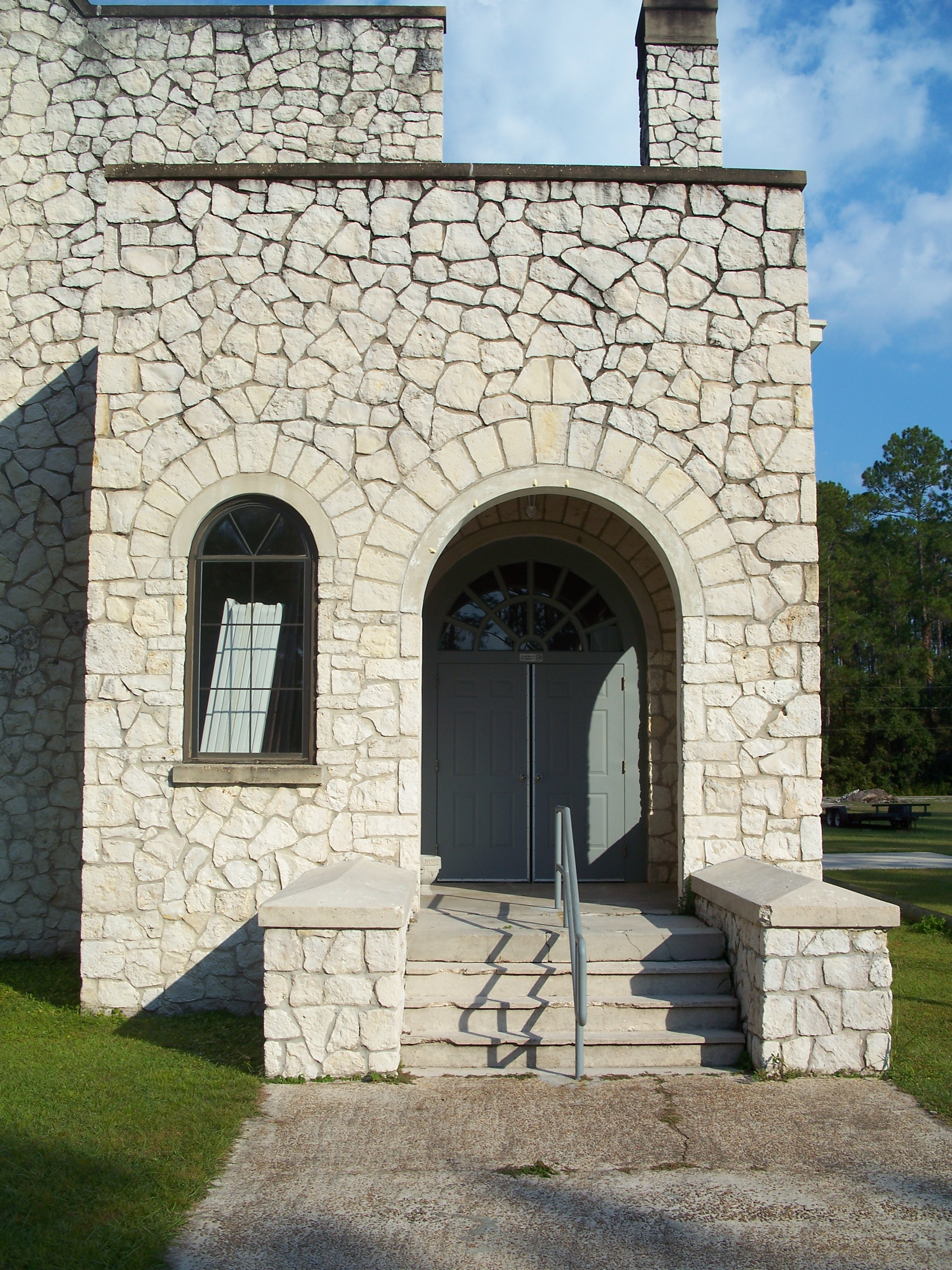

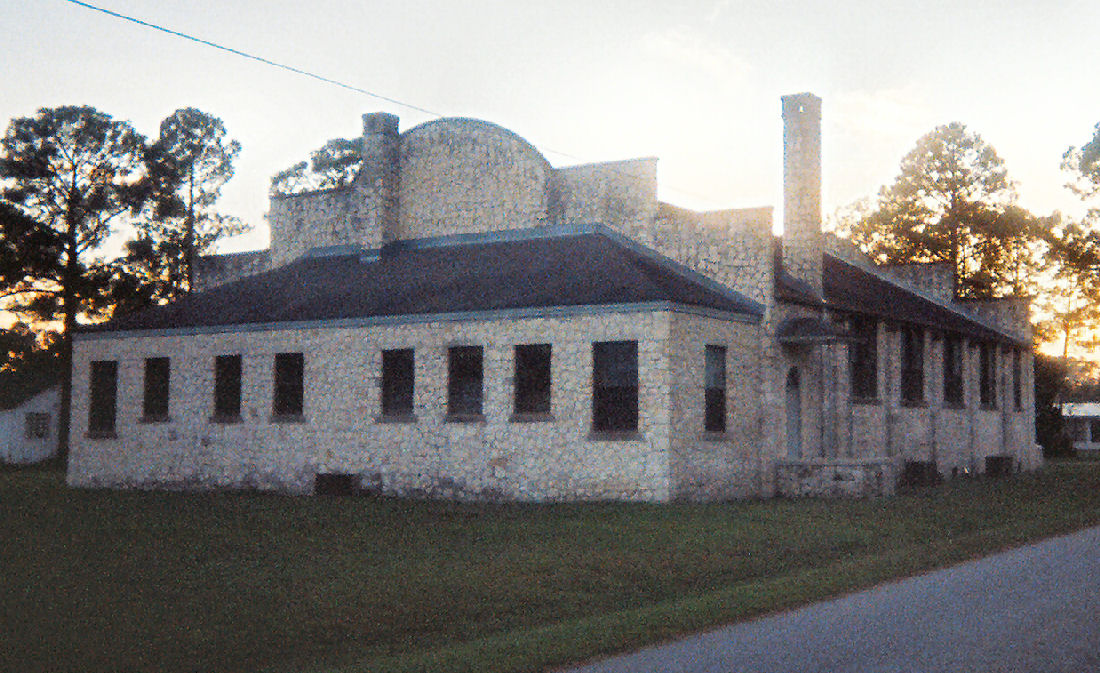
