= Sopchoppy station =

United States historic place in Florida

- Sopchoppy Depot
- U.S. National Register of Historic Places
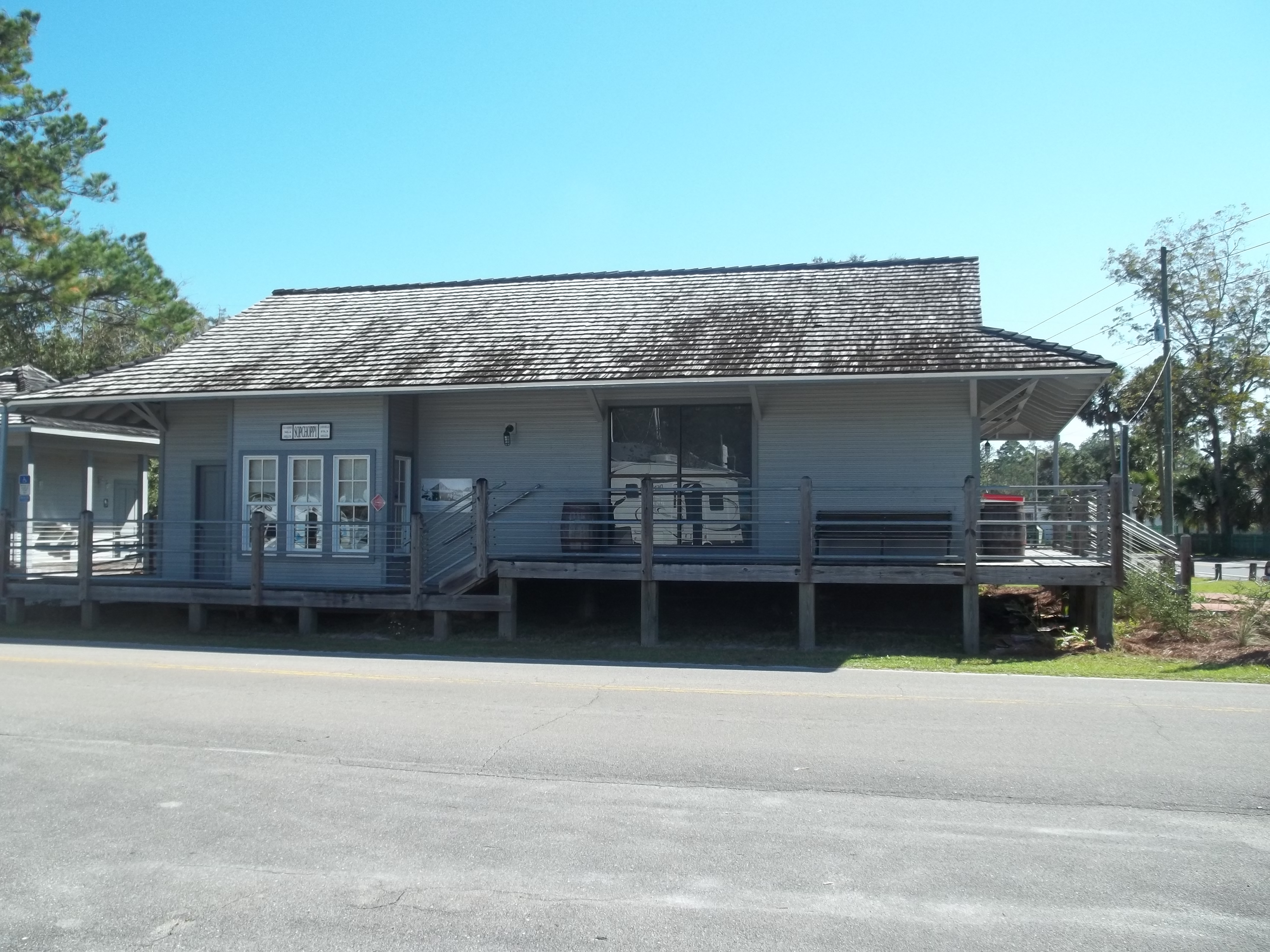

- Location within Florida Location within the United States
- Location: Sopchoppy, Florida
- Coordinates: 30°03′40″N 84°29′28″W
- Built: c. 1894
- NRHP reference No.: 100001738
- Added to NRHP: October 12, 2017

The Sopchoppy Depot is a former railway station in Sopchoppy, Florida. It was constructed by the Carrabelle, Tallahassee and Georgia Railroad in 1894 and spurred development of the town. The rail line passed to the Georgia Florida and Alabama Railroad beginning in 1906. The Seaboard Airline Railroad took over the GF&A in 1927. Passenger service ceased in 1946. The platform was removed and some alterations were made to the building, which was thereafter used for private businesses. It was restored to its original condition after being acquired by the city in 1993, complete with new platforms. The station was added to the National Register of Historic Places on October 12, 2017.

Between 1901 and 1912, the station served as a terminus of the horse-drawn Panacea Tram connecting to the tourist town of Panacea, Florida with its mineral sorings.
