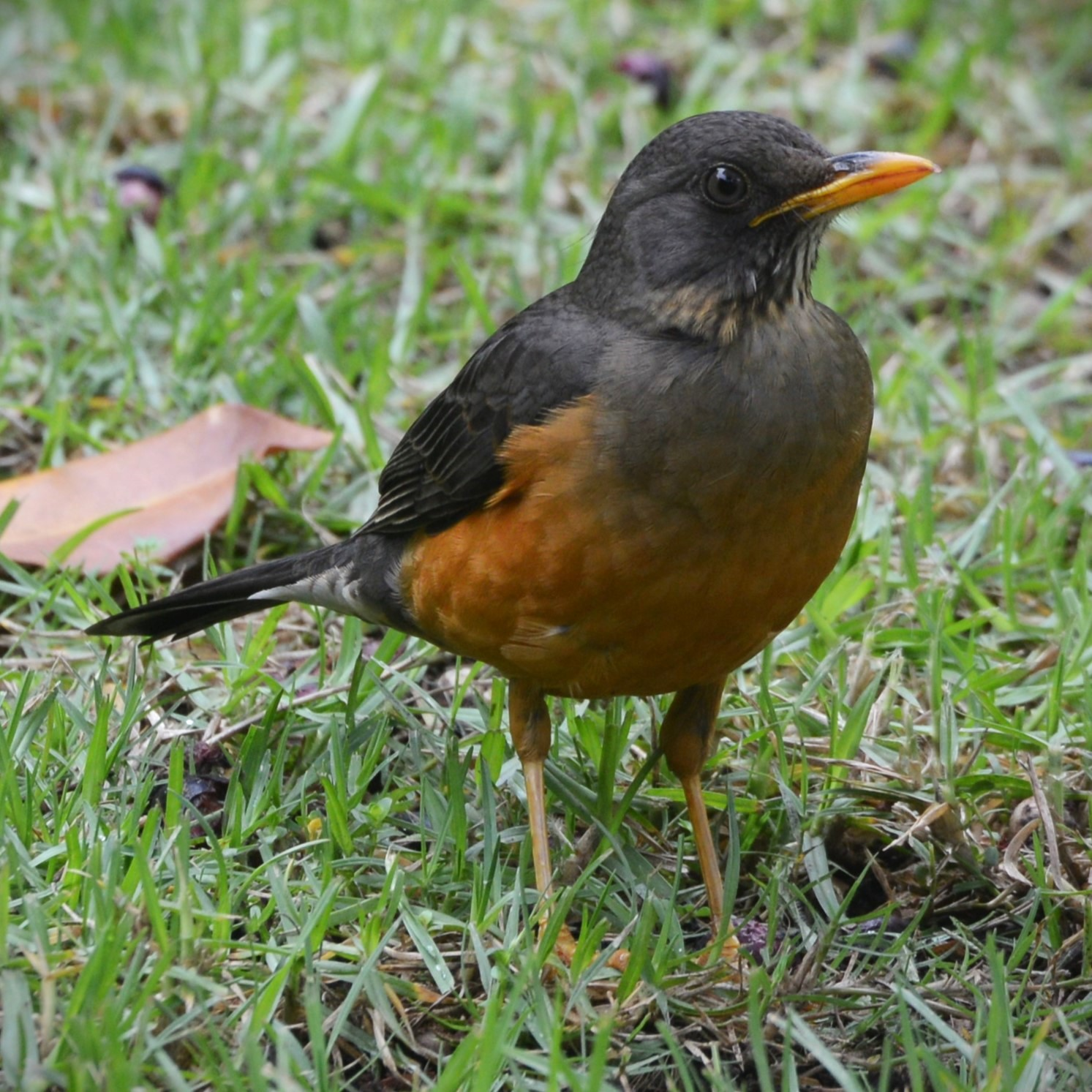
- Olive thrush adult, Greyton, South Africa

Conservation status
- Least Concern (IUCN 3.1)

Scientific classification
- Kingdom: Animalia
- Phylum: Chordata
- Class: Aves
- Order: Passeriformes
- Family: Turdidae
- Genus: Turdus
- Species: T. olivaceus

Binomial name
- Turdus olivaceus Linnaeus, 1766

Audio
- Song recorded in KwaZulu-Natal, South Africa

= Olive thrush =

Species of bird

The olive thrush (Turdus olivaceus) is, in its range, one of the most common members of the thrush family (Turdidae). It occurs in African highlands from the montane regions in Eastern and Central Africa in the north to the Cape of Good Hope in the south. It is a bird of forest and woodland, but has locally adapted to parks and large gardens in suburban areas.

== Taxonomy ==
In 1760 the French zoologist Mathurin Jacques Brisson included a description of the olive thrush in his Ornithologie based on a specimen collected from the Cape of Good Hope in South Africa. He used the French name Le merle olive du Cap de Bonne Espérance and the Latin Merula Olivacea Capitis Bonae Spei. Although Brisson coined Latin names, these do not conform to the binomial system and are not recognised by the International Commission on Zoological Nomenclature. When in 1766 the Swedish naturalist Carl Linnaeus updated his Systema Naturae for the twelfth edition, he added 240 species that had been previously described by Brisson. One of these was the olive thrush. Linnaeus included a brief description, coined the binomial name Turdus olivaceus and cited Brisson's work.

Six subspecies are recognised:

- Turdus olivaceus milanjensis Shelley, 1893 – south Malawi and northwest Mozambique
- Turdus olivaceus swynnertoni Bannerman, 1913 – east Zimbabwe and west Mozambique
- Turdus olivaceus transvaalensis (Roberts, 1936) – northeast South Africa
- Turdus olivaceus culminans Clancey, 1982 – east South Africa
- Turdus olivaceus olivaceus Linnaeus, 1766 – southwest South Africa
- Turdus olivaceus pondoensis Reichenow, 1917 – southeast South Africa
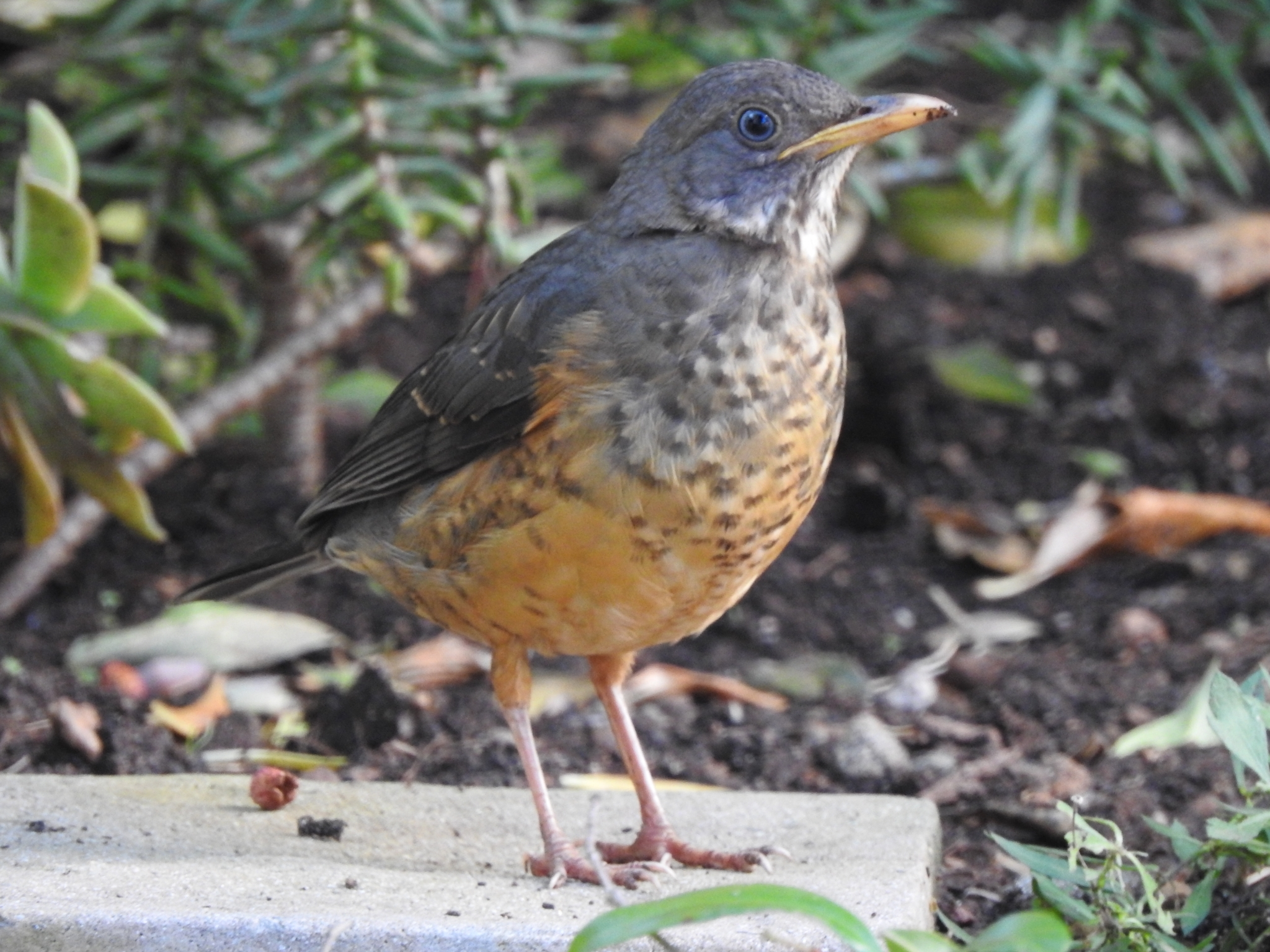

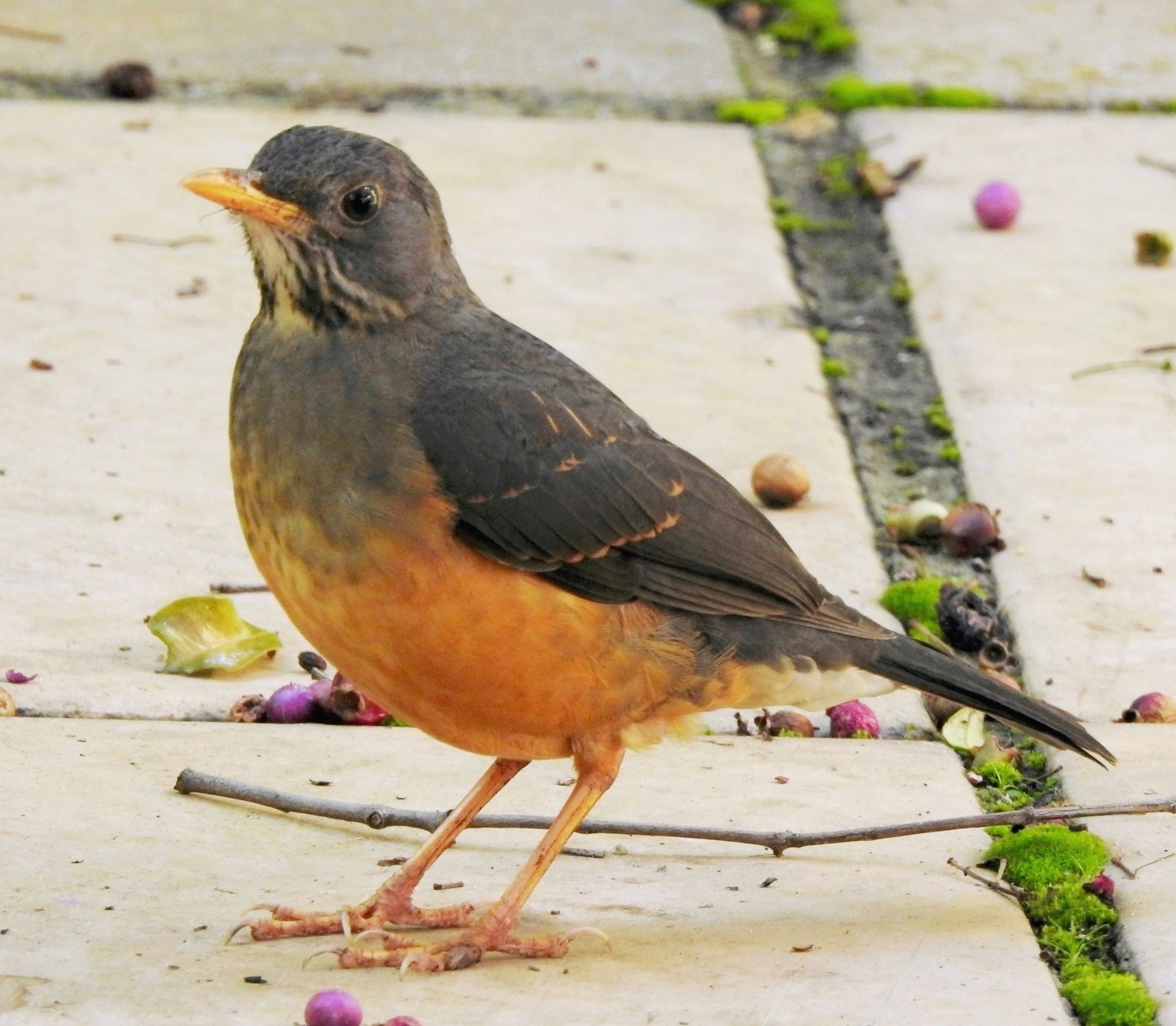
A juvenile and immature of the nominate subspecies near Cape Town, South Africa

The subspecies differ mainly in the relative amounts of white, orange and brown on the underparts. Several additional populations of African Turdus thrushes were previously included within this group, but are now most commonly treated as separate species in their own right including the Karoo thrush (Turdus smithi), the Somali thrush (Turdus ludoviciae) and the more northerly Abyssinian thrush, also known as the Northern olive thrush and Mountain thrush, T. abyssinicus, itself also sometimes considered as several separate species (Abyssinian thrush, T. abyssinicus, Usambara thrush, T. roehli and Taita thrush Turdus helleri).

== Description ==
It can reach a length of 24 cm (9.4 in) and a weight of at least 101 g (3.6 oz). The tail and the upperparts are coloured dull olive brown. The belly is white and the rest of the underparts have an orange hue. The throat is speckled with white spots. It can be found in evergreen forests, parks, and gardens.

The male's song is a mix of fluted, whistled and trilled phrases, which varies geographically. It occasionally mimics other birds.

== Behaviour ==
The female builds a cup nest, typically 2 to 9 m (6 ft 7 in to 29 ft 6 in) above the ground in a tree or hedge. The 1–3 (usually 2) eggs are incubated solely by the female for 14–15 days to hatching, and the chicks fledge in another 16 days.

Its diet consists of earthworms, insects, snails, fruits, and spiders. It's been reported to engage in worm charming in order to bring worms to the surface.
