= Bo Lynn's Grocery =

- U.S. National Register of Historic Places
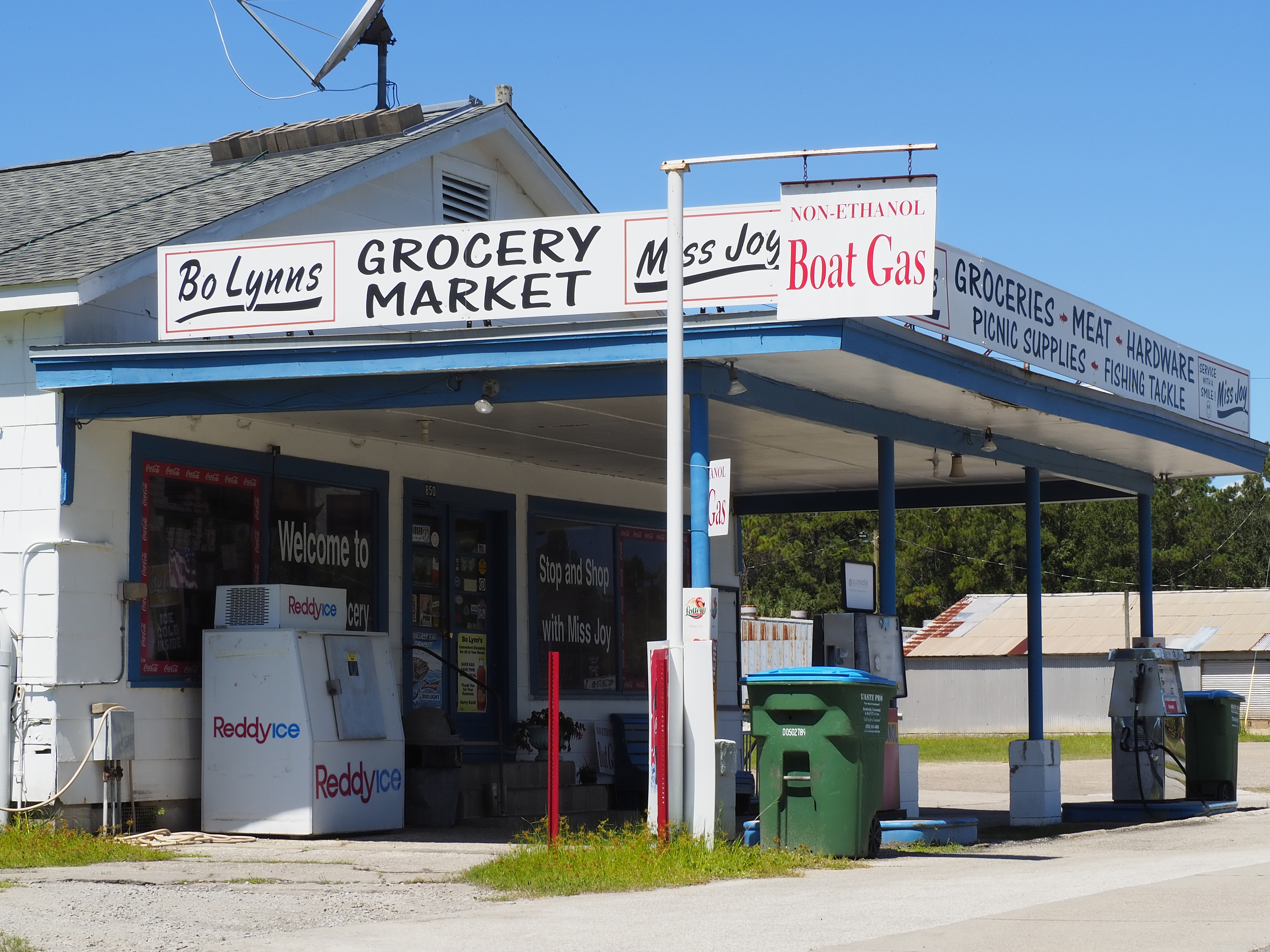

- Location within Florida
- Location: 850 Port Leon Dr. St. Marks
- Coordinates: 30.155163°N 84.203715°W.
- Built: 1936
- NRHP reference No.: 100000643
- Added to NRHP: 14 February 2017

Bo Lynn's Grocery is a small wood general store and gas station located in St. Marks, Florida. When it was listed on the National Register of Historic Places on February 14, 2017, it was the first listing in St. Marks since San Marcos de Apalache in 1966. The store was opened in 1936 by J. T. "Bo" Lynn and has been in continuous operation since then. It has been owned by Joy Brown since 1965. It was for most of its history the largest grocery store and gas station in the town and was listed for its significance in Commerce at the local level.
