= Sopchoppy, Florida =

- City
- City of Sopchoppy
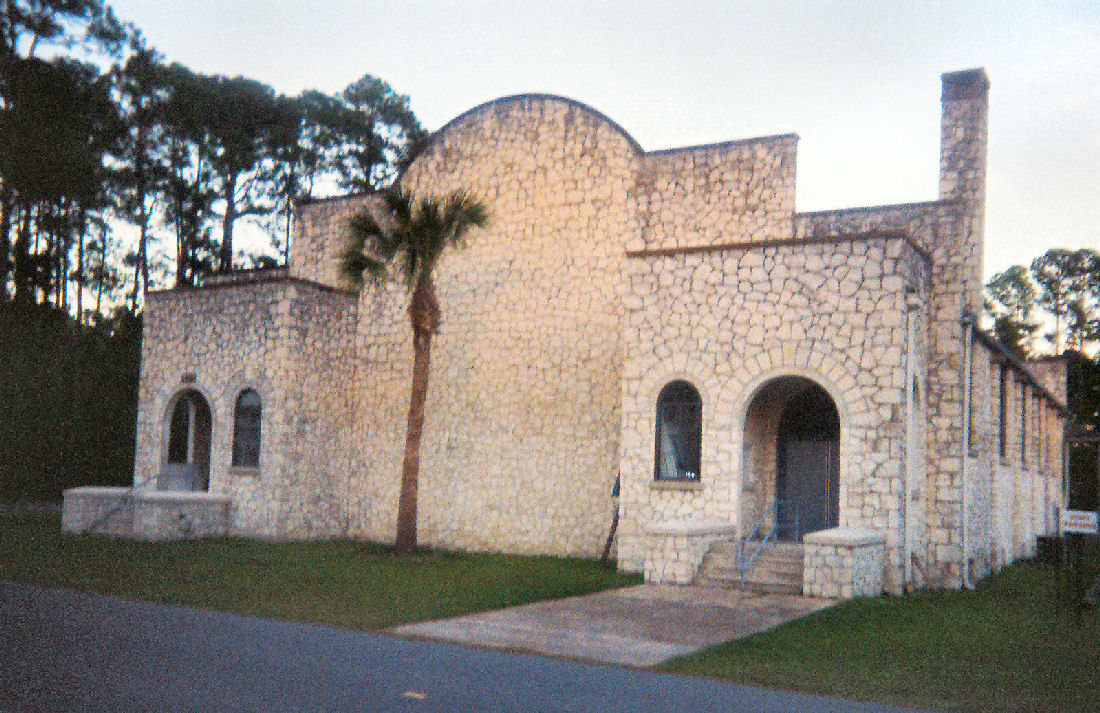
- Old Sopchoppy High School Gymnasium

- Location in Wakulla County and the state of Florida
- Coordinates: 30°03′31″N 84°29′45″W
- Country: United States
- State: Florida
- County: Wakulla
- Settled: 1894
- Incorporated: 1955

Government
  - Type: Mayor-Council
  - Mayor: Leonard Tartt
  - Vice Mayor: Lara Edwards
  - Council Members: Nathan Lewis, Fred McClendon, and Mary Katherine Westmark
  - City Clerk: Ashley Schilling
  - City Attorney: Daniel H. Cox

Area
  - Total: 1.68 sq mi (4.35 km^{2})
  - Land: 1.68 sq mi (4.35 km^{2})
  - Water: 0 sq mi (0.00 km^{2})
- Elevation: 23 ft (7.0 m)

Population (2020)
  - Total: 426
  - Density: 253.8/sq mi (98.01/km^{2})
- Time zone: UTC-5 (Eastern (EST))
  - Summer (DST): UTC-4 (EDT)
- ZIP code: 32358
- Area codes: 850, 448
- FIPS code: 12-66925
- GNIS feature ID: 2405485
- Website: www.sopchoppy.org

Sopchoppy is a city in Wakulla County, Florida, United States. The city is located on the Florida Panhandle in North Florida, with Ochlockonee River State Park located nearby. It is part of the Tallahassee, Florida Metropolitan Statistical Area. The population was 426 at the 2020 census, down from 457 at the 2010 census.

== Geography ==
According to the United States Census Bureau, the city has a total area of 1.5 square miles (3.9 km^{2}), all land.

=== Climate ===
The climate in this area is characterized by hot, humid summers and generally mild winters. According to the Köppen climate classification, the City of Sopchoppy has a humid subtropical climate zone (Cfa).

== History ==
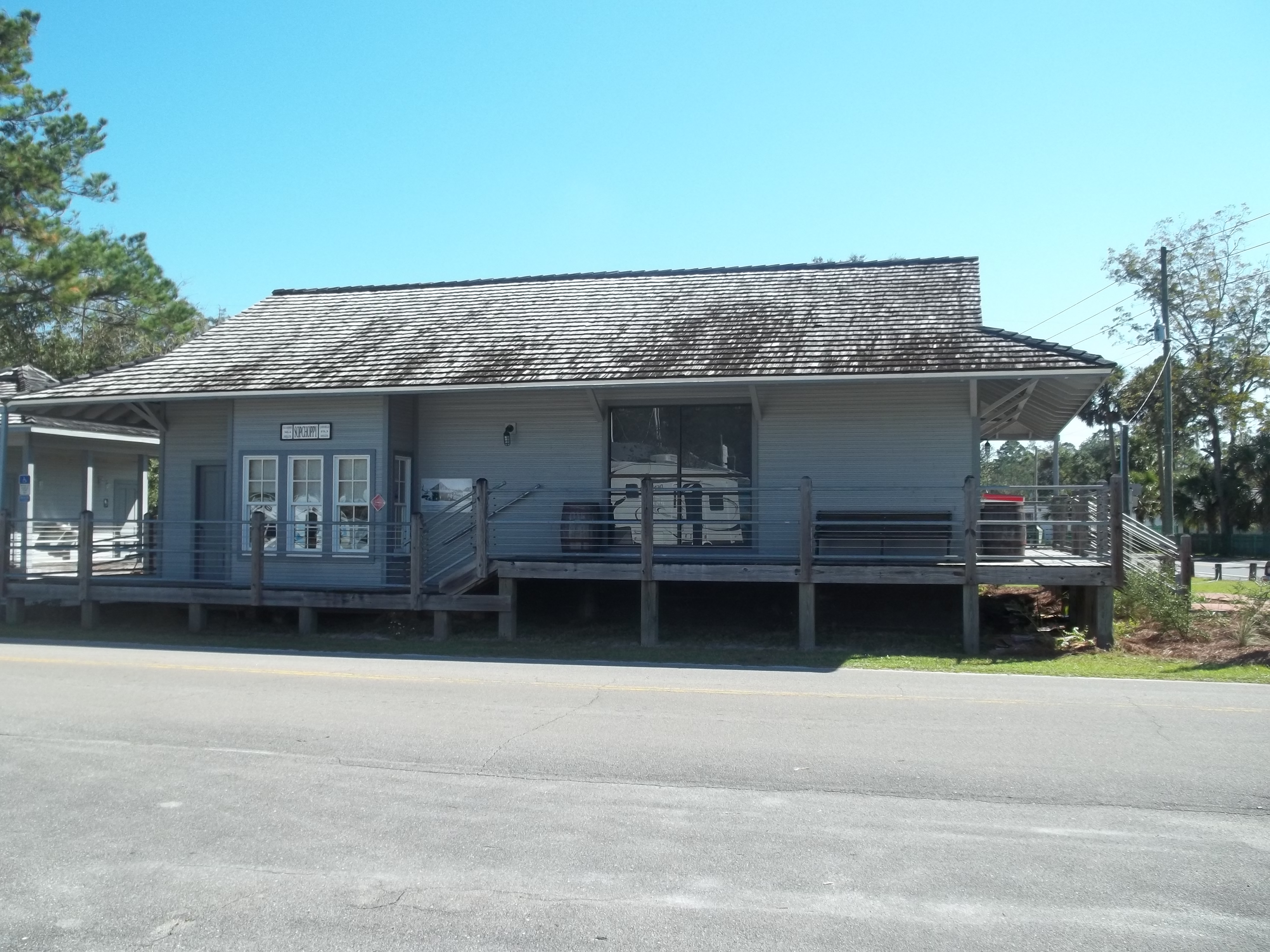
Sopchoppy Depot

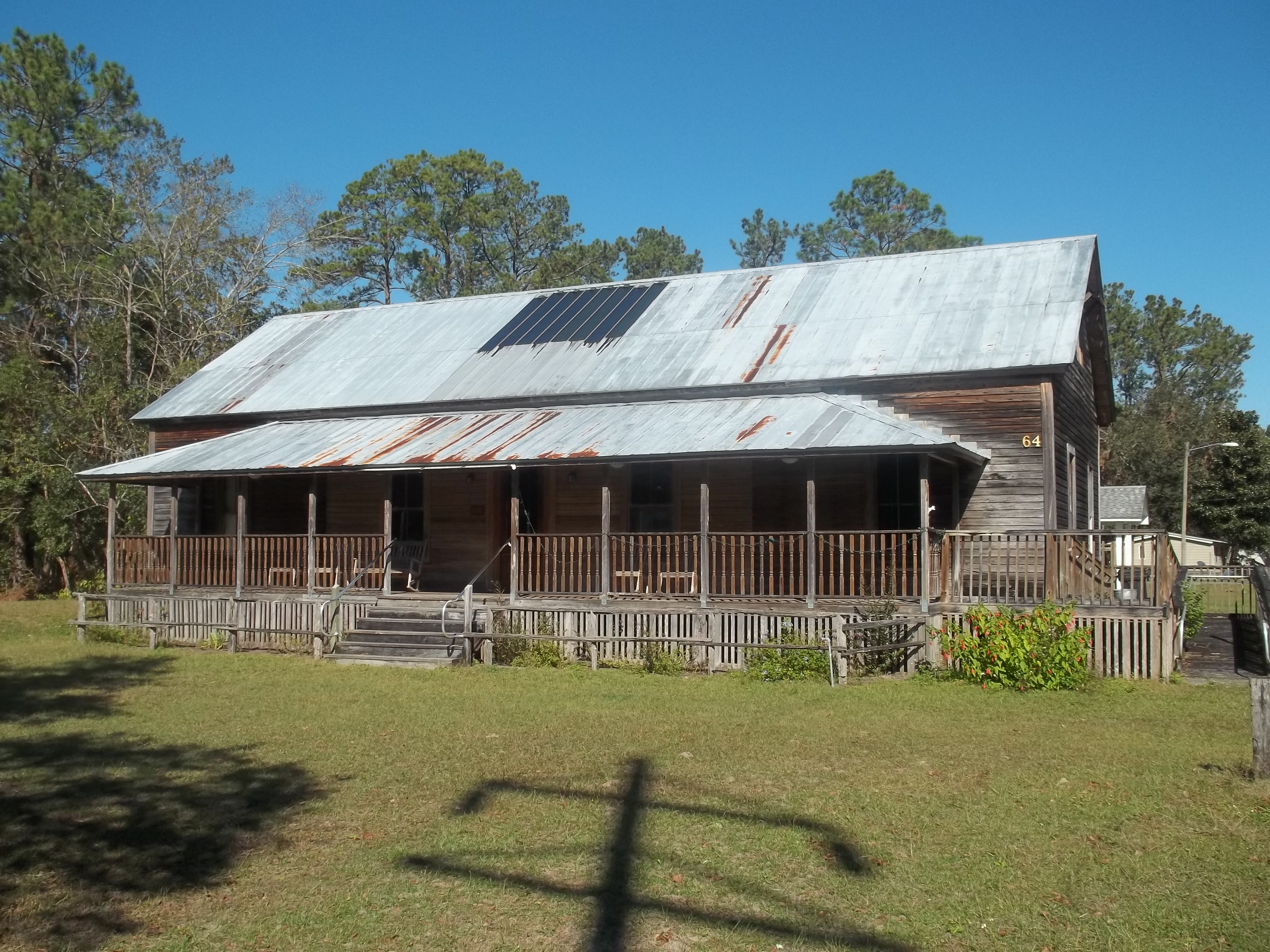
A historic Sopchoppy home, Towles House

The city's name is a corruption of "Lockchoppe", derived from the Muskogee lokchapi ("lokcha" meaning "acorn", and "api" meaning "stem"), which was the old name of the nearby river.

Mention of Sopchoppy can be found in 1850, in a runaway slave ad published by Henry Mash in the May 7, 1850 Florida Sentinel newspaper of Tallahassee. This is nearly 50 years earlier than the 1894 claim noted below.

Sopchoppy came into existence in 1894 after the CT&G Railroad Company built a railway through the area. It platted the city on property it already owned in the area, across the river from Greenough. To encourage people to settle the area, the railroad engaged in an advertising campaign, exaggerating the quality of the soil and climate.

The Sopchoppy Depot was built in 1894. Now a museum, it was built for the Carrabelle, Tallahassee & Georgia Railroad (G. F. & A.), and referred to colloquially as the "Gopher, Frog & Alligator, Company", which was absorbed by the Georgia, Florida and Alabama Railroad. The line began in 1893 and closed in 1946. It transported lumber, turpentine and related products, honey, farm produce, soldiers, fish and oysters packed in barrels in ice as well as sturgeon caviar from the Sopchoppy River, frog legs, and catfish.

Although it has existed as a settlement since at least 1894, the City of Sopchoppy was officially incorporated as a municipality in 1955.

== Demographics ==
Historical population
Census	Pop.	Note	%±
1960	450		—
1970	460		2.2%
1980	444		−3.5%
1990	367		−17.3%
2000	426		16.1%
2010	457		7.3%
2020	426		−6.8%
U.S. Decennial Census

=== 2010 and 2020 census ===
Sopchoppy racial composition (Hispanics excluded from racial categories) (NH = Non-Hispanic)
Race	Pop 2010	Pop 2020	% 2010	% 2020
White (NH)	318	314	69.58%	73.71%
Black or African American (NH)	113	76	24.73%	17.84%
Native American or Alaska Native (NH)	2	4	0.44%	0.94%
Asian (NH)	3	1	0.66%	0.23%
Pacific Islander or Native Hawaiian (NH)	0	0	0.00%	0.00%
Some other race (NH)	0	0	0.00%	0.00%
Two or more races/Multiracial (NH)	11	17	2.41%	3.99%
Hispanic or Latino (any race)	10	14	2.19%	3.29%
Total	457	426		

As of the 2020 United States census, there were 426 people, 220 households, and 119 families residing in the city.

As of the 2010 United States census, there were 457 people, 165 households, and 110 families residing in the city.

=== 2000 census ===
As of the 2000 census, there were 426 people, 178 households, and 111 families residing in the city. The population density was 280.4 inhabitants per square mile (108.3/km^{2}). There were 216 housing units at an average density of 142.2 per square mile (54.9/km^{2}). The racial makeup of the city was 78.40% White, 18.08% African American, 1.17% Native American, 0.70% Asian, 1.17% from other races, and 0.47% from two or more races. Hispanic or Latino of any race were 3.99% of the population.

In 2000, there were 178 households, out of which 32.0% had children under the age of 18 living with them, 43.8% were married couples living together, 15.2% had a female householder with no husband present, and 37.6% were non-families. 32.6% of all households were made up of individuals, and 11.2% had someone living alone who was 65 years of age or older. The average household size was 2.39 and the average family size was 3.09.

In 2000, in the city, the population was spread out, with 26.8% under the age of 18, 8.2% from 18 to 24, 29.1% from 25 to 44, 22.5% from 45 to 64, and 13.4% who were 65 years of age or older. The median age was 38 years. For every 100 females, there were 86.0 males. For every 100 females age 18 and over, there were 80.3 males.

The median income for a household in the city was $29,583, and the median income for a family was $33,750. Males had a median income of $30,833 versus $17,188 for females. The per capita income for the city was $14,165. About 14.4% of families and 17.1% of the population were below the poverty line, including 11.9% of those under age 18 and 48.2% of those age 65 or over.

== Notable people ==
- B. K. Roberts, Florida Supreme Court Justice, was born in Sopchoppy

== Festivals ==
The city is home to the annual American Worm Gruntin' Festival, a city celebration named in honor of a worm grunting—also known as worm charming—a method for driving worms to the surface of the earth. Worm charmers hammer wooden stakes into the ground, then rub them with metal slabs. The resulting vibrations cause worms to surface, whereupon they are typically gathered and used or sold for fishing bait. The festival includes a 1.4 mile “Fun Run”, a worm grunting competition, live music, craft vendors, and a ball.

Part of Tim Dorsey's 2017 novel Clownfish Blues is set in Sopchoppy, and worm grunting is a plot element.
