= Blackbird =

Blackbird, blackbirds, black bird or black birds may refer to:

== Birds in the parvorder Passerida ==
- New World blackbirds, family Icteridae
- Old World blackbirds, any of several species belonging to the genus Turdus in the family Turdidae:
  - Chinese blackbird
  - Common blackbird
  - Grey-winged blackbird
  - Indian blackbird
  - Somali thrush or Somali blackbird
  - Tibetan blackbird
  - White-collared blackbird

== Arts, entertainment, and media ==
=== Literature ===
- "The Blackbird" (short story), 1928, by Robert Musil
- Black Bird (Basilières novel), 2003, by Michel Basilières
- Blackbird (Dibia novel), 2011
- Blackbirds (Wendig novel), 2012, by Chuck Wendig
- Blackbird (memoir), 2000, by Jennifer Lauck
- Blackbird, a 1986 novel by Larry Duplechan
- Blackbird (journal), an online journal of literature and the arts
- Black Bird (manga), 2007, by Kanoko Sakurakoji
- "Blackbird", a short story in Fragments of Horror
- Blackbird (comics), an aircraft in the X-Men comics
- Blackbird (Femizon), a villain in the Marvel Comics universe
- Blackbird, a comic by Sam Humphries
- Fazbear Frights #6: Blackbird, 2020, by Scott Cawthon

=== Film, theatre and TV ===
==== Film and television ====
- Black Bird, a 1973 South Korean film featuring Namkoong Won
- Black Birds (film), a 1967 Yugoslav film
- Blackbird (2007 film), directed by Adam Rapp
- Blackbird (2012 film), directed by Jason Buxton
- Blackbird (2013 film), a 2013 drama film
- Blackbird (2014 film), directed by Patrik-Ian Polk
- Blackbird (2018 film), a spy film directed by, written by and starring Michael Flatley
- Blackbird (2019 film), a drama film directed by Roger Michell
- Blackbirds (1915 film), a silent film starring Laura Hope Crews
- Blackbirds (1920 film), a lost silent film starring Justine Johnstone
- The Black Bird, a 1975 film starring George Segal
- The Blackbird, a 1926 film directed by Tod Browning
- Deadfall (2012 film), directed by Stefan Ruzowitzky, which had the working title Blackbird
- Beyond the Lights, a 2014 film directed by Gina Prince-Bythewood originally titled Blackbird
- Black Bird (miniseries), a 2022 Apple TV+ miniseries

==== Theatre ====
- Blackbird (play), 2005, by David Harrower
- Blackbird, a play by Adam Rapp
- Blackbirds of 1928, a Broadway revue, based on the 1926 London revue Blackbirds
- Blackbirds of 1933, a follow-up to Blackbirds of 1928

=== Music ===
==== Instruments ====
- Blackbird (violin), a playable full size violin made of igneous rock
- Epiphone Blackbird, an electric bass guitar

==== Groups ====
- Blackbird (band), an American post-punk band
- The Blackbirds (German band), 1960s
- The Blackbirds (South African band)
- The Blackbyrds, an American rhythm and blues and jazz-funk fusion group

==== Albums ====
- Black Byrd, 1973, by Donald Byrd
- Blackbird (Alter Bridge album), 2007
- Blackbird (Fat Freddy's Drop album), 2013, or the title song
- Blackbird (Dan Sultan album), 2014
- Musta Lindu, re-released as Black Bird, by Värttinä

==== Songs and compositions ====
- "Blackbird" (Beatles song), 1968
- "Blackbird" (Alter Bridge song), 2007
- Le Merle noir ("The Blackbird"), a chamber work by Olivier Messiaen
- "Bye Bye Blackbird", a 1926 jazz standard by Ray Henderson and Mort Dixon often known simply as "Blackbird"
- "Blackbird", a song by Alkaline Trio from Is This Thing Cursed?
- "Black Bird", a song by the Beautiful Girls
- "Blackbird", a song by Benny Benassi from ...Phobia
- "Blackbird", a song by Black Veil Brides from The Phantom Tomorrow
- "Blackbird", a song by Dido from Girl Who Got Away
- "Blackbirds", a song by Erin McKeown from Distillation
- "Blackbird", a song by Graves
- "Blackbird", a song by Madness from Can't Touch Us Now
- "Blackbird", a song by Marcy Playground from Leaving Wonderland...in a fit of rage
- "Blackbird", an instrumental by Mike Oldfield from Light + Shade
- "Blackbird", a 2017 song by Norma John; Finland's entry in the 2017 Eurovision Song Contest
- "Blackbird", a song by Silly Wizard from Live Wizardry
- "Blackbird", a song by Nina Simone from Nina Simone with Strings
- "Blackbird", a song by Tash Sultana from Flow State
- "Blackbird", a song by Third Day from Third Day
- "Blackbirds", a song by Linkin Park from the video game 8-Bit Rebellion!
- "The Blackbird", a song from Jacobite Relics
- "The Blackbird", a song by the Wurzels

=== Other uses in arts and media ===
- Black Bird (video game), a 2018 shoot-em-up video game
- Blackbird, a car in the anime Wangan Midnight and the video game, Wangan Midnight Maximum Tune
- Task Force Blackbird, a CIA organization in the video game Medal of Honor: Warfighter

== People ==
- Blackbird (Omaha leader) (c. 1750–1800)
- Andrew Blackbird (c. 1815–1908), Odawa leader and historian
- Lewis Blackbird (born 1987), British motorcycle speedway rider
- King Parsons (born 1949), American wrestler who used the ring name "The Blackbird"
- Ziryab (789–857), Kurdish musician and performer, whose name means "blackbird" or "nightingale"

== Places ==
- Blackbird, Delaware
- Blackbird Hundred, an unincorporated subdivision of New Castle County, Delaware, U.S.
- Blackbird Leys, a civil parish in Oxford, England
- Blackbird mine, a defunct cobalt mine in Lemhi County, Idaho, U.S.
- Blackbird Township, Thurston County, Nebraska
- Blackbird Vineyards, a California winery

== Science and technology ==
=== Computing ===
- Blackbird (online platform), a cancelled Microsoft MSN development platform
- Blackbird (software), video software
- Apple Computer's Macintosh IIfx desktop computer (internal codename "Blackbird")
- Apple Computer's PowerBook 500 series of laptops (internal codename "Blackbird")
- HP Blackbird 002, a personal computer

=== Vehicles ===
==== Air ====
- Lockheed SR-71 Blackbird, a US Air Force supersonic reconnaissance aircraft
- A-12 Blackbird, the unofficial nickname for the forerunner to the SR-71 Blackbird, codenamed A-12 OXCART
- Aero A.34 Kos (English: Blackbird), a 1930s Czechoslovak biplane
- Mutual Blackbird, a late 1920s biplane

==== Land and rail ====
- Blackbird (wind-powered vehicle), a wheeled vehicle that demonstrated its ability to go downwind faster than the wind
- Blackbird, a GWR 3300 Class steam locomotive on the Great Western Railway in England
- Super Blackbird, a model name given to the Honda CBR1100XX sport-touring motorcycle
- "The Blackbird", a dragster driven by professional racer Jack Beckman

== Sport ==
- Baltimore Blackbirds, a defunct indoor American football team
- FC Jyväskylä Blackbird, a Finnish football club
- LIU Brooklyn Blackbirds, teams of Long Island University's Brooklyn campus

== See also ==
- Blackbeard (c. 1680–1718), English pirate
- Blackbirding, a recruitment practice utilizing trickery or kidnapping
- Bluebird (disambiguation)
- Redbird (disambiguation)
