= Show Me the Way =

Show Me the Way may refer to:

== Books ==
- Show Me the Way, a 2004 collection of short stories by Jennifer Lauck

== Music ==
=== Songs ===
- "Show Me the Way" (Peter Frampton song), 1975
- "Show Me the Way" (Styx song), 1990
- "Show Me the Way" (Mr. President song), 1996
- "Show Me the Way" (Lead song), 2002
- "Show Me the Way" (Earth, Wind & Fire song), 2005
- "Show Me the Way" (The Cranberries song), 2012
- "Show Me the Way", a song from the 2011 Alexandra Stan album Saxobeats
- "Show Me the Way", a song from the 2011 Allure album Kiss from the Past featuring JES
- "Show Me the Way", a song released as a single in 1971 by Brian Cadd & Don Mudie
- "Show Me the Way", a song from the 2012 Billy Talent album Dead Silence
- "Show Me the Way", a song from the 2008 Black Tide album Light from Above
- "Show Me the Way", a 2017 song by Marco & Seba
- "Show Me the Way", a song by Irving Berlin

== See also ==
- Show Me Your Way, a 1991 Glen Campbell album
