= Literary Arts =

Literary Arts may refer to:

- Creative writing or literature
- Literary Arts, Inc., an American arts organization that presents the annual Oregon Book Awards
