= Bodyrock =

Bodyrock or Body Rock may refer to:

== Film ==
- Body Rock, a 1984 film

== Music ==
- Bodyrock (album), a 1989 album by Lee Aaron
- "Bodyrock" (song), a 1999 song by Moby
- "Body Rock", a 1984 song by Maria Vidal, theme from the 1984 film
- "Body Rock", a 2001 song by Shimon and Andy C
- "Body Rock", a 2025 song by prettydrama
- "Bodyrock", a 2001 song by Tymes 4
- BodyRockers, a music group

== Other uses ==
- BodyRock Sport, a sports bra manufacturer
