= Blackbird (memoir) =

2000 book by Jennifer Lauck

- Author: Jennifer Lauck
- Language: English
- Publisher: Simon & Schuster
- Publication date: 2000

Blackbird is a memoir by the American journalist and author Jennifer Lauck. Published in October 2000, Blackbird became a New York Times bestseller and was translated into twenty-two languages, making the bestseller lists in London, Ireland and Spain. In this memoir, Lauck conveys the perceptions, thoughts, and emotions of a frightened child in her account of the six years during which both of her parents died. Lauck was given the Book Sense 76 award and was featured in Newsweek, Harper's Bazaar, Talk, People, Glamour and Writer's Digest. She was a select USA Today pick and nominated for two Oregon Book Awards.

Blackbird is used as a source reference by foster parenting organizations nationwide, providing caregivers with inspiration and insight about taking in parentless children. Blackbird is also used at The Dougy Center, helping children who are grieving the loss of a parent. Lauck has been in collaboration with Yale professors and partners in the Post Traumatic Stress Center in New Haven, Connecticut, Hadar Lubin, MD and David Reed Johnson, Ph. D. Their center routinely gives out copies of Blackbird and Still Waters to patients working to heal childhood trauma.

== Critical reception ==
Blackbird received both commercial success and critical acclaim.

- Lauck was featured on The Oprah Winfrey Show. Winfrey told her audience, "This should have been a Book of the Month book. Read it now!"
- Frank McCourt, author of the Pulitzer Prize-winning memoir Angela's Ashes, wrote of Blackbird: "Written gloriously and movingly."
- The Times of London wrote: "Lauck has constructed a riveting narrative from the awful mess of her life. That she has managed to do so fills me with an admiration for which I cannot find words. The best I can do is to suggest that you read this book."
- Kirkus Reviews wrote, "A searing, soaring memoir of one girl's complicated and almost unbelievable childhood...Lauck's literary achievements—voice, characterization, pacing—are as extraordinary as those of Frank McCourt and Dave Eggers, if not more so. A lost childhood reclaimed in profound triumph, and with the promise of a sequel to match."
