= BodyRock Sport =

Women's activewear manufacturer

Coordinates: 40.74936°N 73.98274°W

- Headquarters: California, United States
- Products: "blinged-out" sports bras
- Website: www.bodyrocksport.com

BodyRock Sport is a manufacturer sports bras and women's activewear. The bras are described as "blinged-out", with Swarovski crystals or studs, and conveniences such as zippered compartments and built-in pockets for digital audio players.

== Charities ==
BodyRock Sport supports the following charities:

- New York Road Runners' Team for Kids
- Girls' LEAP (Lifetime Empowerment & Awareness Program)
- American Cancer Society
- The Dougy Center
- LA's BEST: After School Enrichment
- International Princess Project

== See also ==
- Sportswear (activewear)
