= Jennifer Lauck =

American writer

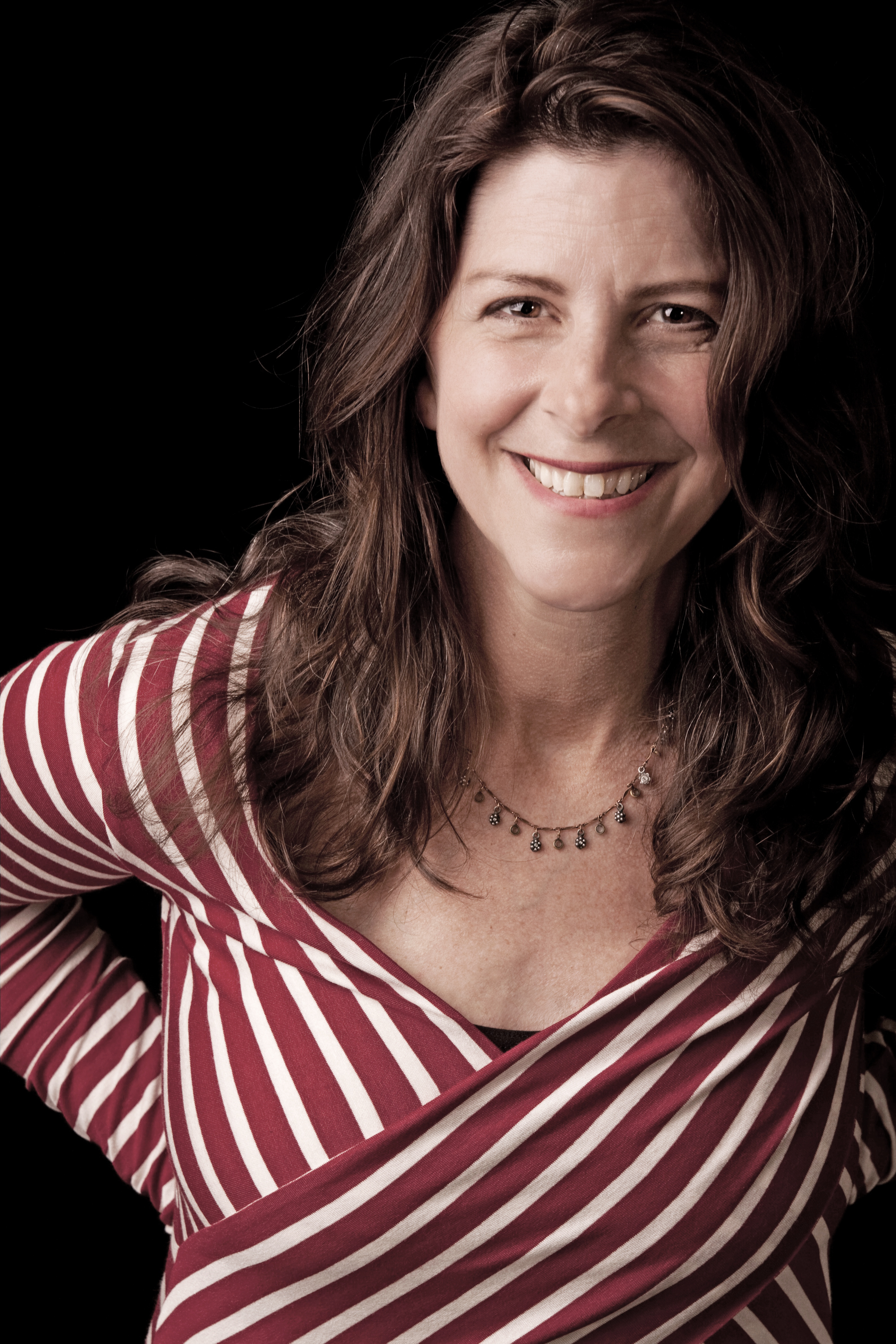
- Born: December 15, 1963 (age 62); Reno, Nevada
- Citizenship: United States
- Education: Montana State University (BA); Pacific Lutheran University (MFA)
- Writing career
- Notable works: Blackbird: A Childhood Lost and Found

Jennifer Lauck (born December 15, 1963) is an American fiction and non-fiction author, essayist, speaker and writing instructor. She is the author of four books including the New York Times best seller Blackbird. Her writing has been published in the U.S. and around the world and translated into several languages. Much of her popularity began when she appeared on the Oprah Winfrey Show in 2000 and Winfrey held the book up to her audience saying, "This should have been a book of the month book. Read it now."

== Early life and education ==
Born in Reno, Nevada, Lauck split her early childhood between the states of Nevada and California, with her adoptive family. After her mother died in 1971, Lauck remained with her adoptive father and brother until her father died in 1973. At that time, Lauck was separated from her adoptive brother and raised in Nevada and Washington state and adopted a second time by the paternal side of her adoptive family.

== Professional career ==
Lauck's early adulthood was spent in Washington, Montana and Oregon where she completed a BA in journalism at Montana State University and then took a reporting job with the Montana Television Network. Lauck's journalism career took her to Spokane, Washington, where she worked for KXLY-TV, then Portland, Oregon, where she worked for KATU-TV as a news producer and special reports producer. Her reports and investigative journalism appeared on CNN and the ABC Nightly News. She won two awards from the Society of Professional Journalists for her reporting.

Blackbird, her first memoir, debuted on The New York Times Best Seller list in November 2000, dropping off and then returning to the Best Seller list in January 2001. Blackbird detailed Lauck's memories of her difficult childhood and was followed in October 2001 by her next book, Still Waters, that documented her life until her 30s and the birth of her first child. In Still Waters, Lauck attempts to understand the suicide death of her adoptive brother whom she was separated from as a young girl. In 2005, she published a collection of short stories titled Show Me the Way in which she took a closer look at her parenting of her two children.

Lauck discussed her reasons for writing her first and subsequent memoirs in an interview with Literary Mama: "...memoir writing was born from the realization that I wanted to have children. I knew I had to go through some deep self-examination before bringing forth a child and I knew traditional avenues of therapy would never give me the insights and relative self-mastery I needed to be a competent mother."

Lauck continued to explore her childhood and discover the impact of her adoption through work with adoption expert Nancy Verrier, author of The Primal Wound and Coming Home to Self. After the publication of her first three memoirs, Lauck sought out and reunited with her birth family. She completed a Masters in Creative Writing from Pacific Lutheran University in 2011 and in 2012 Seal Press published her fourth memoir, Found: A Memoir, that focused on the impact of adoption and Lauck's reunion with her birth family.

Lauck developed an interest in and began to seriously study Buddhism when her children were young. She explores her journey with Buddhism in Found and she has published essays on Buddhism with Lion's Roar and Buddha Dharma.

In addition to publishing her memoirs and her work as a journalist, Lauck lectures, publishes essays, and teaches writing.

== Published work ==
- Blackbird, 2000
- Still Waters, 2001
- September 11th From Abroad, "September 11: West Coast Writers Approach Ground Zero, Jeff Meyers, Editor, Portland, OR: Hawthorne Books & Literary Arts, Inc., 2002
- Show Me the Way, 2004
- It Takes a Village, "It's a Boy, Women Writers on Raising Sons," Andrea Buchanan, Editor, Berkeley, CA: Seal Press, 2005
- Not So Perfect, "Literary Mama: Reading for the Maternally Inclined," Andrea Buchanan, Editor, Berkeley, CA: Seal Press, 2006
- Links, "It's a Girl: Women Writers on Raising Daughters," Andrea Buchanan, Editor, Berkeley, CA: Seal Press, 2006
- Reentry, Buddha Dharma, Spring, 2007
- Reentry, "Best Buddhist Writing 2007," Melvin McLeod, Editor, Boston, MA: Shambala Press, 2007.
- Abducted Vs Adopted, Huffington Post, Feb. 9, 2011.
- Adoption Myth Buster, Huffington Post, Feb. 13, 2011.
- The Memoir Dilemma, Huffington Post, Feb. 21, 2011.
- Super Daughters, Super Powers, Huffington Post, Mar. 6, 2011.
- Forgive the Unforgivable, Huffington Post, Mar. 12, 2011.
- Four Ways to Manage Fear, Huffington Post, Mar. 16, 2011.
- Found, (2012)
- Let it Bee, Lion's Roar, November 2011.
- Let it Bee, "Right Here with You, Bringing Mindful Awareness into Our Relationships," Andrea Miller, Editor: Boston, MA, Lion's Roar, 2011.
- The One Year Marriage, "Knitting Yarns: Writers on Knitting," New York: W. W. Norton & Company, 2013.

== Awards and nominations ==
- Excellence in Journalism, Television, Society of Professional Journalists, 1988
- First Place, General News Reporting, Society of Professional Journalists, 1988
- Blackbird: Oregon Book Awards, Literary Arts, Portland, OR (nominated)
- Blackbird: Garden State Teen Book Award (nominated)
- Blackbird: Pennsylvania Young Reader's Choice Award (nominated)
- Still Waters: Oregon Book Award, Literary Arts, Portland, OR (nominated)
- Found : Oregon Book Award, Literary Arts, Inc., Portland, OR (nominated)

== Appearances ==
- The Oprah Winfrey Show, Blackbird, October 2000
- The Rosie O'Donnell Show, Blackbird, October 2000
- The Rosie O'Donnell Show, October 2000 for the release of Still Waters, October 2001
- BBC News, Blackbird, 2001
- Radio/TV: Frankfurt Book Fair, 2000/2001
- Radio/TV: Edinburgh, Scotland, 2001
- Radio/TV: Glasgow, Scotland, 2001
- Radio/TV: Denmark, 2001
- Radio/TV: Finland, 2001
- Radio/TV: Netherlands, 2001
- Radio/TV: Sweden, 2001
