= Idaho Cobalt Operations =

Mine in Lemhi County, Idaho, U.S.

- Location within Idaho
- Location: Lemhi County, Idaho, United States; 45°08′21″N 114°21′07″W
- Products: Cobalt, copper, gold
- Opened: 2022
- Company: Jervois Global
- Website: jervoisglobal.com/projects/idaho-cobalt-operations/
- Acquired: 2019

Idaho Cobalt Operations (ICO) is a cobalt mine located in Lemhi County, Idaho, United States, near the town of Salmon. The mine has reserves amounting to 3.8 million tonnes of ore grading 0.5% cobalt. The mine will also produce copper and gold. The project is located directly adjacent to the inactive Blackbird mine.

In 2019, the owner of the mine, the Canada-based Ecobalt Solutions, was acquired by the Australia-based Jervois Mining. The mine reopened in October 2022 as the only active cobalt mine in the United States. Construction on the mine ceased just five months later as cobalt prices stayed low, though it may reopen if they go up again.

== Background ==
Manufacture of electric cars drives increased demand for cobalt in the United States. This has prompted the federal government to prioritize extraction of domestic cobalt reserves (as well as lithium and other critical minerals). Most cobalt on the global market comes from the Democratic Republic of the Congo (DRC) and is controlled by China. Mining in the DRC is also notorious for human rights violations.

The Idaho cobalt mine is located in a cobalt belt that was mined intermittently beginning in the late 1800s. Full-scale cobalt mining began at Blackbird mine in 1949 and was closed in the late 1980s, leaving contaminated water and a Superfund site.
