= Alena Matejka =

Czech sculptor and glass designer (born 1966)

Alena Matejka (also Alena Matějková; born 26 January 1966) is a Czech sculptor and glass designer. She also works with other materials, often in combination.

== Education ==
Matejka was born in Jindřichův Hradec; she studied at the Secondary School of Glassmaking in Kamenický Šenov from 1981 until 1985. She was a student of Professor Vladimir Kopecky at the Academy of Arts, Architecture and Design in Prague (AAAD) between 1989 and 1997. In 1995 she studied for two months at the Glasgow School of Art, in the Ceramic Department. From 2000 to 2005 she studied for a PhD, again at the AAAD.

== Work ==
Matejka creates small and large sculptures from stone, marble, glass and ice. She creates small sculptures which float on water, but also builds huge installations such as the one in the underground Baroque casemates in Vyšehrad. Gorlice is a major installation in the underground hall in the old castle of Vyšehrad, consisting of a central colonnade of stone, with multiple stops, each with a different sculpture symbolising the choices one faces in life.

While in Scotland in 1995, she developed an interest in studying ancient tombs and their ornamentation, and also visited old settlements. Later, she made a series of kettles from glass. This has fragments from her journey in Scotland, inspired by the landscape, the people, and the old Scottish culture. The kettles were given chassis, wheels and fictional royal names.

In 2007, she created a bath tub made out of a single block of red granite from Sweden, entitled I sink, therefore I am, a pun on René Descartes' statement, I think, therefore I am. On the outside of the tub is a longer quote by Descartes.

She received first prize in international competitions in both Murano, Italy (1996) and Ebeltoft, Denmark (1997) for her sculptures in stone and glass.

== Projects ==
She has been involved in several projects, often in collaboration with her husband Lars Widenfalk, a sculptor who works mainly with stone; usually marble and granite, but also with other materials such as glass.

Artlantis is one of these projects, themed around the myth of Atlantis, and consisting of eight glass water containers. In four of these containers Matejka placed four granite houses, of varying sizes and architectural styles. Over the houses, hanging in the water, are small sculptures shaped like flowers, boats, doll heads and three hundred glass beads. These are all made of a special glass that reflects light in a distinctive way. Matejka's contribution was more the dreamy, fantasies and thoughts. Lars Widenfalk chose a more concrete or archaeological approach, with its granite sculptures of humans with live fish in the water containers.

Bed of Roses is made of ice and roses under the stay in Luleå Winter Biennial. A large "bed" (ice block) in transparent ice is placed inside a housing. Several red roses are frozen inside the bed. The ice is the symbol of eternity, while roses symbolise life and love.

Another project was Magic Carpet, consisting of large flying carpets made of glass. The two heaviest glass carpets weigh 300 kg each.

== Publications ==
- Matějková, Alena, Hájek, Jiří, Hájek, Milan: Preparation of Glass for Sculpture Casting using Microwave Energy, 14th Conference on Electric and Other Highly Efficient Methods of Glass Melting, České Budějovice, September 2007

== Catalogue and exhibition ==
- Talente´96/ Ein internationaler Wettberwerb für Nachwuchskräfte im Handwerk, Catalogue, München, 1996
- School of Professor Vladimír Kopecký, Suda, Kristian a kolektiv autorů.: Catalog for exhibition Four Glass Schools, Schalkwijk, Netherlands, 1996
- Czech & British Contemporary Glass Sculpture, The Studio Glass Gallery, London, UK, 1998
- Serenade of the Seas, The Art Collection, Norway, 1999
- Big kiln is a sure-fire success, Sunderland Echo, 7 February 2004, 2
- Global Art Glass Triennial, Borgholm Slottet, Sweden, (ISBN 91-631-7192-9)
- Vessels, The International Exhibition of Glass, Koganezaki Crystal Park, Japan, 2000
- Både is och ros för Luleå, Viklund, Conny: Sweden, NSD, 4 March 2002, 18–19
- Glass Sculpture, Robinson, Michael: Catalog for exhibition Auction of Contemporary Czech and Slovak Glass Sculptures, 1996
- České sklo od renesance po současnost, Hlaveš, Milan: Catalogue and exhibition, Uměleckoprůmyslové museum, Praha, 2003 (ISBN 80-7101-049-9)
- Vyšehrad Lughnasadh ´98, Catalogue and exhibition, Praha, 1998
- Boulevard des Sculptures 2004, Kijkduin, Holand, 2004, Catalogue and exhibition
- Czech Contemporary Glass, Expo 2005 Aichi Japan, 2004, Catalogue and exhibition
- Czech Mania – Young Czech Designers, organised by Czech Centre London, 2003, Catalogue and exhibition
- Mezinárodní sochařské sympozium Písek, Englichová, Věra: Catalogue, Písek, 2002
- Kopeckého škola 2003, Hlaveš, Milan: Catalogue and exhibition
- Kopeckého škola, Sogetsu Hall, Catalogue and exhibition, Tokio, Japonsko 1999
- Bridge for Peace, Markman, Goldman, Michal: Toronto, Ontario, Canada, 2007, Catalogue and exhibition
- Mezinárodní sympozium rytého skla, Catalogue and exhibition, Kamenický Šenov 1999
- Seeberg Lughnasadh 2002, Catalogue and exhibition, 2002
- Skulptur 2003, Aker Brygge, Norway, 2003, Catalogue and exhibition
- Skulptur 2005, Aker Brygge, Norway, 2005, Catalogue and exhibition
- Verres & Papierss, L´art des verriers et des graveurs tchèques contemporains, Liége, Belgie 1997, Catalogue and exhibition
- Vetri. Nell mondo. Oggi. Edited by Rosa Barovier Mentasti, Instituto Veneto di Scienze, Lettere ed Arti, Venezia, Italy, Catalogue and exhibition
