= Lars Widenfalk =

Swedish artist

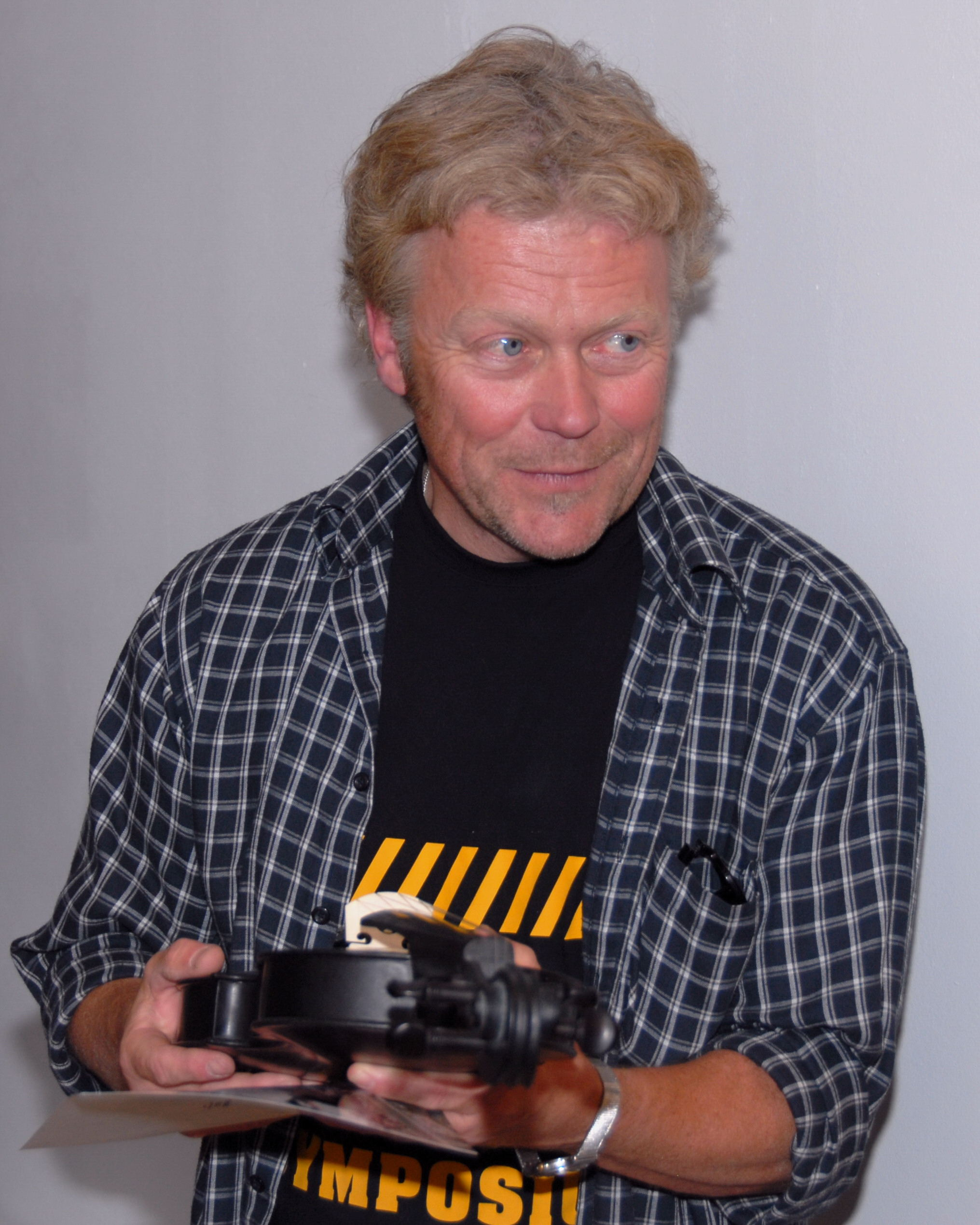
Lars Widenfalk (2007) and his stone violin Blackbird

Lars Widenfalk (born 31 July 1954) is a Swedish artist who works as a sculptor in Sweden, the Czech Republic and Italy. He is considered to have helped renewed figurative expression in Nordic sculpture. He works with many materials, from bronze, snow and ice. But his main material is stone, usually marble and granite. In recent years, he has also worked with glass. He is married to the Czech artist Alena Matejka. Widenfalk's sculptures evoke a sense of awe and wonder, inviting viewers to explore the harmonious relationship between humanity and the natural world. Through his sculptures, he invites us to pause, reflect, and appreciate the intricate wonders that surround us.

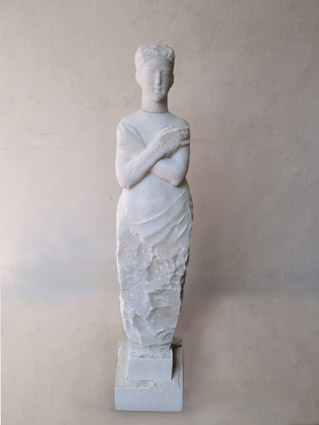
Cross my Heart, sculpture in white marble. Credit: Lars Widenfalk

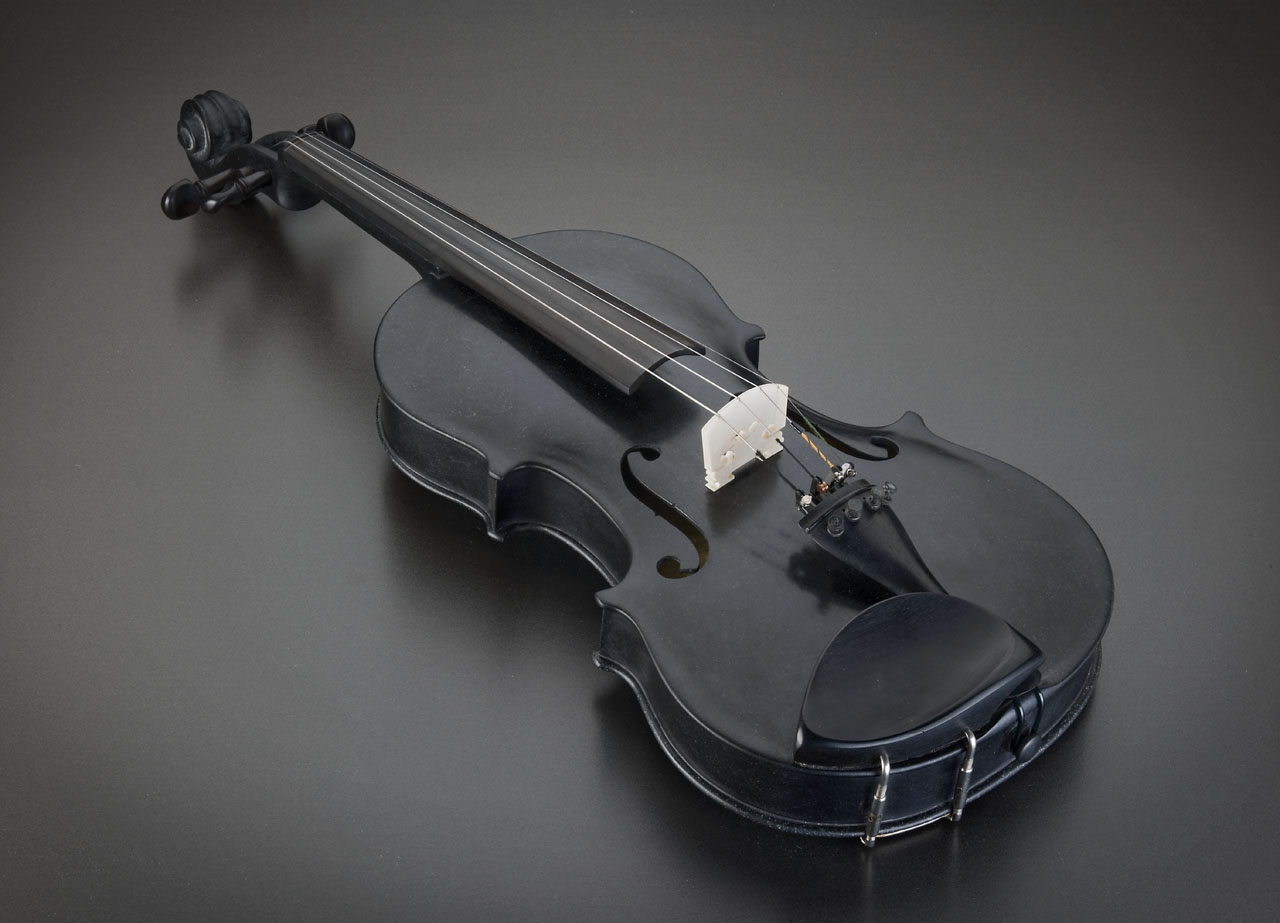
The violin Blackbird. Credit: Gabriel Urbanek

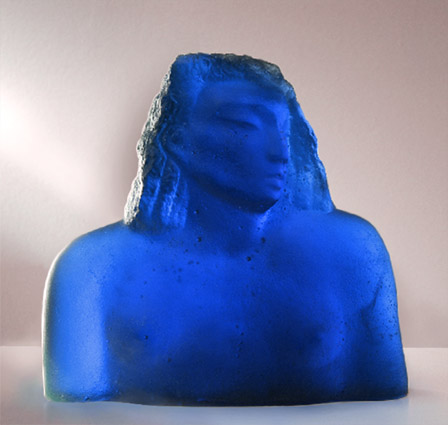
Blue Lady, sculpture in blue glass Credit: Lars Widenfalk

== Education ==
Widenfalk was born in Sveg, Härjedalen, Sweden.

He studied Archaeology and Art History at Uppsala University, Sweden. Later, he studied at the Norwegian National Academy of Fine Arts in Oslo (1982–85) focusing on the three dimensional work. He chose Oslo due to a desire to work with figurative sculptures.

== Work ==
Lars Widenfalk has been involved in several projects in the three-dimensional expression, often in collaboration with his wife Alena Matejka. She is educated in the Czech Bohemian glass tradition. It was she who introduced him to the crystal glass, a material he often uses in combination with stone.

One of Widenfalk's signature techniques involves working directly with materials such as glass, stone and wood. By utilizing these raw materials, he aims to preserve their inherent qualities, allowing their unique textures and characteristics to shine through in his sculptures. Widenfalk's process is meticulous, requiring a deep understanding of the medium and a patient exploration of its possibilities. Each piece is carefully crafted, paying homage to the material's history and transforming it into a work of art that tells a story.

His imagery is figurative. His early works were often realistic and figurative. But this has changed to sculptures with symbolic and soulish expression. Many of his works center around the theme of place and people. For example, his work on the room or the house, is usually open with simple geometric shapes. Marked only by four corner columns and a roof. Usually a full-length human or a human head is located in the house. He has also built several large aquariums, where he puts his sculptures along with living fish. In water the stone's color becomes much more intense.

One of his major works are the black violin, Blackbird, made from stone after drawings by Antonio Stradivari (Stradivarius), but with some technical adjustments in order to be playable. The violin is made of diabase (dolerite), a rock that was left over from his grandfather's tombstone. At its thinnest the stone is just 2.5 mm thick. The thin walls of the resonance box was contour cut with water and then machined with hand tools. It took two years to make the violin.

An installation Cross My Heart, St. Agostino, Pietrasanta, Italy, in 2011, consisted of twelve rather like sculptures of maidens with their arms crossed over the chest, made of white marble. A similar sculpture of a woman with arms crossed, is Listen to Your Heart, a granite sculpture with a height of 260 cm.

Whether it's a sculpture depicting a figure emerging from a tree trunk or a composition capturing the grace and power of an animal, Widenfalk's artistry invites viewers to contemplate the intricatem relationship between mankind and the environment.

Widenfalk's sculptures have been exhibited in prestigious galleries and art shows worldwide. He has had numerous exhibitions, most in Sweden, but several abroad, mainly in Norway, Denmark, Czech Republic and Italy. Widenfalk is represented in various collections, including the Swedish State Art Council, Göteborgs Art museum, Sundsvalls Museum and House of Parliament in Sweden. Also Norwegian Arts Council and Contemporary Modern Museum in Norway.

== Literature ==
- Caine, Alen. Masters and Emerging Sculptors from Studio Sem, Pietrasanta. Page 9-43.
- Forsberg, Carl. Less is more. Sculpture Review. Vol LV. No.3 2006. Page 32–37. (USA)
- Kalsi, Jyoti. As a work of art it is unique. Gulf News. (tabloid) 1. February 2005. Page 5. (Dubai)
- Pettersson, Jan Åke. Katalogtext för utställing på Brandts Klaedefabrik, Town Art Hall. Odense, Danmark 1989.
- Tovik, Arne. Reiste seg etter hærverket. Varden. Kultur. 5. juni 2005. Skien/Oslo. 2005. Page 42. (Norway)
- Stephens, C.S. Kawaguchi Public Art. 2003. Page 41. (Japan)
- Yman, Bosse. Lars Widenfalk skulptör utan gränser. Magasinet Herjedalen. Vinter/vår 2012. Page 62–69. pdf
