= The Blackbird (short story) =

1928 short story by Robert Musil

- Short story by Robert Musil
- Original title: Die Amsel
- Country: Germany
- Language: German

Publication
- Published in: Neue Rundschau
- Publication type: literary magazine
- Publication date: 7 January 1928

"The Blackbird" (German: Die Amsel) is a 1928 short story by the Austrian writer Robert Musil. It consists of three anecdotes about experiencing a strange state of consciousness. The story was first published in the Neue Rundschau and was included in Musil's 1936 collection Posthumous Papers of a Living Author. Like other short prose by Musil, "The Blackbird" was initially treated as a minor work, but it has attracted interest from scholars since the 1960s.

== Plot ==
Atwo meets his childhood friend Aone after many years apart and tells him three anecdotes from his life.

One night in his Berlin home, Atwo was in a state between sleep and consciousness and momentarily thought a blackbird he heard singing was a nightingale. When he woke up properly and looked at his sleeping wife beside him, she seemed like a stranger and he decided to leave his current life behind.

When Atwo was mobilised during World War I, there was an episode where he and a group of soldiers were unprotected and he got the sensation that they were about to get struck by a flechette. He entered a mental state that felt unreal. He neither said anything nor moved. After a moment, a flechette hit the ground close to him.

Atwo was estranged from his mother but occasionally exchanged letters with her. At one point, she wrote that she would be willing to die if it helped him get by. Soon after, she rapidly got sick and died, with no sign of self-inflicted harm. Atwo ponders on if it is possible for a body to commit suicide without conscious input from the mind. When he stayed at his mother's house to clear it after her death, he slept in his old room and went through the books he read as a child. A blackbird showed up at a window and briefly spoke, telling him it was his mother and asked if he remembered how they had met many years earlier. Atwo then remembered he had kept a blackbird in a wooden cage for a period in his childhood. He found the old cage in the house and kept the blackbird there, feeding it worms. It did not speak again.

Atwo thinks the experiences are related somehow, because they put him in the same state of consciousness.

== Publication ==
"The Blackbird" was first published in the Neue Rundschau on 7 January 1928. It was included in Musil's collection Posthumous Papers of a Living Author, published in 1936.

== Reception ==
Musil's short works have typically been seen as minor compared to his novel The Man Without Qualities, including by Musil, who referred to Posthumous Papers of a Living Author as "my little stopgap book". Alongside "The Fly Paper", "The Blackbird" is the short work that has received the most attention from scholars.

Benno von Wiese created interest in "The Blackbird" when he devoted a chapter to it in his 1962 book Die deutsche Novelle von Goethe bis Kafka. Wiese called it one of Musil's greatest works and analyzed its portrayal of mystical experiences as something that leads Atwo to religious faith. In the 1960s and 1970s, there was a series of texts by scholars who responded to Wiese's interpretation, continuing or trying to refute his argument about theological implications. Uwe Baur, writing in 1973, rejected the preceding conclusions by highlighting the narrator's criticism of Atwo and the character's infantilisation in his third story. Baur compared Atwo to Ulrich, the protagonist in The Man Without Qualities, and wrote that unlike Ulrich, Atwo is prevented by his solipsism from undergoing the personal transformation that defines a mystical experience.

Several academic studies of "The Blackbird" have followed. Walter Busch and Ingo Breuer edited the anthology Robert Musil. Die Amsel. Kritische Lektüren – letture critiche, published in 2000 with essays in German and Italian.

== Adaptation ==
The 2015 Hungarian film Feketerigó directed by Máté Szombath is loosely based on "The Blackbird". The film is set in the punk subculture of Budapest.
