= Mutual Blackbird =

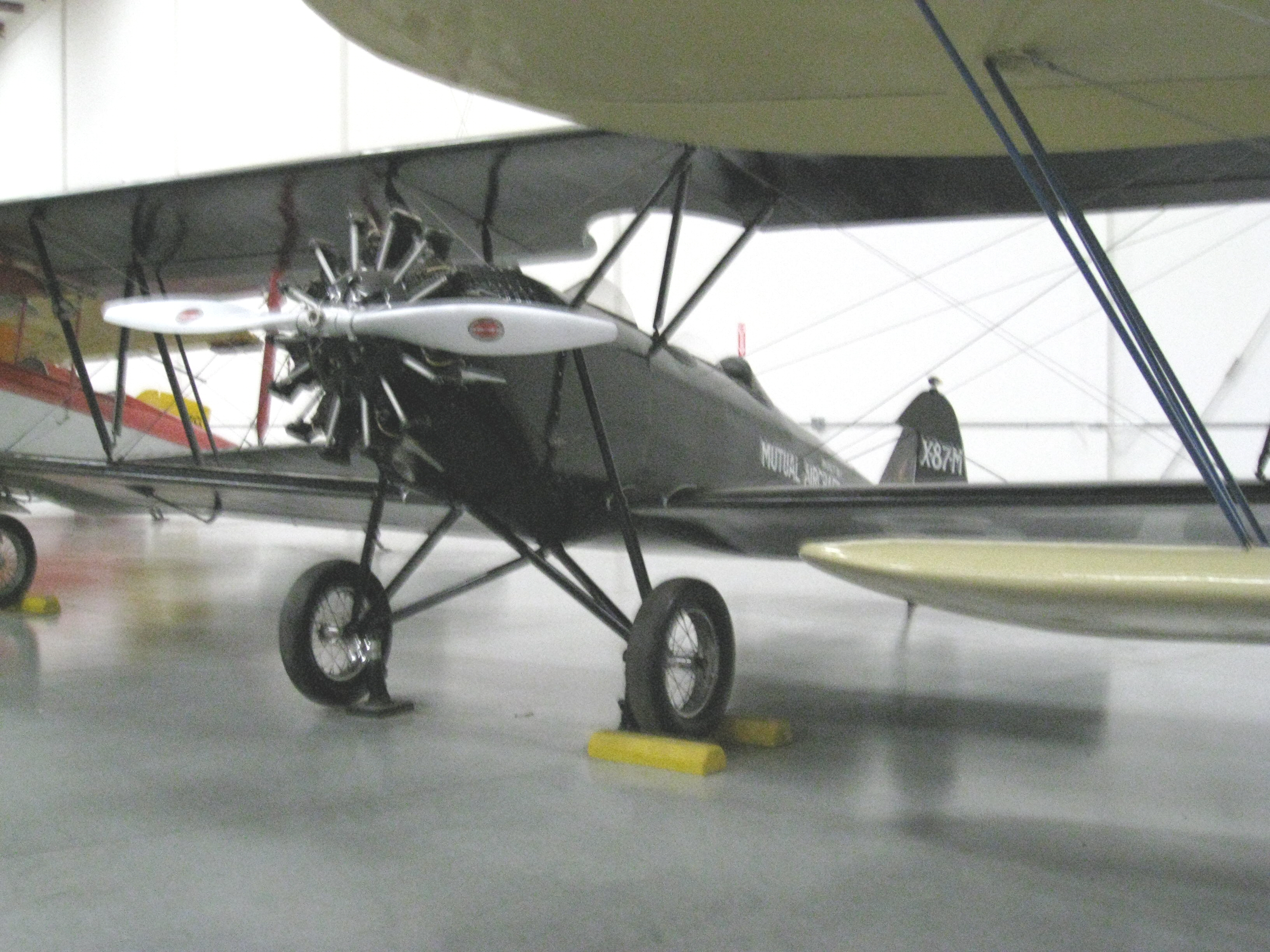
- The Mutual Blackbird preserved on display at the Yanks Air Museum, Chino, California in January 2008

General information
- Type: two-seat biplane
- National origin: United States
- Manufacturer: Mutual Aircraft Company
- Designer: Giuseppe Bellanca
- Status: preserved in museum
- Number built: 1

History
- First flight: 1929
- Retired: 1931

The Mutual Blackbird was a late 1920s two-seat open cockpit sporting biplane.

== Development ==
The aircraft was designed in 1929 by Giuseppe Bellanca for the Mutual Aircraft Company (also known as the Mutual Aircraft Service Inc). The Blackbird was built by Mutual at their factory in Kansas City, Missouri and first flew later that year. Although the sole aircraft X87M successfully completed some long-distance flights, no further production was undertaken.

== Operational history and preservation ==
The Blackbird flew successfully for 18 months before being damaged in a crash on landing near Kansas City on return from New York on 13 April 1931. The aircraft was stored in a barn until it was rediscovered in early 1995. It was restored by the San Diego Air & Space Museum at Gillespie Field, later displayed at the Yanks Air Museum, at Chino Airport in Chino, California and is currently (June 2018) displayed at the Gig Harbor Vintage Aero Museum, Gig Harbor, Washington.

== Specifications ==
Data from American aircraft : Mi-My

General characteristics

- Crew: 2
- Length: 21 ft 0 in (6.40 m)
- Wingspan: 30 ft 0 in (9.14 m)
- Powerplant: 1 × Hess Warrior 7-cylinder air-cooled radial piston engine, 125 hp (93 kW)
- Propellers: 2-bladed fixed-pitch propeller

Performance

- Maximum speed: 115 mph (185 km/h, 100 kn)
- Cruise speed: 95 mph (153 km/h, 83 kn)
- Stall speed: 35 mph (56 km/h, 30 kn)
