= Black Bird (video game) =

2018 video game

- Developer: Onion Games
- Publisher: Onion Games
- Designer: Yoshiro Kimura
- Artist: Kazuyuki Kurashima
- Composer: Hirofumi Taniguchi
- Platforms: Nintendo Switch, Microsoft Windows, macOS, PlayStation 4
- Release: October 18, 2018 (Switch, Windows); December 16, 2021 (PS4)
- Genre: Shoot 'em up
- Mode: Single-player

Black Bird is a side-scrolling shoot 'em up video game developed and published by Onion Games. The game was directed by Yoshiro Kimura and released for Nintendo Switch, Microsoft Windows and MacOS on October 18, 2018. A PlayStation 4 version followed on December 16, 2021.

The game, about a young girl who is reborn as a monster, utilizes a dark fairy tale aesthetic with moody pixel art, and a dynamic soundtrack that synchronizes with gameplay.

== Gameplay ==
Black Bird is a looping side-scrolling shooter where players control a young girl who, after being ignored by a crowd while dying, is resurrected as a monstrous and destructive crow-like creature. The player must navigate four distinct stages, destroying specified targets to trigger boss encounters.

The game utilizes a "combo" system where players increase their score and power by chain-killing enemies in quick succession. Defeated enemies drop gems that shrink over time; collecting them before they dissipate grants power to evolve the bird. There are also power-ups for health, more bombs or faster movement hidden in pots guarded by NPCs. "True Mode", unlocked after players complete the game, features an altered story, new secrets, and an increased level of difficulty. There are eight distinct endings based on the player's cumulative score.

== Development ==
The game was developed by Tokyo-based indie game studio Onion Games, led by former Rule of Rose and Little King's Story developer Yoshiro Kimura.

In April 2020, Onion Games partnered with Limited Run Games to release a physical "Collector's Edition" for the Nintendo Switch. This release included an artbook and an official soundtrack.

== Reception ==
Black Bird received "mixed or average" reviews, according to review aggregator Metacritic.

Critics noted the game's unique art direction and audio-visual synchronization. Chris Scullion of Nintendo Life described the game as a "unique little shooter that only gets better as you play it", though noted its short length as a downside considering its price. Ric Cowley of Pocket Gamer called it a "gorgeous, utterly bizarre mixture of grim worlds and weird characters", suggesting everyone should play it, though he criticized some aspects of its difficulty as unfair.

The game won several awards at the 2018 BitSummit indie game festival, including the "Vermilion Gate Award" (Grand Prix) and the "Excellence in Audio Award." It also received the "Best of Art" award at the 2016 Indie Stream Awards during development.
