= The Blackbirds (German band) =

- Origin: Püttlingen, Saarland, Germany
- Genres: Psychedelic rock, progressive rock, beat, psychedelic pop, krautrock
- Years active: 1968–1983; 1991–1995; 2015
- Labels: Saga, Long Hair
- Past members: Werner Breinig; Klaus Althmeyer; Siggi Burda; Helmut Vignerom; Helmuth Altmeyer; Heinz Koop; Hubert Koop; Peter Bely; Wolfgang Bode; Charles Sikora; Thilo Huble; Reiner Egelhof; Günter Lackes; Dieter Staub

The Blackbirds were a German Krautrock band active 1968-1983. The band had a similar sound to New Trolls. The band came together for a 50 year reunion in 2015.

== Discography ==
- No Destination, album 1970
- Touch of Music, album 1971
