= Blackbird (violin) =

Full-size playable violin made of black diabase

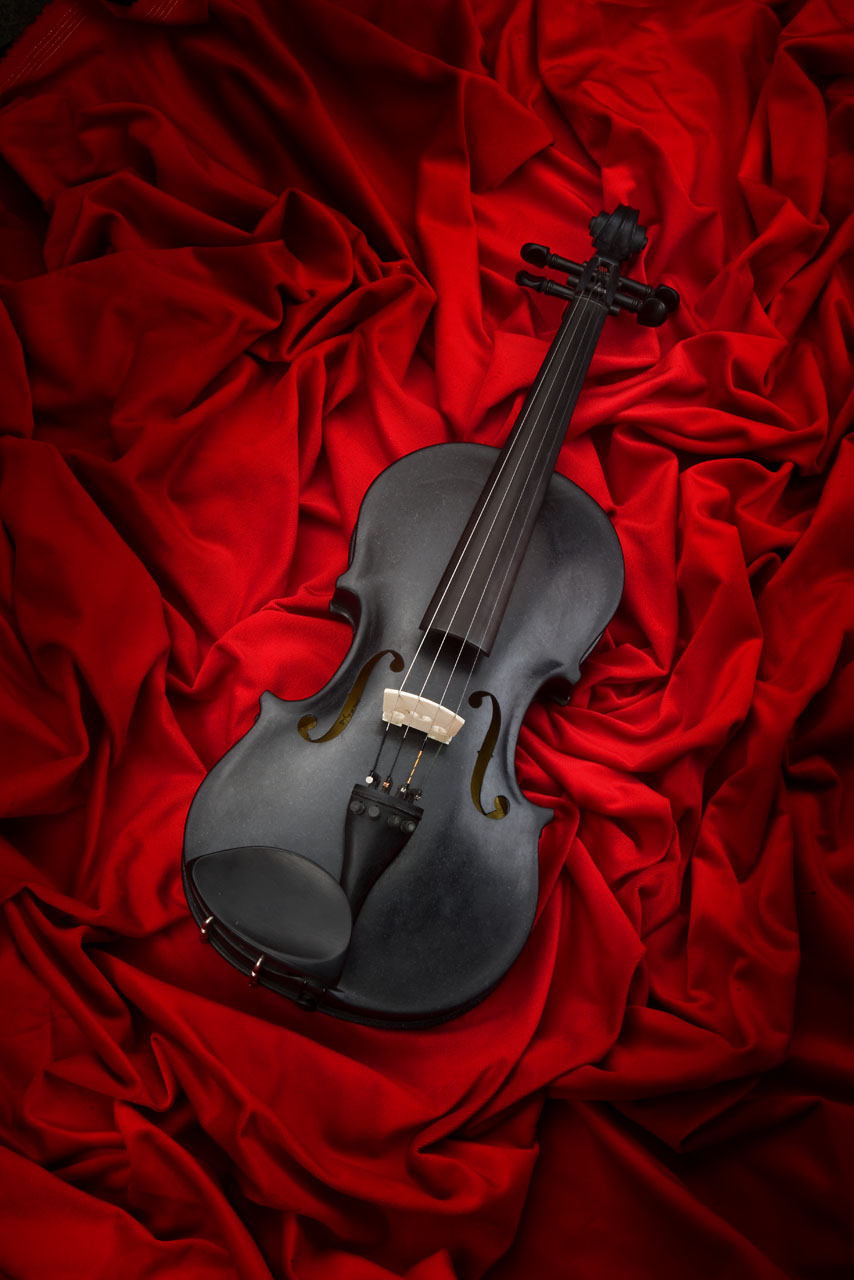
The violin Blackbird

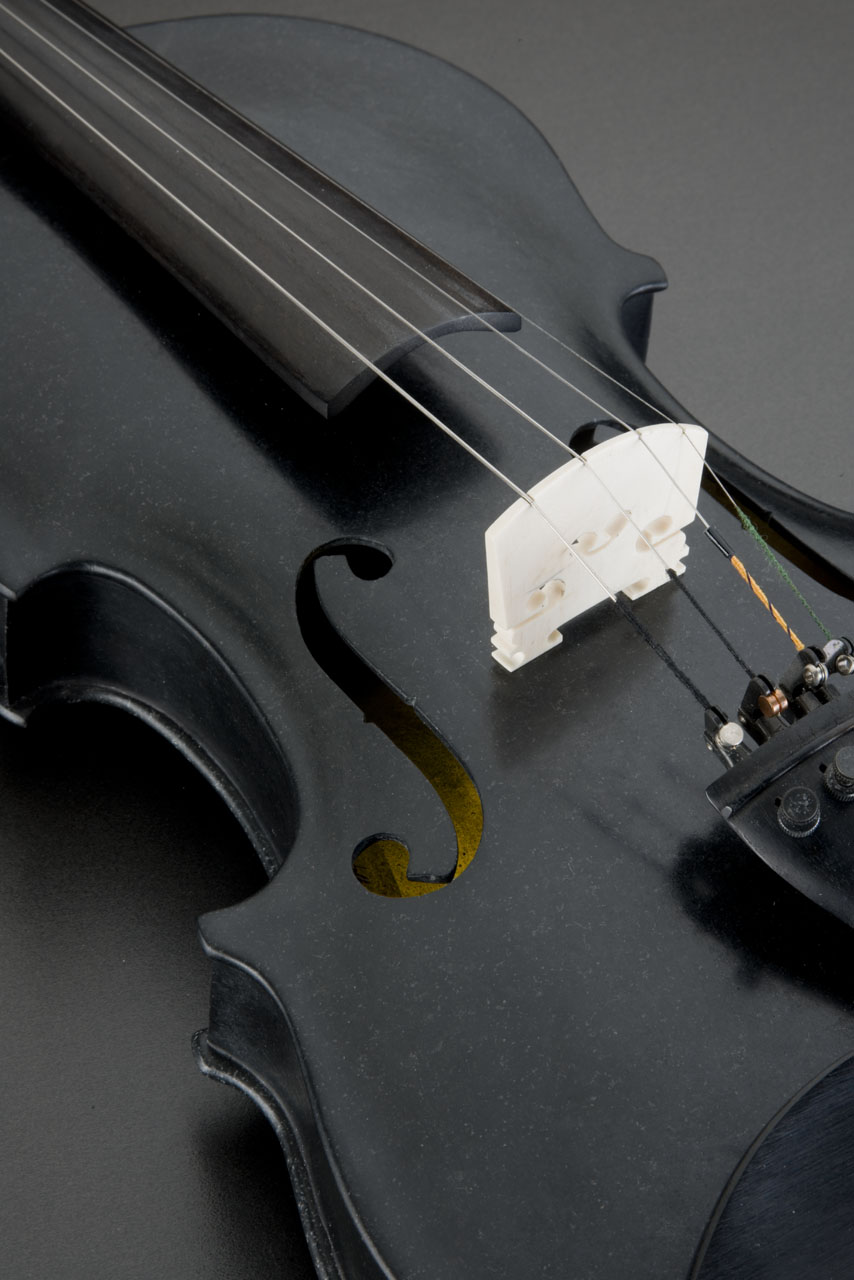
The bridge is of yellow mammoth ivory, symbolising the blackbird's yellow beak

The Blackbird, also called the Black Stone Violin, is a full-size playable violin made of black diabase after drawings by Antonio Stradivari (Stradivarius), but with technical modifications to allow it to be played. The violin was conceived and designed by the Swedish artist Lars Widenfalk. It was named 'Blackbird' after the common blackbird (Turdus merula) because of its coloring.

== Inspiration ==
The idea of constructing a musical instrument from stone came when Lars Widenfalk was working on big diabase blocks destined to form part of the artistic embellishment of the Norwegian TV building in Oslo, Norway. Each rock has a unique composition so they vibrate in different manners, producing a sound characteristic to that type of rock.

In 1990 Widenfalk acquired a small diabase block of high quality and blackness. It probably came from the quarries of northern Skåne in southern Sweden. It became clear to him that the size was right for an instrument such as a violin. The rock came from his grandfather's tombstone, which had been discarded after a joint family grave had been established. What made Widenfalk start to work on a violin was the desire to discover how far stone, in this case diabase, could be pushed as an artistic material, and he turned it into the world's first playable stone violin.

== Construction ==
Diabase is a black igneous rock with a dense and finely crystalline structure. The rock used for the belly and neck of the violin is about 1.6 billion years old. However, the source tombstone was not large enough for the whole violin. Therefore, the back plate was made of another stone, a porphyritic diabase, about 1.9 billion years old, from the province of Härjedalen in south central Sweden. The stone violin is constructed to the designs of Stradivarius, but it uses Widenfalk's own technical modifications to allow it to be played. It weighs 2 kilograms (4.4 lb) and took two years to construct, being completed in 1992.

The sound box of the violin is 2.5 mm (0.098 in) thick. It was made with highest precision and constructed with sound-holes, back and graceful scroll. The ribs (sound box wall) were made in one piece by first sawing out a 30 mm (1.2 in) thick plate shaped to form the external violin contour. Then the inside was removed using a waterjet and machined with hand tools to create a thin rib, no more than a couple of millimetres thick at its thinnest point. The interior of the box was gilded with gold. The fingerboard is made of ebony. Precision bonding of the sound box parts was done using two component glue and the neck secured with two silvered steel pins where it joins the body. The bridge is formed from a piece of mammoth ivory from Siberia, the yellowest available, symbolising the blackbird's yellow beak.

The Blackbird is not the only stone violin; the Czech sculptor Jan Řeřicha has made some stone violins. They are made from marble, a much softer stone and easier to process than diabase, and weigh between 3.6 and 6.5 kilograms (7.9 and 14.3 lb).

== Performance ==
The Swedish composer Sven-David Sandström composed music specifically for the instrument. The music's first public performance on the Blackbird took place in the Swedish Pavilion at the 1992 Seville Expo in Spain. In the same year the violin was blessed by Pope John Paul II in Rome. Since then, it has been played in many places including Dubai, Luxembourg, Monza, Milan, Nuremberg, Oslo, Prague, Stockholm and Washington. A video from Face II Face, the Lars Holm and Lars Widenfalk art exhibition in Linneanum, Botanical Garden, Uppsala 2009, includes a 30-second segment of a performance on the violin.
