= Blackbird mine =

Cobalt mine in Idaho, United States

- Location in Idaho
- Location: Lemhi County, Idaho; 45°7′2″N 114°20′33″W

Blackbird mine was a large cobalt mine in Lemhi County, Idaho, United States.

Mining for gold started in 1893, and the mine produced copper and cobalt between 1902 and 1968. The deposit still holds considerable amounts of copper and cobalt.

Water contamination at the mine resulted it its listing as a superfund site in 1983, and lawsuits ensued between the state of Idaho and the mining companies to clean it up. After over a decade in the courts, some cleanup began in 1997, which is indefinitely ongoing.

== Mine life ==
Intermittent mining began with gold discovered in the late 1800s. Cobalt was discovered in 1901, and full scale cobalt mining began in 1949. The mine was closed in the late 1980s leaving contaminated water and a superfund site.

Blackbird mine operated steadily from 1949 to 1959, supported by the federal government's demand for cobalt during the Cold War. The mine closed when federal demand ended; a few companies tried to open it again, but demand for cobalt was low and they were not successful. The mine was completely shut down by 1982.

=== Damages ===
By the early 1960s, contaminated water had resulted in the Snake River spring/summer Chinook salmon being eliminated from Panther Creek.

=== Cleanup ===
The state of Idaho sued some of the mining companies in 1983 for costs of cleaning up the mine. Lawsuits dragged until 1995, when some cleanup began.

== Water treatment methods ==
A water treatment plant collects contaminated water from the mine and uses a mechanical rake to dredge a sludge of coagulated heavy metals. The sludge is hauled in water tankers to be dried in open air basins elsewhere on the site. The sludge contains copper and cobalt, but it is uneconomical to salvage these minerals. Water treatment is ongoing, and reclamation managers did not foresee its end, stating "It’s really a very long way off,"

== Jervois mine ==
In October 2022, Jervois mining company began production in the Idaho cobalt belt at a site adjacent to Blackbird mine.

== Bibliography / external links ==
- Steele, Russell (2009). Cobalt: The Legacy of the Blackbird Mine. ISBN 978-0-9729108-0-4.
- Blackbird Mine Site Remedial Investigation, Lemhi County, Idaho. 2001.
- Bulletin - Idaho Bureau of Mines and Geology. 1983.
- Ream, Lanny R. (1993). Idaho Minerals. ISBN 9780928693027.
- Mok, W.M.; Wai, C.M. (1989). "Distribution and mobilization of arsenic species in the creeks around the Blackbird mining district, Idaho". Water Research. 23: 7–13. doi:10.1016/0043-1354(89)90054-7.
- Nold, J.L. (1990). "The Idaho cobalt belt, northwestern United States ? A metamorphosed Proterozoic exhalative ore district". Mineralium Deposita. 25 (3): 163. Bibcode:1990MinDe..25..163N. doi:10.1007/BF00190377. S2CID 129640922.
- Sorensen, Darwin L.; Kneib, Walter A.; Porcella, Donald B.; Richardson, Bland Z. (1980). "Determining the Lime Requirement for the Blackbird Mine Spoil1". Journal of Environmental Quality. 9: 162–166. doi:10.2134/jeq1980.00472425000900010034x.
- Nash, J.T.; Connor, J.J. (1993). "Iron and chlorine as guides to stratiform Cu-Co-Au deposits, Idaho Cobalt Belt, USA". Mineralium Deposita. 28 (2): 99. Bibcode:1993MinDe..28...99N. doi:10.1007/BF00196334. S2CID 129451149.
- Anderson, A. L. (1947). "Cobalt mineralization in the Blackbird District, Lemhi County, Idaho". Economic Geology. 42: 22–46. doi:10.2113/gsecongeo.42.1.22.
- Bending, J. Scott; Scales, W. G. (2001). "New production in the Idaho Cobalt Belt: a unique metallogenic province". Applied Earth Science. 110 (2): 81–87. doi:10.1179/aes.2001.110.2.81. S2CID 140634485.
- Roberts, W. A. (1953). "Metamorphic differentiates in the Blackbird mining district, Lemhi County, Idaho". Economic Geology. 48 (6): 447–456. doi:10.2113/gsecongeo.48.6.447.
