= The Blackbirds (South African band) =

The Blackbirds, also known as the Merry Blackbirds, were a South African band led by Peter Razent. Founded in Johannesburg in 1930 or 1931 and originally, the band included Griffiths Motsieloa and his pianist wife Emily.
