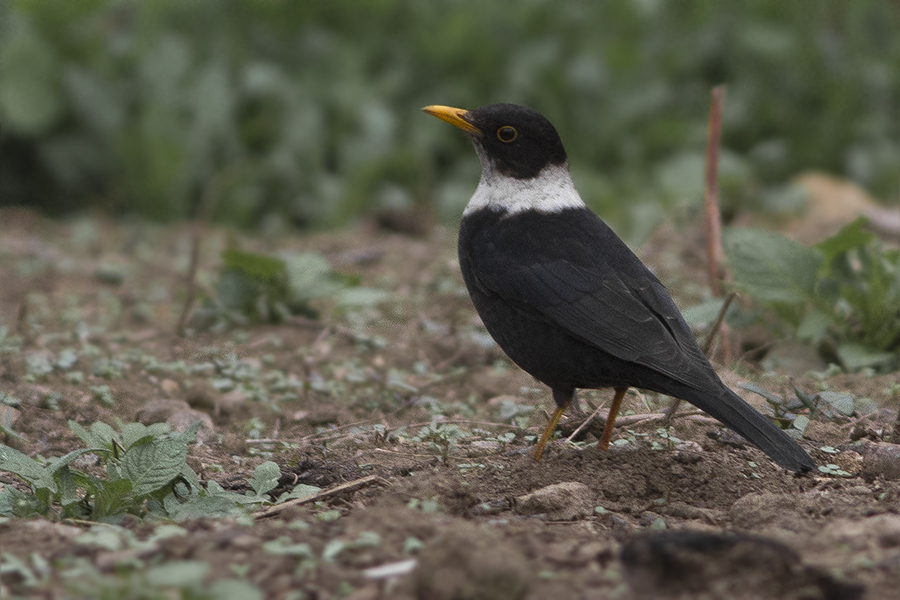
- Male in Khangchendzonga Biosphere Reserve, West Sikkim, India

Conservation status
- Least Concern (IUCN 3.1)

Scientific classification
- Kingdom: Animalia
- Phylum: Chordata
- Class: Aves
- Order: Passeriformes
- Family: Turdidae
- Genus: Turdus
- Species: T. albocinctus

Binomial name
- Turdus albocinctus Royle, 1840

= White-collared blackbird =

Species of bird

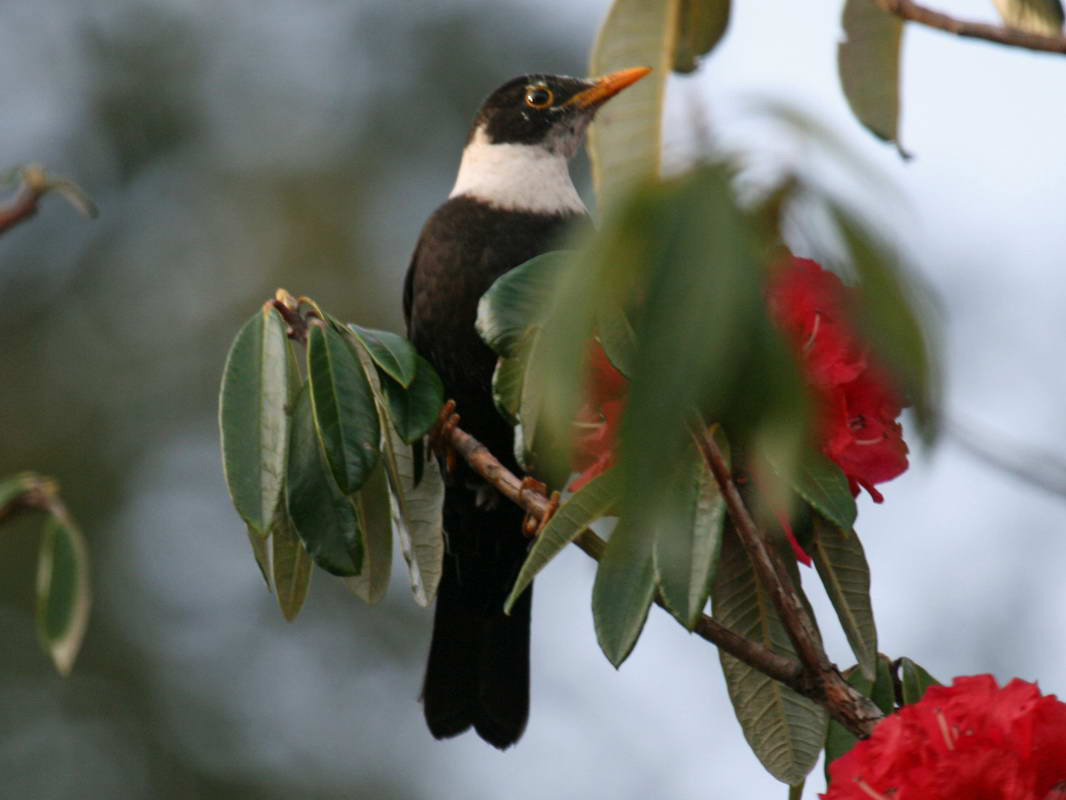
In Nepal

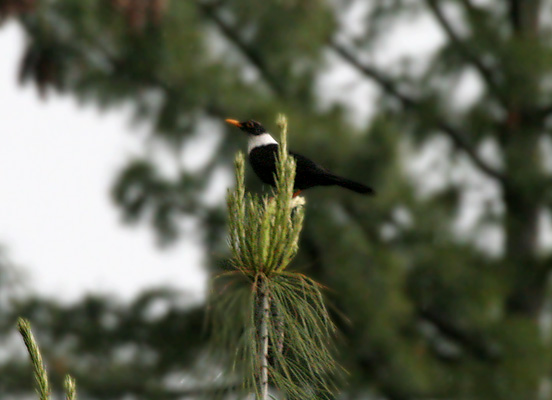
At Kullu - Manali District of Himachal Pradesh, India

The white-collared blackbird (Turdus albocinctus) is a species of bird in the family Turdidae.

It can be found throughout the Indian subcontinent, ranging across Bangladesh, Bhutan, India, Myanmar, Nepal and Pakistan. Its natural habitats are subtropical or tropical moist montane forests and subtropical or tropical high-altitude shrubland.

On the Tibetan Plateau White-collared Blackbirds can breed twice a year. The first breeding attempt results in small clutches where a few nestlings fledge in high body condition. Contrasting with the second attempt where larger clutches result in more chicks fledgling but these are in lower body condition. These differences are thought to be driven by parental feeding behaviour and seasonal variation in food availability. Field studies indicated that females, but not males, exhibit different nest defence behaviours that can be used to classify them into bold and shy personalities. Bold females had higher nest success compared to shy ones. White-collared Blackbirds feed their chicks plant material, especially berries, and invertebrates such as arthropods and annelids.
