= 8-Bit Rebellion! =

2010 video game

- 8-Bit Rebellion! promotional logo
- Developers: Artificial Life, Inc.
- Publishers: Artificial Life, Inc.
- Designer: Linkin Park
- Platforms: 8-Bit Rebellion!: iOS; 8-Bit Rebellion! HD: iOS (iPad only)
- Release: April 26, 2010
- Genre: Action-adventure MMORPG
- Mode: Multiplayer

8-Bit Rebellion! is a massively multiplayer online, and single player, video game released and based on the American rock band, Linkin Park for iOS.

== Gameplay ==
The game stages a plot in which players aim to defeat PixxelKorp, an "evil HD empire that has taken over the 8-bit world". Players take on missions that lead them through several levels called "dicts", each one based on one of the band's members. The game features Linkin Park promotional art as the basis of the game, including posters on the walls, paintings by Mike Shinoda himself, and all six band members drawn as 8-bit styled characters.

== Soundtrack ==
Each level includes 8-bit and original versions of Linkin Park songs. After beating the game and stopping PixxelKorp, the player unlocks a previously unreleased song, titled "Blackbirds" along with a video. It can be listened to in the game.

== Reception ==
Reception

Aggregate score
| Aggregator | Score |
|---|---|
| Metacritic | 63/100 |

Review scores
| Publication | Score |
|---|---|
| The A.V. Club | C− |
| GamePro | 2.5/5 |
| GamesMaster | 67% |
| Gamezebo | 2/5 |
| Macworld | 2.5/5 |
| Pocket Gamer | 2.5/5 |
| TouchArcade | 3.5/5 |

The game received "mixed or average" reviews according to the review aggregation website Metacritic.
