= The Dougy Center =

Nonprofit organization based in Portland, Oregon, US

Dougy Center
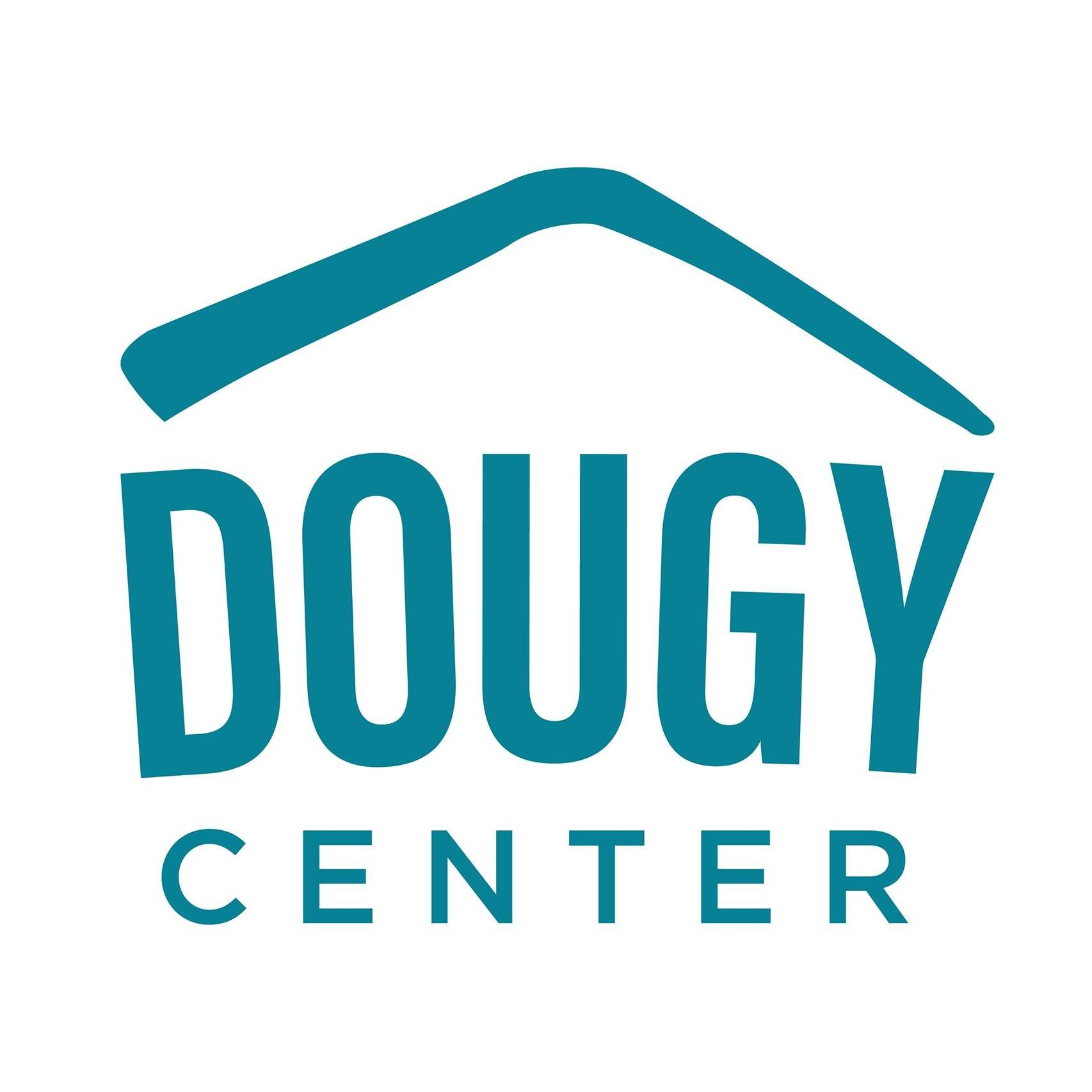
- Founded: 1982
- Founder: Beverly Chappell
- Purpose: Grief support
- Location(s): 3909 Southeast 52nd Avenue; Portland, Oregon; United States
- Coordinates: 45°29′40.5″N 122°36′33.8″W
- Region served: Portland metropolitan area
- Key people: Brennan Wood (Executive director); Donna Schuurman, Ed.D., FT
- Employees: 27 (2022)
- Volunteers: 140 (2004)
- Website: www.dougy.org

Dougy Center, The National Grief Center for Children & Families (formerly The Dougy Center, The National Center for Grieving Children & Families, or simply Dougy Center) is a nonprofit organization based in Portland, Oregon that offers support groups and services to grieving children and young adults. Its peer support program and network of children's grief services make the organization the first of its kind in the United States. 500 independent programs around the world are based on its model, more than 300 of which have staff who were trained by the organization's staff. Dougy Center serves 400 children and 250 adults from the Portland metropolitan area each month, free of charge. Its main building is located in the Creston-Kenilworth neighborhood, and its satellite locations in Canby and Hillsboro are called The Dougy Center Walker's House and The Dougy Center Linklater Commons, respectively.

The organization was founded in 1982 by Beverly Chappell, in tribute to Dougy Turno, who died of a brain tumor at age thirteen. In August 1981, Dougy wrote a letter to Elisabeth Kübler-Ross, a pioneer in near-death studies, on the subject of his own death. This prompted Kübler-Ross to connect Chappell with Dougy and his family, and Chappell to create support groups for grieving children. Since its establishment, more than 20,000 children and their family members have received support from the organization.

In 2009, an unidentified arsonist destroyed the center. Construction on a new building began in April 2012, but in the interim, the center operated in Northeast Portland. Following $4.5 million in construction costs, the current 11,750-square-foot facility opened in February 2013 in its original location.

== Mission and model ==
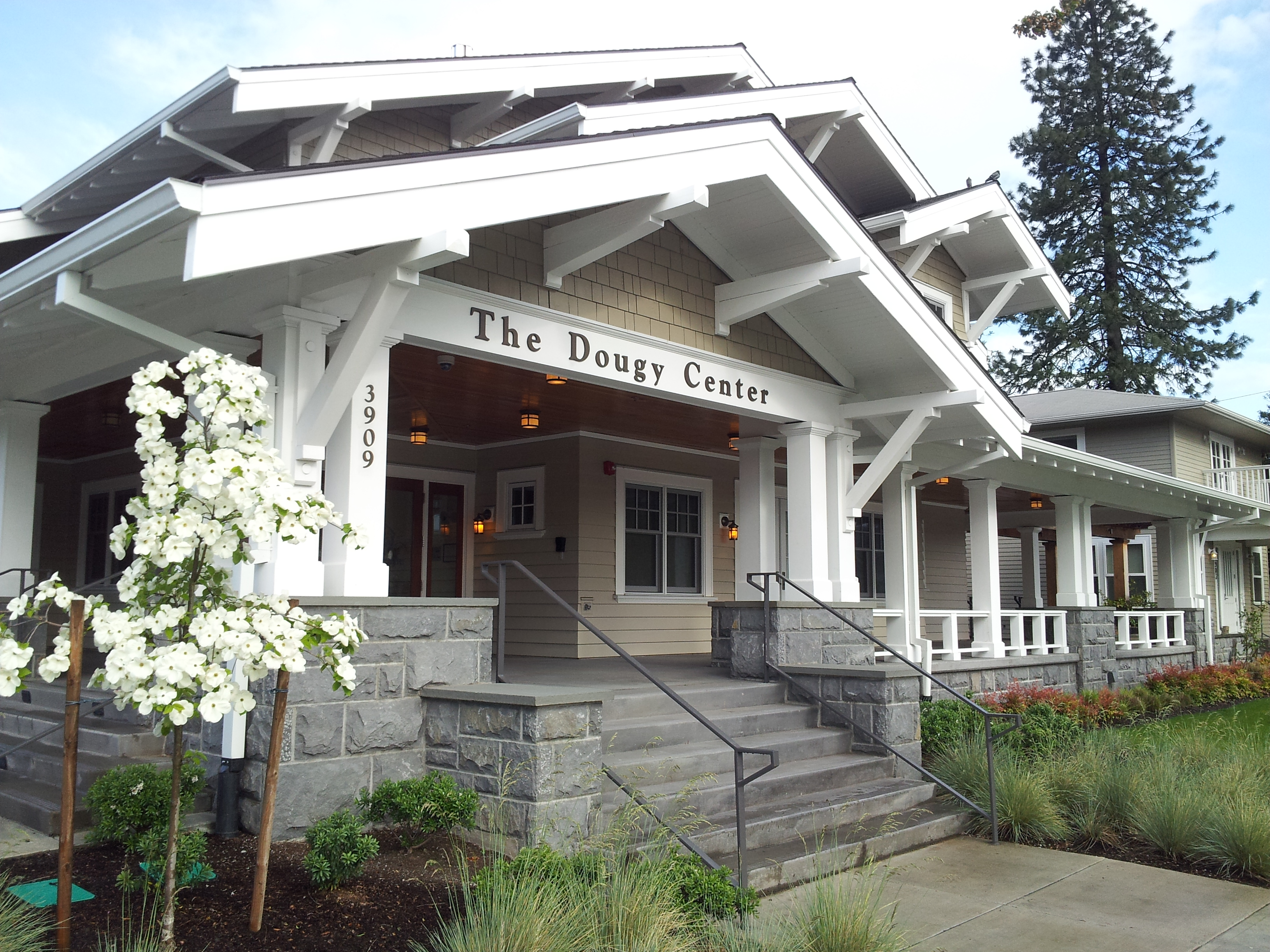
The building's exterior in 2014

Dougy Center, established in 1982 in Portland, Oregon offers support groups and services to grieving children. It has been described as a "safe haven where grief is normal", and is assisted by support groups, professional staff, and trained volunteer facilitators. Groups are separated by age (for example, the "Littles" group is for children ages 3–5) and type of death. Through a peer support model, children are encouraged to talk and play with one another, sharing their experiences in the process. Its peer support program and network of children's grief services make the organization the first of its kind in the United States. 500 independent programs around the world are based on its model, more than 300 of which have staff who were trained by the organization's staff. Its Summer Institute offers training for the leaders of other grief support programs.

The center serves 400 children and 250 adults each month, focusing its efforts on children and teens (ages 3–18) and young adults (ages 19–30). Since its establishment, more than 20,000 children and their family members in the Portland metropolitan area have benefited from The Dougy Center, free of charge. Support groups are offered in Canby, Hillsboro, and Portland. In 2004, 140 volunteer facilitators donated more than 10,500 hours of service to the center. The organization employs a staff of around fifteen individuals, and is supported by an advisory board and board of directors.

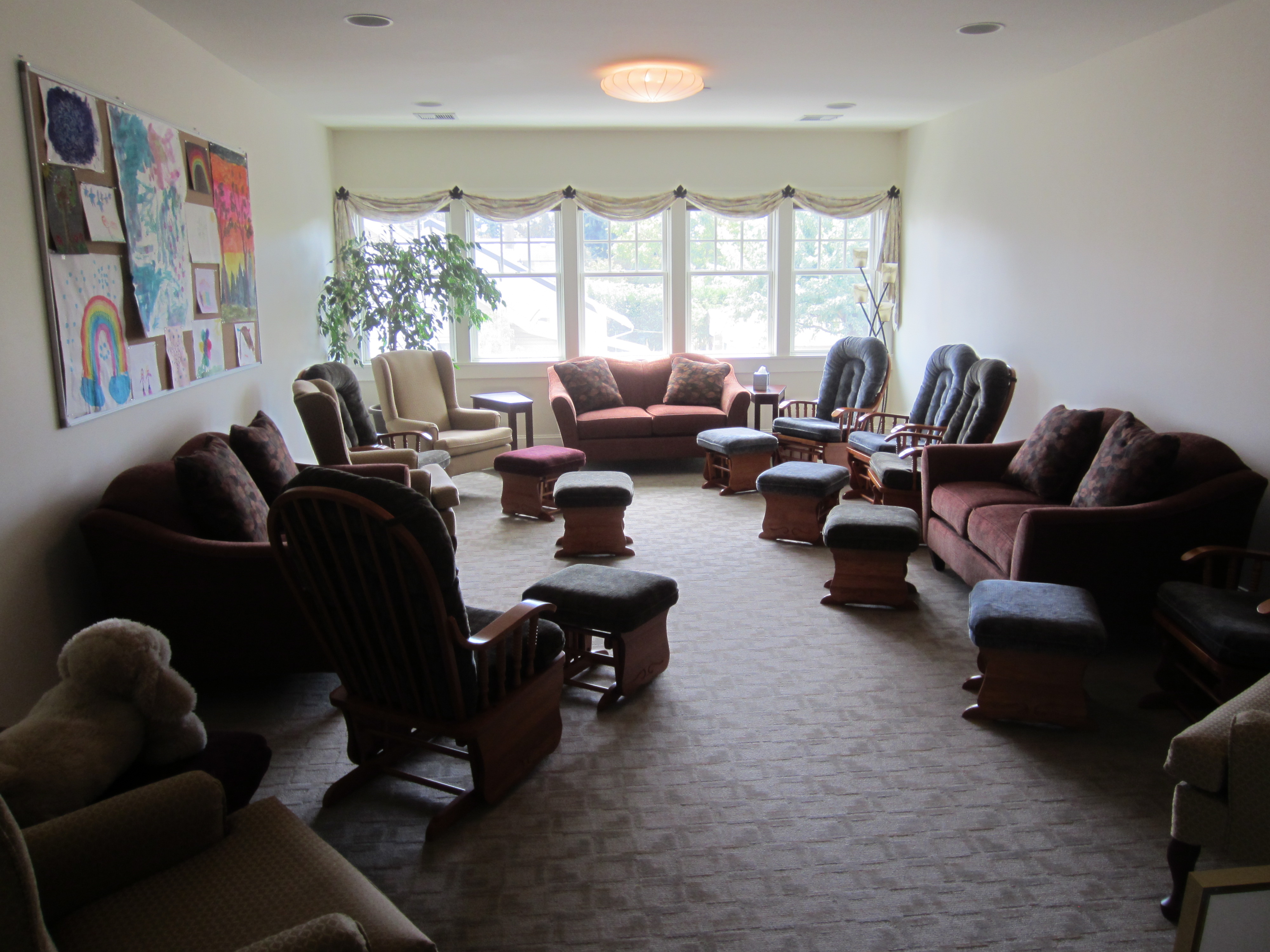
One of the center's meeting rooms

Dougy Center's main building contains round rooms designed with "creative" tunnels, some geared towards specific age groups; interactive features, such as slides and toys; and an art room. There exists a popular "Volcano Room", which contains gymnastics padding, a punching bag, and soft objects, allowing children to "express their feelings in whatever form they're comfortable with". The organization has satellite locations in Canby and Hillsboro, called The Dougy Center Walker's House and The Dougy Center Linklater Commons, respectively. As of 2011, the Hillsboro location serves 45 children and teens in three groups.

Dougy Center is a registered 501(c)(3) nonprofit organization that has various revenue streams. According to Partnership Northwest, the center receives little government financial support and depends on donations from businesses, foundations, and individuals. In 2012, the center received more than $10,000 from Regence Blue Cross Blue Shield and the Portland Rose Festival, via the Regence Grand Floral Walk. Other funding sources have included a concert headlined by a local singer-songwriter. Dougy Center hosts an annual Reflection Benefit, which includes a silent auction, dinner, and live auction. Porsche Boxsters have been raffled off at the benefit for fifteen years. In April 2010, Oregon Public Broadcasting sponsored a benefit event at Oaks Amusement Park called "Cookies with Cookie Monster", featuring a walkaround plush Cookie Monster. The event raised awareness for a program from the producers of Sesame Street called "When Families Grieve".

== History ==
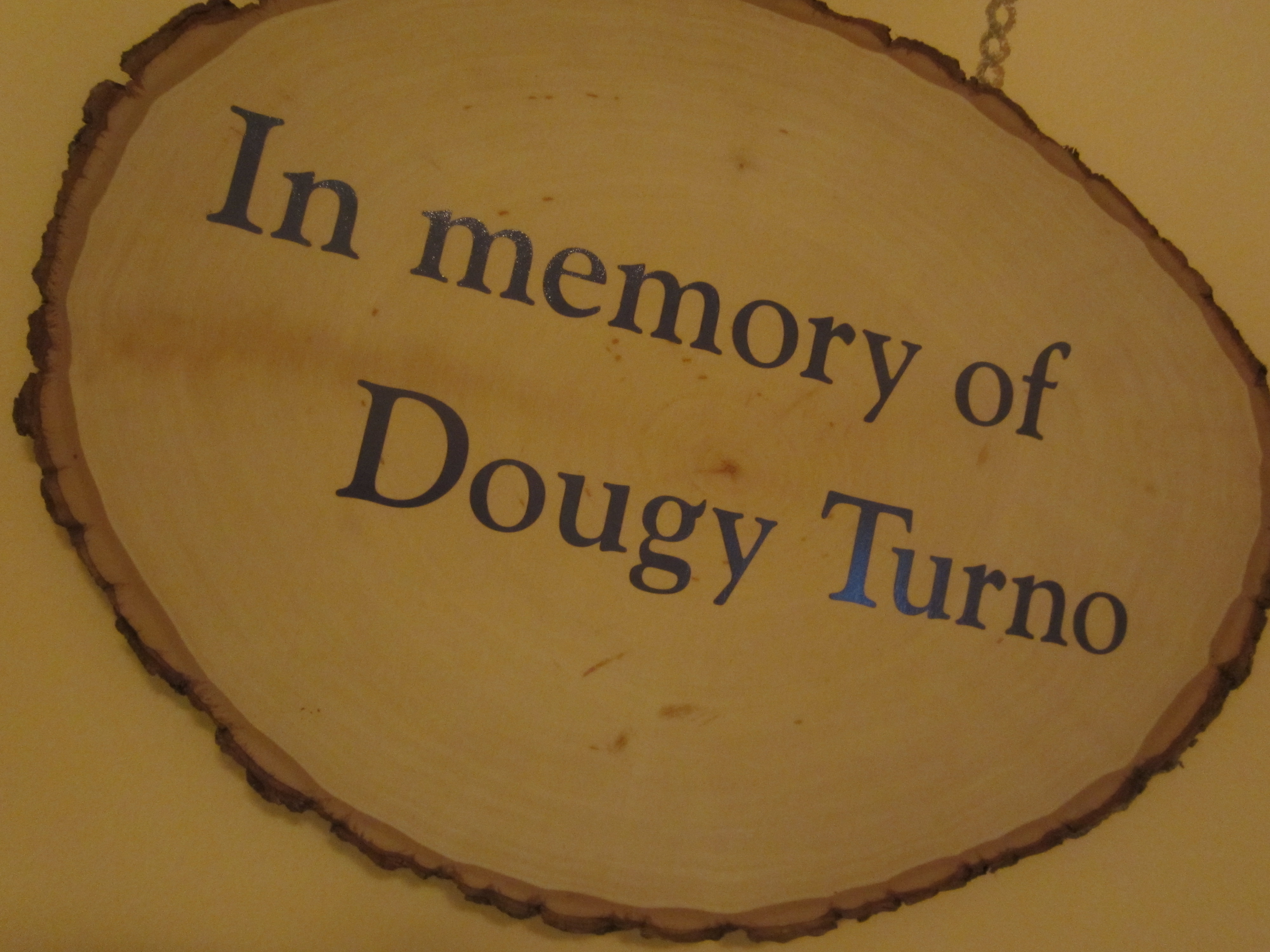
Signage commemorating Dougy Turno; Beverly Chappell founded Dougy Center in 1982 in his memory.

Beverly Chappell founded Dougy Center in 1982 in tribute to Dougy Turno, who died of a brain tumor at age thirteen. In August 1981, Dougy wrote a letter to psychiatrist and author Elisabeth Kübler-Ross, a pioneer in near-death studies, on the subject of his own death. This prompted Kübler-Ross to connect Chappell with Dougy and his family, and Chappell to create support groups for grieving children. Despite Kübler-Ross' early influence on the organization, Dougy Center does not subscribe to the Kübler-Ross model (a series of five emotional stages experienced by survivors of an intimate's death: denial, anger, bargaining, depression and acceptance) and has even expressed skepticism about the model.

In June 2009, an unidentified arsonist destroyed the center. According to Schuurman, the center suffered three arson attempts previously: a fire burned the professional building three months prior and was followed by the discovery of a soda can filled with flammable liquid, then the burning down of the center's play structure. Building and content losses were estimated at $750,000. Business and financial records, as well as program materials were lost in the fire. The organization spent a year attempting to recover a "fair" insurance settlement, during which the building remained vacant and was subjected to vandalism (stolen copper pipes resulted in a flooded basement). Deconstruction and demolition of the building began in May 2010, following receipt of a $1.2 million settlement. During the construction of the new center, which began in April 2012, the center operated on Northeast Glisan Street near 22nd Avenue in Northeast Portland and reportedly never cancelled a single support meeting.

On February 2, 2013, the center hosted a celebration to commemorate the completion and grand opening of its new facility. The 11,750-square-foot building, located at its original site on Southeast 52nd Avenue in Portland's Creston-Kenilworth neighborhood, cost $4.5 million and was designed by Scott Edwards Architecture and built by Bremik Construction. Donations and the insurance settlement supplied seventy percent of the construction costs.

Dougy Center was forced to pause in-person sessions upon the arrival of the COVID-19 pandemic, until October 2021. In 2022, the organization had 27 employees and an annual budget of approximately $2.2 million.

== Reception ==
In 2013, Schuurman was awarded the Clinical Practice Award by Association for Death Education and Counseling, one of the oldest organizations in the counseling psychology field of dying, death and bereavement. In 2014, the center's reconstructed building design earned Scott Edwards Architecture an Award of Merit (also known as the Building Industry Community Spirit award) at the Gold Nugget Awards, which recognize "design excellence of U.S. and international projects submitted by builders, developers, architects and land planners". The firm also received the Against All Odds Award at the 2014 Design Excellence Awards, presented by the Oregon chapter of the International Interior Design Association.

== Publications ==
- 35 Ways to Help a Grieving Child.
  35 Maneras de ayudar a un niño angustiado o apenado (in Spanish). Dougy Center. February 2007. ISBN 978-1-890534-08-0.
- Schuurman, Donna L. (1997). Helping Children Cope with Death. Dougy Center for Grieving Children. ISBN 1-890534-00-5.
  Cómo ayudar a un niño a sobrellevar una muerte (in Spanish). Dougy Center. February 2007. ISBN 978-1-890534-09-7.
- Hoff, Joan Schweizer; Schuurman, Donna L.; Spencer, Donald W.; White, Cynthia (1998). Helping the Grieving Student: A Guide for Teachers. Dougy Center. ISBN 1-890534-01-3.
- Helping Teens Cope with Death. Dougy Center for Grieving Children. 1999. ISBN 1-890534-02-1.
  Ayuda para adolescents sobrellevar una muerte de un querido (in Spanish). Dougy Center. June 2009. ISBN 978-1-890534-12-7.
- I wish I was in a lonely meadow (1999)
- We don't like remembering them as a field of grass (1991)
- What About the Kids? Understanding Their Needs in Funeral Planning & Services. Dougy Center. 1999. ISBN 1-890534-04-8.
- When Death Impacts Your School: A Guide for Administrators. Dougy Center. 2000. ISBN 1-890534-05-6.

== See also ==
- Sadness
