= Literary Arts, Inc. =

Organization based in Portland, Oregon, U.S.

- The organization's logo
- Established: 1985; 41 years ago
- Founded at: Portland, Oregon
- Merger of: Oregon Institute for Literary Arts; Portland Arts and Lectures
- Type: 501(c)(3) nonprofit organization
- Purpose: Engage readers, support writers, and inspire the next generation with great literature

Literary Arts, Inc., is a 501(c)(3) nonprofit literary organization based in Portland, Oregon, established in 1985. Its mission is to engage readers, support writers, and inspire the next generation with great literature. The mission's three branches are reflected in three programing areas: reader outreach, supporting "authors, poets, playwrights and cartoonists", and exposing youth to literature. Literary Arts sponsors the Oregon Book Awards, Oregon Literary Arts Fellowships, and The Portland Arts & Lectures Series. Literary Arts also joins with other community organizations in presenting programs, an active out-reach program and frequent collaborations with other cultural arts organizations in Portland.

== History ==
Literary Arts began in 1984 as Portland Arts and Lectures, an event series started by Karen Frank that was designed to bring leading authors and cultural thinkers to Portland. The Oregon Institute for Literary Arts (OILA) was founded in 1986 by Brian Booth to offer writer fellowships and the Oregon Book Awards, which were first presented in 1987. In 1993, Portland Arts and Lectures merged with OILA to become Literary Arts. OILA had been dedicated to supporting Oregon's writers and publishers through grants, awards, and public recognition. The mission of OILA lives on through the Oregon Book Awards and Literary Fellowships program, which honor and supports Oregon writers and publishers through fellowships and awards.

== Programs ==
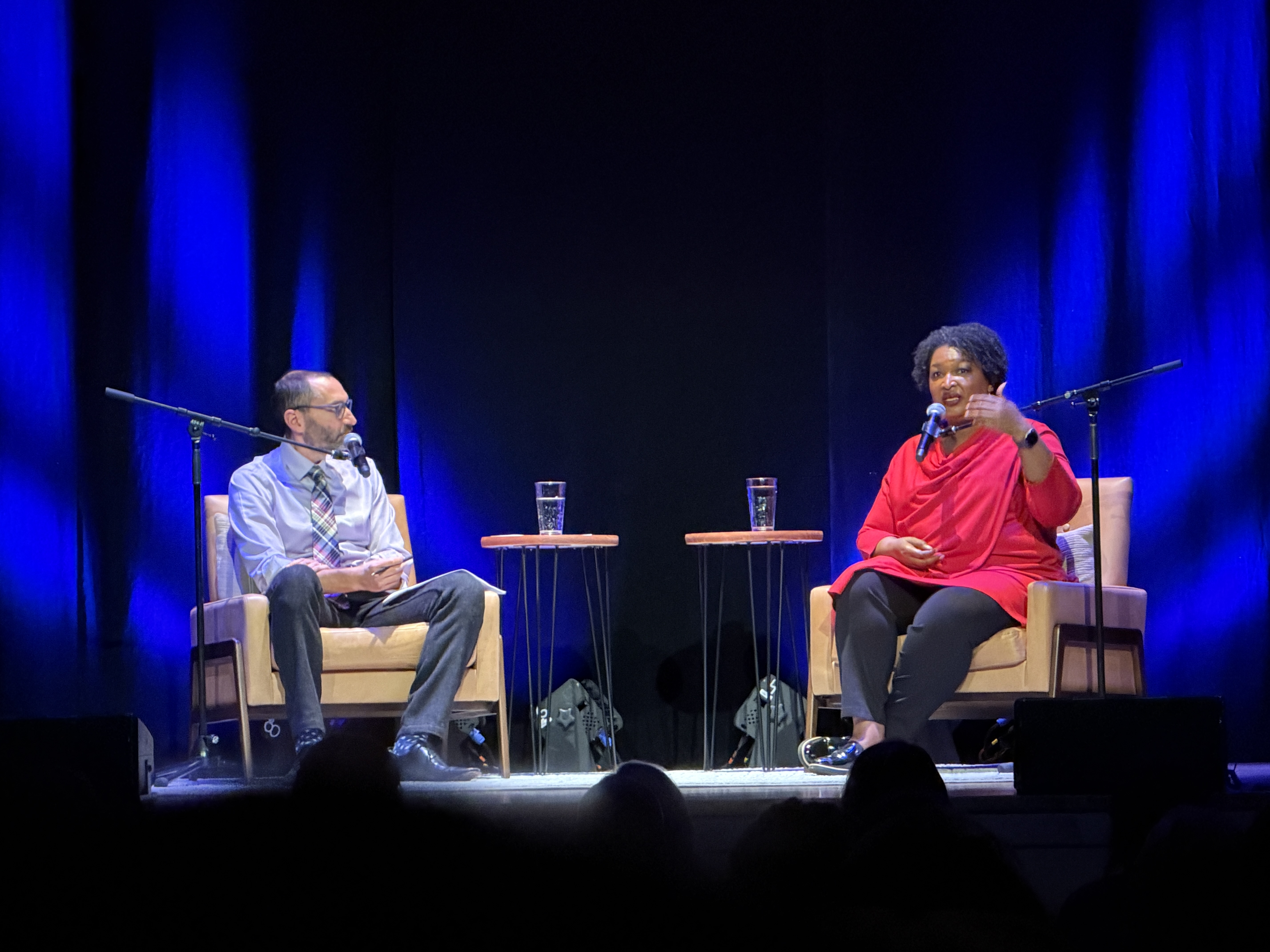
Dave Miller of OPB interviews Stacey Abrams at the Portland Book Festival, 2025

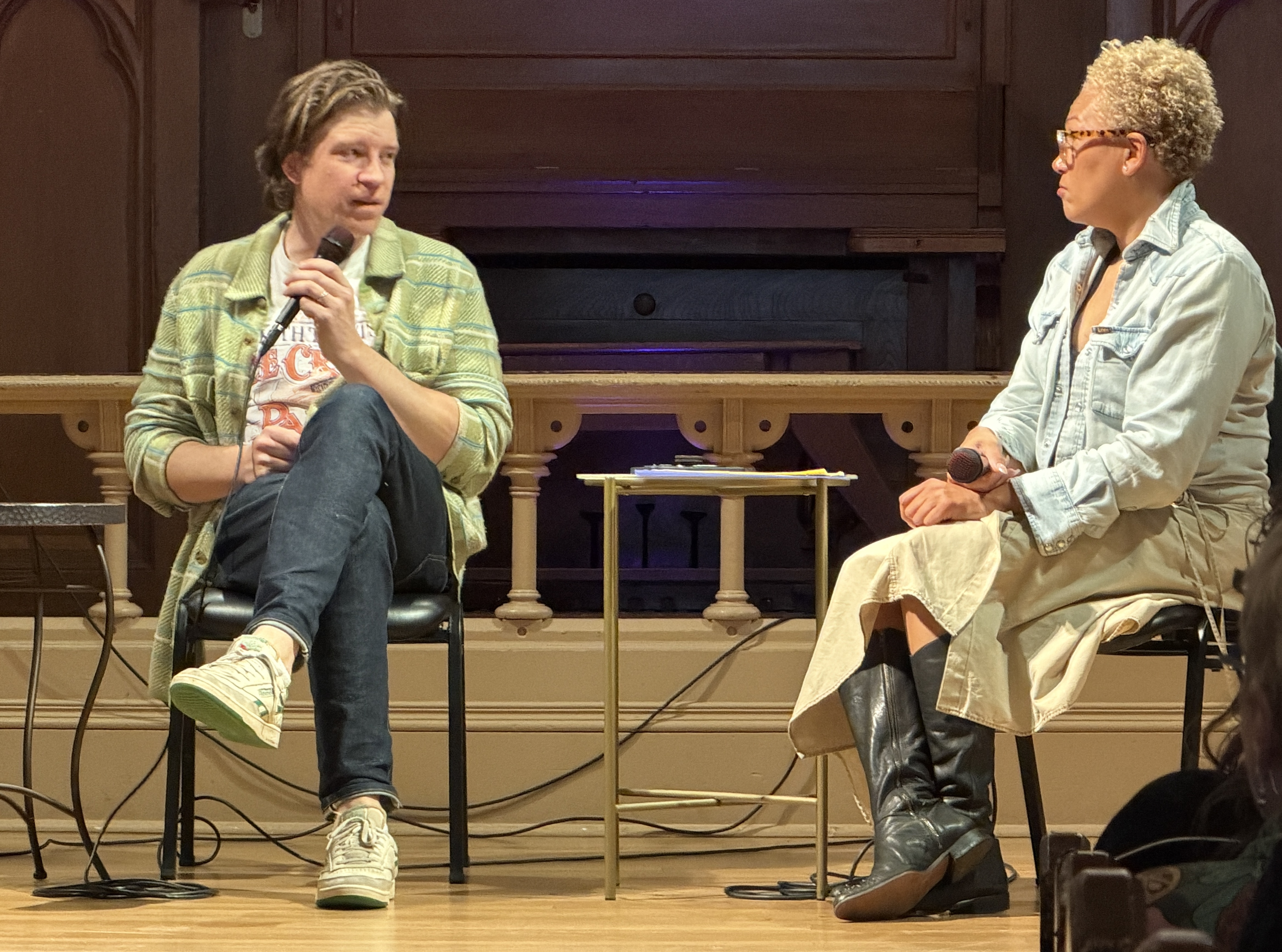
Tyler Malek of Salt & Straw talks to moderator Kimiko Matsuda at the Portland Book Festival, 2025

- Delve Readers Seminars — "provide peer-to-peer learning experience that fosters community and intellectual inquiry"
- Portland Book Festival (formerly "Wordstock") — an annual literary festival held in Portland, Oregon, United States, started in 2005. It is the largest festival of its kind in the Pacific Northwest.
- The Oregon Book Awards & Fellowships — Oregon Book Awards are presented annually by Literary Arts to honor the "state’s finest accomplishments by Oregon writers who work in genres of poetry, fiction, graphic literature, drama, literary nonfiction, and literature for young readers.
- Portland Arts & Lectures — Since 1993, Literary Arts has presented The Portland Arts And Letters series, bringing nationally and internationally recognized writers into the Pacific Northwest. It is the largest live audience literary series in the nation in terns of ticket sales and attendance.
- Oregon Literary Arts Fellowships — "are intended to help Oregon writers at all stages of their career initiate, develop, or complete literary projects in poetry, fiction, literary nonfiction, drama, and young readers' literature"
- Literary Career Fellowships — include a $10,000 stipend
- Writers in the Schools — Launched in 1996, Writers in the Schools (WITS) program brings working writers into high school classrooms to inspire students to immerse themselves in creative writing. WITS writers closely collaborate with classroom teachers to create semester-long curricula that meet the goals for arts learning, while also helping students understand the real-world importance of reading and writing in all aspects of life.
- The Archive Project — Literary Arts: The Archive Project is a podcast co-production of Literary Arts and OPB featuring recordings from the Portland Arts & Lectures series, Portland Book Festival, and other community literary events.
